= CBSé =

Argentine yerba mate company

CBSe
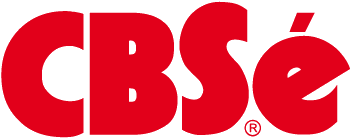
- Company type: Private
- Industry: Beverage
- Founded: 1978; 48 years ago
- Headquarters: Buenos Aires, Argentina
- Area served: Americas, Europe
- Products: Yerba mate
- Website: cbse.com.ar

CBSé is an Argentinian brand of yerba mate founded in San Francisco, Córdoba. The company is known for producing yerba mate compuesta, a blend of yerba mate and added herbs. It manufactures traditional and flavored yerba mate products and related items.

== History ==
CBSé was founded in 1978 by Florentino Orquera and María Amelia Elizagaray. The founders began producing blended yerba mate products in their home after identifying a potential market for them. The company's first product, Hierbas Serranas, has been described as the first yerba mate in Argentina to incorporate added herbs.

The brand name "CBSé" derives from the Spanish verb cebar, which refers to the act of preparing mate.

In 1982, the company moved production to a 15,000 m^{2} plant in Frontera, Santa Fe. Administrative offices were opened in Buenos Aires in 1993. During the 1990s, CBSé expanded its operations to include herb cultivation in Valle Fértil, San Juan, and established Establecimiento Santa Ana in Misiones in 1998. In 2010, additional drying facilities were opened in Capioví, San Pedro, Dos Arroyos and Andresito, Misiones.

In 2013, CBSé redesigned its product packaging. In 2015, the company submitted a proposal to the Unicode Consortium requesting the inclusion of a mate emoji. In 2016, it introduced "Mateando", which the company describes as the world's first food truck dedicated to mate products.

== Product development ==
In 1997, CBSé introduced flavored yerba mate products, including orange, lemon, grapefruit and coffee varieties. In 2011, the company launched the "Hierbas Cuyanas" line, which includes blends containing boldo (Peumus boldus), lemon balm (Melissa officinalis), fennel (Foeniculum vulgare), chamomile (Chamaemelum nobile), and mint (Mentha).

In 2017, CBSé released "Mi Primer Mate," a limited-edition product intended for children. During the same year, the company rebranded its "Energía" variety as "CBSé Guaraná." In 2018, CBSé launched "CBSé Etiqueta Negra," which the company described as a premium version of its "Hierbas Serranas" product, consisting of yerba mate and herbs aged for 18 months.

== Market position and distribution ==
CBSé is a major brand in the Argentine yerba mate market. According to a survey by Economic, Establecimiento Santa Ana (responsible for CBSé distribution) ranked third in the yerba mate sector, behind Taragüí (Establecimiento Las Marías) and Playadito (Cooperativa Liebig) respectively, having approximately 22 million kilograms of product distributed in supermarkets.

Following the expansion of flavored varieties in the late 1990s, the company obtained ISO 9001:2000 certification. CBSé exports to countries in the Americas and Europe, as well as to Australia and the United Arab Emirates. This certification enabled it to export its products to Uruguay, Paraguay, the USA, and Spain.

In 2021, the company reported exports of more than one million kilograms, representing approximately 2% of total sales.

== Operations ==
CBSé operates several facilities in Argentina. Its administrative headquarters are located in Buenos Aires. Its principal industrial facility, Establecimiento Santa Ana, is located in Santa Ana, Misiones. The company also operates drying facilities in Capioví, San Pedro and Andresito, and cultivates its own herbs in Valle Fértil, San Juan. Its facility, Planta Frontera in Santa Fé, functions as a bagging plant.

== Products ==
The company offers several varieties of yerba mate and related products. These include flavored yerba mate, blends combined with herbs, sweetened varieties, and varieties with added nutrients. The following categories summarize the varieties listed on their website.

Flavored varieties: ginger, guaraná, berries (blueberry, raspberry, cherry and strawberry), pear and green apple, tropical fruits (passion fruit, mango, papaya and orange), orange, grapefruit, and lemon.

Varieties with herbs: mountain herbs (including mint (Mentha), pennyroyal (Mentha pulegium) and peperina (Minthostachys verticillata)), herbs from the Cuyo region (pennyroyal (Mentha pulegium), boldo (Peumus boldus), fennel (Foeniculum vulgare), lemon balm (Melissa officinalis), incayuyo (Lippia integrifolia), coriander (Coriandrum sativum), chamomile (Chamaemelum nobile), mint), and herbs from the Argentinian littoral region (lemon verbena (Aloysia citrodora), mint and coriander with a touch of lime).

Sweetened varieties: “Endulife” (with stevia) and a variety sweetened with honey.

Vitamin-fortified varieties: “Silueta” (with sweet briar (Rosa rubiginosa), pennyroyal, fennel, Fucus, mint, lemon verbena and boldo, and vitamins B1, B2, B5, B6, B9, B12 and zinc), and “Regulasé” (with prebiotics and plum flavoring).
