= CBSE =

CBSE may refer to:

- CBSé, an Argentine beverage company
- CBSE-FM, an FM radio station licensed to Sept-Îles, Quebec, Canada
- Central Board of Secondary Education, a national-level board of education in India for public and private schools
- Component-based software engineering, a branch of software engineering
- Cloud-based software engineering, in technology, indicates a focus on software development, engineering practices, and methodologies specific to cloud-based applications and services
