= Brazilian tea culture =

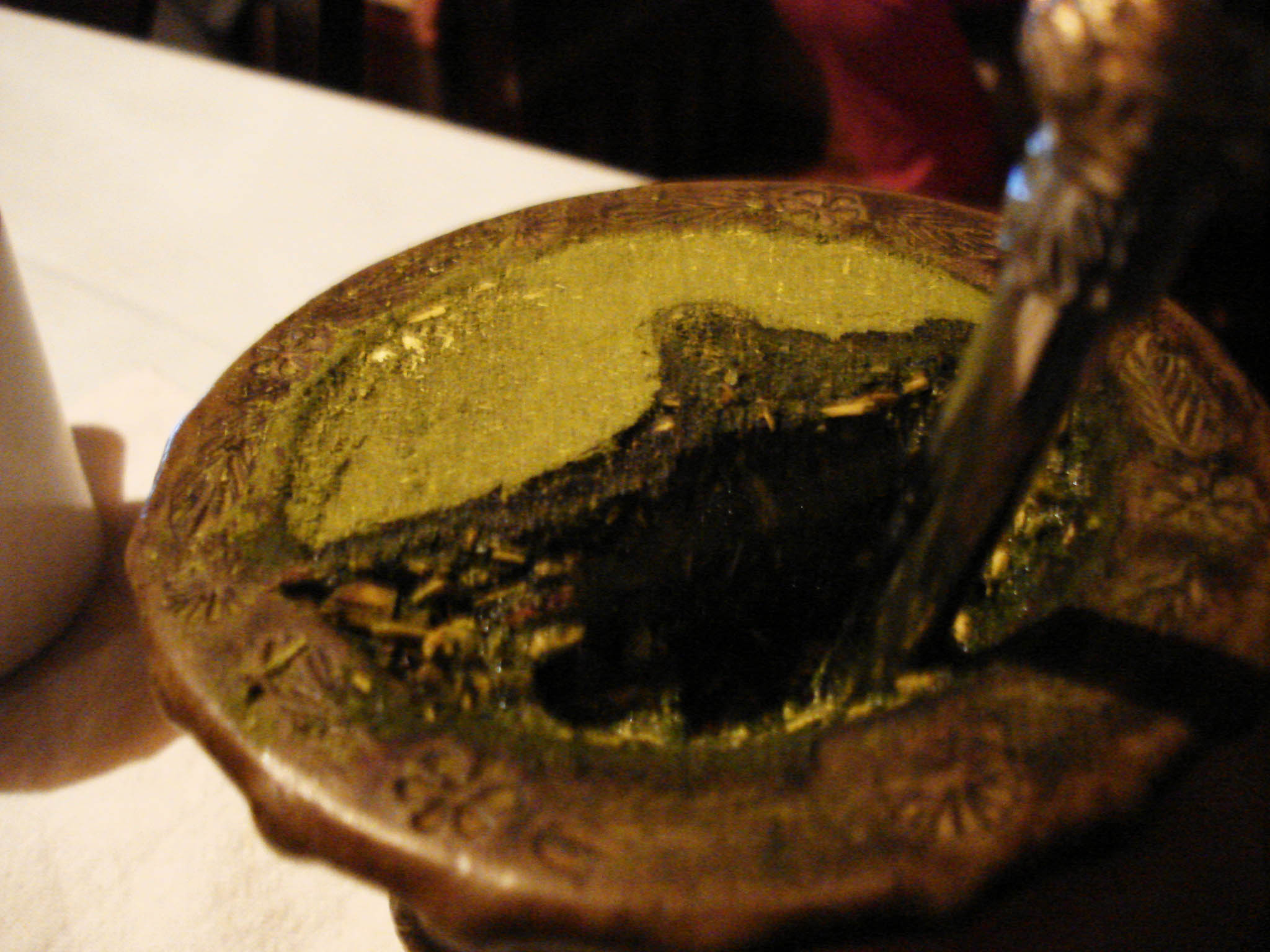
Mate infusion served in chimarrão cuia style.

Brazilian tea culture has its origins in the infused beverages, or chás (Portuguese pronunciation: [ˈʃas]), made by the indigenous cultures of the Amazon and the Río de la Plata basins. It has evolved since the Portuguese colonial period to include imported varieties and tea-drinking customs.

There is a popular belief in Brazil that Brazilians, especially the urban ones, have a greater taste for using sugar in teas than in other cultures accustomed to unsweetened drinks.

During the colonial era, imported tea varieties were first cultivated in Brazil in 1812. Throughout the 19th century, the tea industry, much like the coffee industry, was heavily dependent on slave labor to work on the plantations.

When slavery was abolished in 1888, the tea trade collapsed. In the 1920s, the tea industry was revived by Japanese immigrants, who introduced tea seeds from Sri Lanka and India. Prior to this time, only Chinese tea varieties had been grown in Brazil.

Brazil's largest tea-producing region is near Registro, a coastal city near São Paulo. Registro is in the Brazilian Highlands and forms a terrain of low rolling hills that are ideal for mechanized tea production. The growing season in Brazil is from September to April; the climate is hot and humid.

The relatively low altitude of most of Brazil's tea plantations, however, produces a tea which is less flavorful than high altitude teas. For this reason, Brazilian teas are most often produced for blending. The tea is used for both iced tea and hot tea blends with about 70% of the total tea production being sold to the United States.

== Erva-mate ==
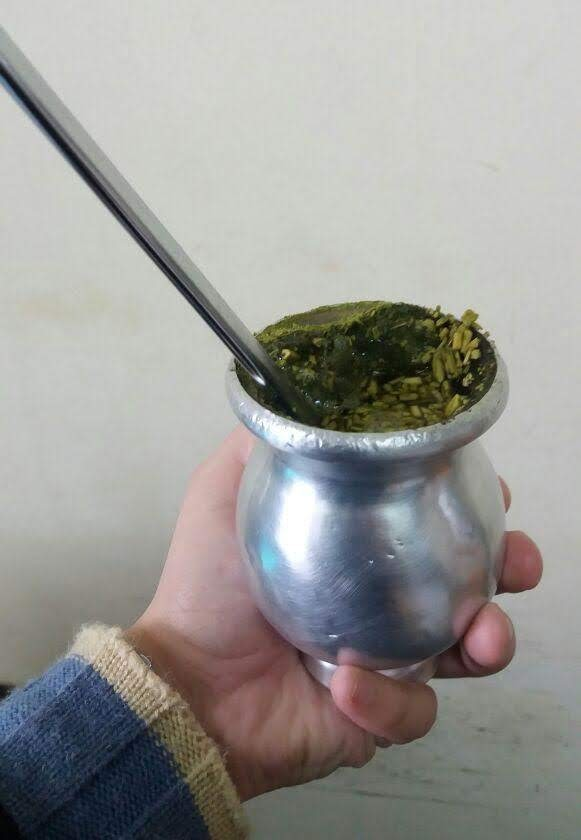
Erva mate in Brazil.

A popular caffeinated infusion is mate, made from the leaves of the native erva-mate plant. In Brazil, the plant is called erva-mate or simply mate, and the hot beverage drunk from a calabash gourd is called chimarrão, typically associated with the southernmost state, Rio Grande do Sul.

Mate is a popular beverage in other South American countries as well, especially around the people that lives in the southern region, which comprises the named Gaúcho culture, or the culture from the Pampas. Argentina, Paraguay, and Uruguay.

Specially in the Paraguayan and in a few parts of the northern Argentinian border, the mate is also drunk infused in cold water along the daytime and receives the name of tereré.

As in other South American countries, mate is traditionally drunk from a hollow gourd using a silver straw, a tradition that continues from indigenous cultures who introduced mate to colonists, though in other parts of the country, processed mate is drunk iced, as a non-carbonated soft drink.

Erva Mate (Ilex paraguariensis) is an evergreen plant of the holly (family Aquifoliaceae). The plant can reach heights of 10-12 meters but is generally pruned at about 4-6 meters.

Although the plant does produce small flowers and fruit, only the distinct oval-shaped leaves and stems are plucked for processing. In Brazil, the drinking of Erva Mate is practiced as a social ritual.

== Common modern varieties ==
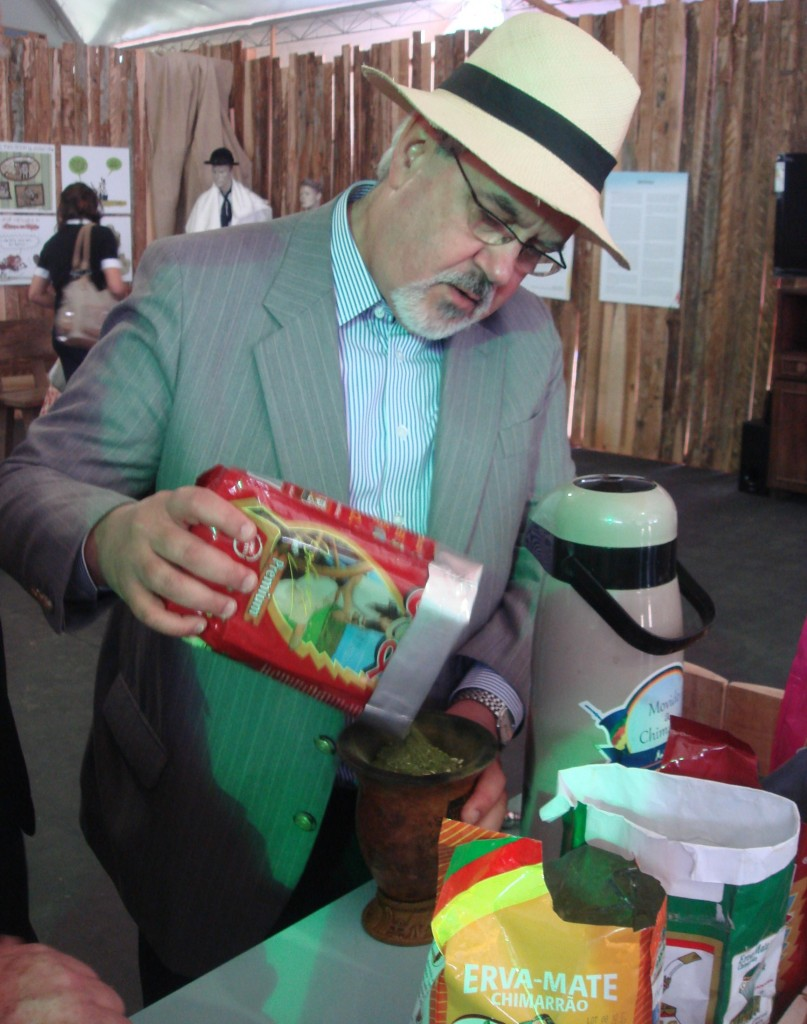
Brazilian preparing tea.

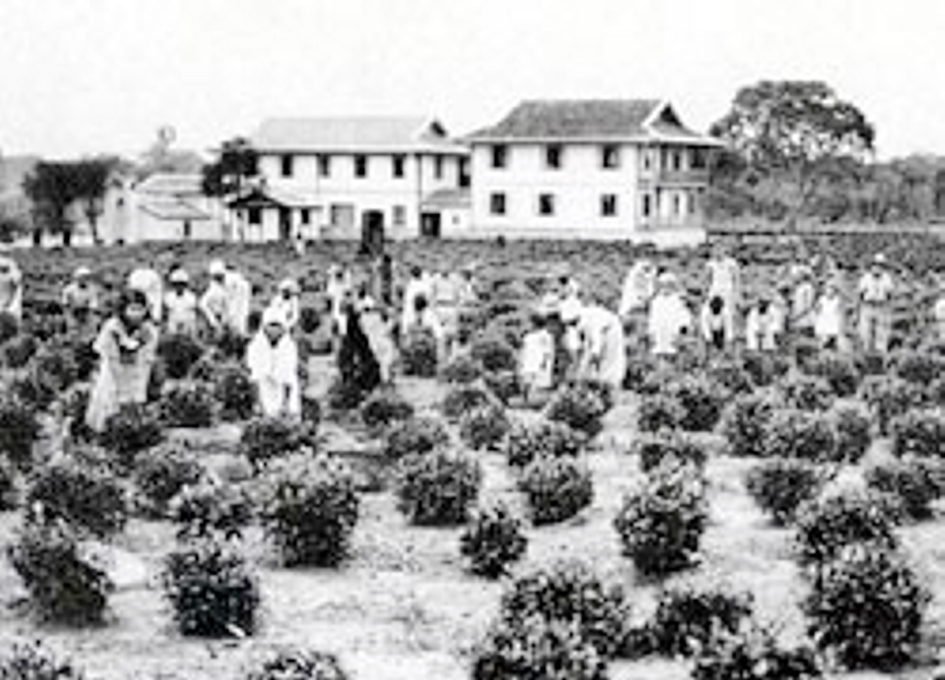
A Brazilian tea plantation around 1930. Tea leaves are harvested in this photo by Japanese immigrants.

True teas such as black tea (chá-preto) are popular in Brazil, either hot or iced. Brazilians also have their own local modern variations of flavored and herbal teas. Lemongrass teas are popular. Lemongrass is a plant imported from Southeast Asia, which grows well in Brazil's climate. Lemongrass is called capim-santo, capim-limão or capim cidreira. It is generally consumed in herbal teas and health drinks, which is its primary culinary use in Brazil. Like many infusions in Brazil, lemongrass beverages are considered more medicinal than culinary. One iced drink made of lemongrass and pineapple peelings is called chá de abacaxi com capim-santo, which means "pineapple-and-lemongrass tea".

Alongside lemongrass and mate, infusions from plants cultivated domestically or in small properties, usually served as everyday drinks, include the following: Melissa officinalis, the lemon balm, locally known as erva-cidreira or citronela; Mentha, the mint, there known as hortelã (IPA: [oʁteˈlɐ̃]) (though juices are much more popular — tea is usually made from processed dried mint in the market); Kyllinga odorata, in the genus of the plants known as spikesedges, in Portuguese: capim-cidreira; Foeniculum vulgare, the fennel, called erva-doce or funcho; Pimpinella anisum, the anise, there known as erva-doce or rarely anis; Illicium verum, the Chinese star anise, locally referred to as anis-estrelado; Aloysia citrodora, or lúcia-lima in Portuguese, the South American lemon verbena; among a few other plants of American, European or Asian origin.

Examples of plants commonly cultivated domestically in Brazil for medicinal uses include: Peumus boldus, the boldo, there known as boldo-do-chile (Chilean boldo); Plectranthus barbatus, the Indian coleus, locally known as boldo-de-jardim (garden boldo) or boldo-da-terra (earth boldo); Plantago major, the greater plantain, in Portuguese: tanchagem; Vernonia condensata, known as boldo-baiano; Vernonia polysphaera, called assa-peixe (lit. 'fish-fryer'); Chenopodium ambrosioides, there referred to as erva-de-santa-maria; Dysphania ambrosioides, the epazote, also known in Brazil as erva-de-santa-maria; Baccharis trimera, the carqueja; Maytenus ilicifolia, the espinheira-santa; Rhamnus purshiana, the cascara buckthorn, locally known as cáscara sagrada (sacred cascara); Echinodorus grandiflorus, the chapéu-de-couro (leather hat); Uncaria tomentosa, the cat's claw, which is unha-de-gato in Portuguese; Mimosa tenuiflora, the tepezcohuite, local name jurema-preta; among others.

== Indigenous teas ==
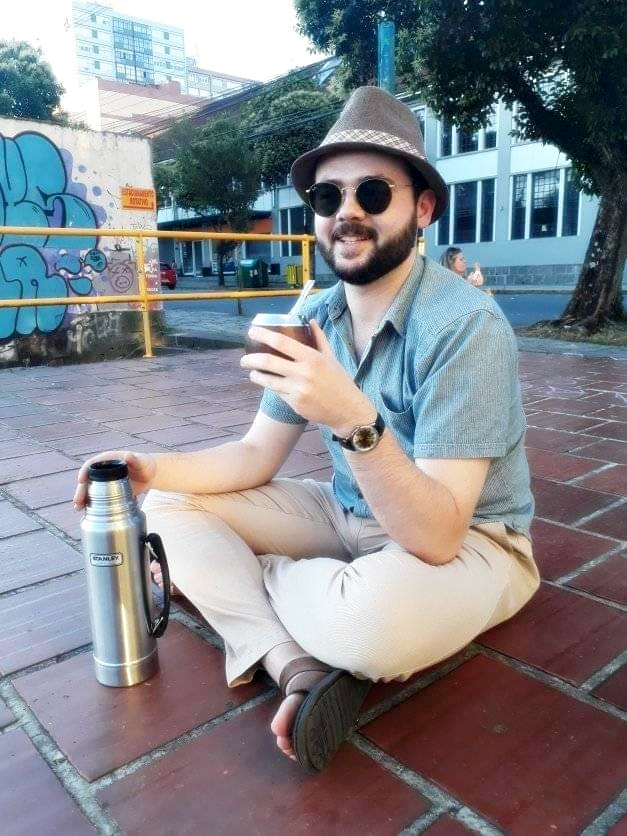
Brazilian drinking tea.

There are many indigenous herbs consumed as herbal teas in Brazil, which often have traditional medicinal uses. Some varieties are consumed as part of native religious rituals.

=== Mint tea ===
Mint tea, an infusion made from the brewed leaves of the plant Hyptis crenata, has been used by traditional healers to cure headaches, fevers and flu. Graciela Rocha, in research conducted for Newcastle University, found the drink to be as effective as a synthetic aspirin-style drug, Indometacin:

Rocha, who is Brazilian and remembers being given the tea as a cure for every childhood illness, said: "The taste isn't what most people here in the UK would recognise as a mint. In fact it tastes more like sage which is another member of the mint family.

=== Ayahuasca ===
Ayahuasca, which means "vine of souls" in a Quechua language, has a history going back to ancient times. It is a traditional drink used in spiritual and healing rituals. The drink is used in the religions of Santo Daime and "União do Vegetal". It has purgative, nauseating and hallucinogenic properties.

Due to its hallucinogenic effects, its legal status in Brazil has met with controversy from authorities outside Brazil. The active ingredient that produces hallucinations, DMT, is considered a Class A drug (the same label given to heroin and cocaine) by the U.S. and the U.K. However, in 2010 Brazil's national anti-drug body approved the consumption of the drink for religious rituals after decades of studies and talks with religious institutions.

== See also ==
- Tea
- Mate (beverage)
- Traditional medicine
- Health effects of tea
