= Tereré =

Infusion of yerba mate and cold water

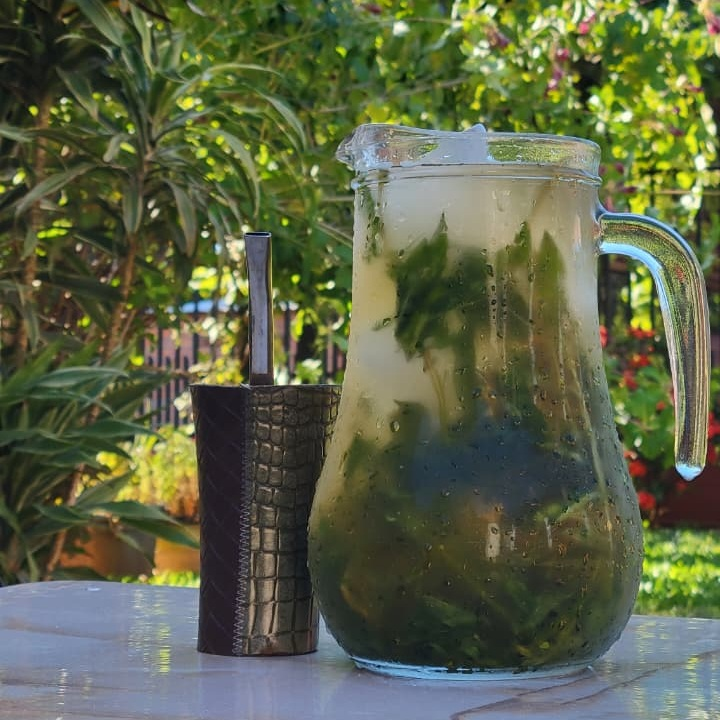
- Traditional tereré of water and herbs
- Type: Infusion
- Origin: Paraguay
- Ingredients: Yerba mate

Practices and traditional knowledge of Terere in the culture of Pohã Ñana, Guaraní ancestral drink in Paraguay
- UNESCO Intangible Cultural Heritage
- Country: Paraguay
- Reference: 01603
- Region: Latin America and the Caribbean

Inscription history
- Inscription: 2020 (17th session)
- List: Representative

Tereré
Nutritional value per 100 g (3.5 oz)
- Energy: 80 kcal (330 kJ)
- Fat: 0 mg
- Protein: 3 g
Vitamins and minerals
Vitamins	Quantity %DV^{†}
Thiamine (B1)	20% 0.242 mg
Riboflavin (B2)	54% 0.7 mg
Pantothenic acid (B5)	130% 6.5 mg
Vitamin C	1% 1 mg
Minerals	Quantity %DV^{†}
Calcium	51% 660 mg
Copper	306% 2.75 mg
Iron	262% 47.2 mg
Magnesium	88% 370 mg
Phosphorus	3% 34.4 mg
Potassium	37% 1096 mg
Zinc	86% 9.5 mg
Iodine	0% 32 μg
- ^{†}Percentages estimated using US recommendations for adults, except for potassium, which is estimated based on expert recommendation from the National Academies. Source: ABC Color

Tereré (of Guaraní origin) is an infusion of yerba mate (botanical name Ilex paraguariensis) prepared with cold water, plentiful ice, and pohã ñana (medicinal herbs) in a large vessel. This infusion has its roots in Pre-Columbian America, which established itself as traditional during the time of Governorate of Paraguay. There is also a variant made with juice, called "Juice tereré" or "Russian tereré", depending on the region. On December 17, 2020, UNESCO declared the tereré of Paraguay as an intangible cultural heritage, which includes the drink (tereré) and its preparation methods with medicinal herbs (pohá ñaná).

It is similar to mate —a drink also based on yerba mate—but with the difference that tereré is consumed cold, preferably in the warmer areas of the Southern Cone. It is traditional in Paraguay, where it is considered a cultural icon. In recent decades it has become popular in some areas of Southern Brazil, in Eastern Bolivia and in Argentina.

Both refreshing or medicinal herbs, called yuyos, are often added, such as pererina, cocú, mint, sarsaparille, horsetail family, burrito, agrial or wax begonia, batatilla, verbena, spikesedges, ajenjo, slender dayflower, escobilla, lemon balm, saffron crocus, ginger, taropé, perdudilla blanca and others. Currently, in Paraguay exist various franchises that sell flavored ice based on medicinal-refreshing weeds/fruits for consumption in the tereré.

Tereré has been declared the official drink of Paraguay and also a Cultural Heritage of the Nation. "National Tereré Day" is celebrated every last Saturday of February. By Resolution 219/2019, the National Secretariat of Culture declared the Traditional Practices and Knowledge of Tereré and Pohã Ñana culture as a National Intangible Cultural Heritage. The city of Itakyry has been the permanent headquarters of the "Festival of Tereré" since 1998.

== History ==
Originally consumed by the Guaraní, its use was adopted during the Guaraní-Jesuit Missions time in the area of their missions. Tereré was spread by the emigrants, and has been a social beverage for centuries. People usually prepare one jar of water and a guampa (or mate, or porongo) (Spanish) or cuia (Portuguese) with a bombilla (Spanish) or bomba (Portuguese) which is shared among the group of people. The area of the Guaraní-Jesuit Missions has a fairly hot climate and this drink is believed to refresh the body and can be a very low-calorie, non-alcoholic beverage. Additionally, it is an important ritual signifying trust and communion.

Many people drink tereré with added herbs, both medicinal and refreshing. In northeastern Argentina it is commonly prepared either with water, medicinal herbs and ice cubes (called tereré de agua (tereré prepared with water)) or citrus, as in south-western Brazil, with fruit juices like lemon, lime, orange, or pineapple. This practice varies depending on the region, for example, in the Formosa Province (Argentina), as well in the majority of Paraguay, it is normally prepared with medicinal herbs. In Southern Paraguay it is often prepared with citrus juice. Mixing fruit juices with tereré is commonly called tereré de jugo (tereré with juice)—in northeastern Argentina—or tereré ruso (Russian tereré)—more common in Paraguay—because this practice is more common with Slavic immigrants in the northeast of Argentina and southern Paraguay.

Guampas are containers that can be made from animal horns, commonly made from cattle horns, stainless steel, wood, mate porongo (a kind of cucurbit native from South America), or silver. Metal guampas are often covered with leather. New guampas or those not used for some time need to be wet before use, because the lower part is usually capped with a round piece of wood, which expands and prevents leaks after being filled with water.

A bombilla is a metal straw with a filter at one end that is placed into the yerba.} Water is added to the guampa and sucked through the bombilla producing a clear, green liquid.

== Preparation ==
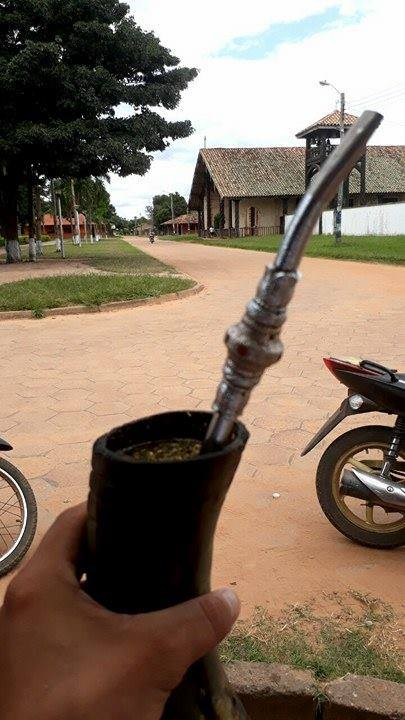
Tereré consumed from a guampa made of cattle horn with a silver bombilla

.

Most preparations of tereré begin by filling a guampa 2/3 to 3/4 full of yerba mate. Then, ice cubes are added to water and usually stored in a vacuum flask. If herbs or juice are part of the preparation, they are added to the water at this point. When consuming, the water is poured over the yerba held in the guampa and extracted from the yerba with a metallic straw (with a filter included on it) called "bombilla". The liquid is refilled as desired.

== Local customs ==
In Argentina, tereré is usually prepared with citrus juice and its consumption is increasing throughout the country, especially during the summer months, especially among younger millennials.

Tereré is part of the diet of native peoples of Argentina, such as the Qom people, who consume it within their diet based on stews and torta fritas or chipá cuerito. An investigation revealed that more than 90 percent of the Qom consume tereré frequently throughout the day.

Due to the hot climate, tereré is popular throughout the Central-West and Northern region of Brazil and is often prepared with a variety of juices, although coffee is still the most popular beverage in Brazil.

== See also ==
- Mate con malicia
- List of Brazilian dishes
