= Mate con malicia =

- Type: Mixed drink
- Ingredients: 70–80°C hot water; Grape aguardiente; Yerba mate
- Standard drinkware: Mate gourd and a bombilla
- Served: Hot or chilled straight up, without ice

Mate con malicia (Spanish: 'mate with malice') or mate con punta ('spiked mate') is a drink made of mate infusion and aguardiente or pisco, consumed mainly in rural areas of Chile. It combines the caffeine-rich properties of yerba mate with a strong spirit. Traditions involving mate con malicia include storytelling while passing the drink; historically it was also a popular drink at gatherings of women. In recent years, mate con malicia has appeared as a flavor of artisanal ice cream.
