= Mate (drink) =

Caffeine-rich infused herbal drink

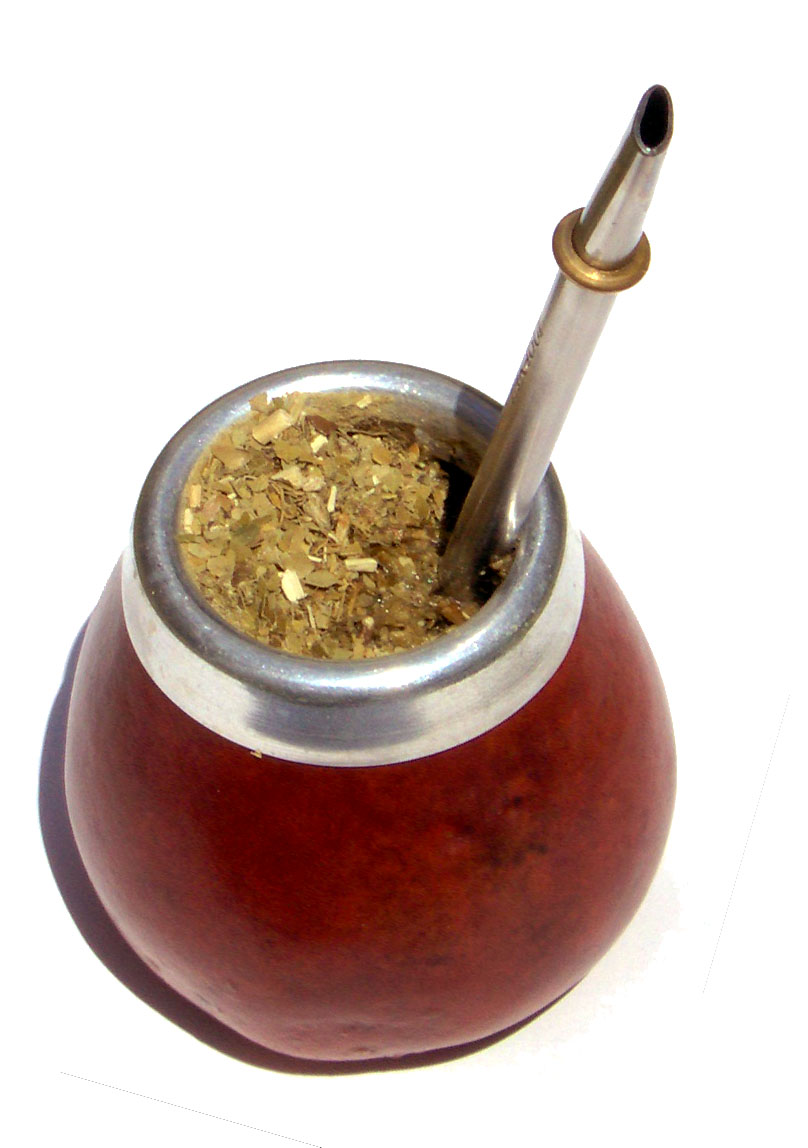
- Mate in a traditional calabash gourd (also called a mate) with a metal bombilla
- Type: Infusion, hot
- Origin: The territory of the Guaraní people (present-day Paraguay, the Misiones province of Argentina, southeastern Bolivia, southern Brazil and Uruguay)
- Introduced: Pre-Columbian era. First European written record by Spanish colonizers in the 15th century

Mate (/ˈmɑːteɪ/ MAH-tay; Spanish: mate [ˈmate], Brazilian Portuguese: [ˈmatʃi]) is a caffeine-rich infused herbal drink made with yerba mate (Ilex paraguariensis), a plant which originates in the Southern Cone of South America. It is especially popular in South America and the Levant. It is also known as chimarrão (Note: Portuguese: [ʃimɐˈʁɐ̃w]) in Portuguese, cimarrón (Note: Spanish: [simaˈron]) in Spanish, and ka'ay in Guarani. It is made by soaking dried yerba mate leaves in hot water and is traditionally served with a metal straw (bombilla) in a container typically made from a calabash gourd (also called the mate), from water-resistant hardwoods such as Handroanthus impetiginosus or Palo Santo, and also made from a cattle horn (guampa) in some areas. A very similar preparation, known as mate cocido, removes some of the plant material and sometimes comes in tea bags. Today, mate is also sold commercially in tea bags and as bottled iced tea.

Mate has been originally consumed by the Guaraní and Tupi peoples native to Paraguay, north-east of Argentina and South of Brazil. After European colonization, it was spread across the Southern Cone countries, namely Paraguay, Argentina, Uruguay and Chile, but it is also consumed in the South of Brazil and the Bolivian Chaco. Mate is the national beverage of Argentina, Paraguay and Uruguay. In Chile, mate is predominantly consumed in the central and southern regions. Mate is also common in Lebanon, Syria, Israel — where it was brought by immigrants from Argentina.

== Accessories ==
The metal straw is known as a bombilla or bomba and is traditionally made of silver. Modern straws are typically made of nickel silver, stainless steel, or hollow-stemmed cane. The bombilla functions both as a straw and as a sieve. The submerged end is flared, with small holes or slots that allow the brewed liquid in, but block the chunky yerba mate leaves that make up much of the mixture. A modern bombilla design uses a straight tube with holes or a spring sleeve to act as a sieve.

The container the mate is served in is also known as mate. (Note: Known as mate or a guampa in Spanish, or cuia or cabaça in Brazil.) It is commonly made from calabash gourd but may also be made out of other materials.

== History ==
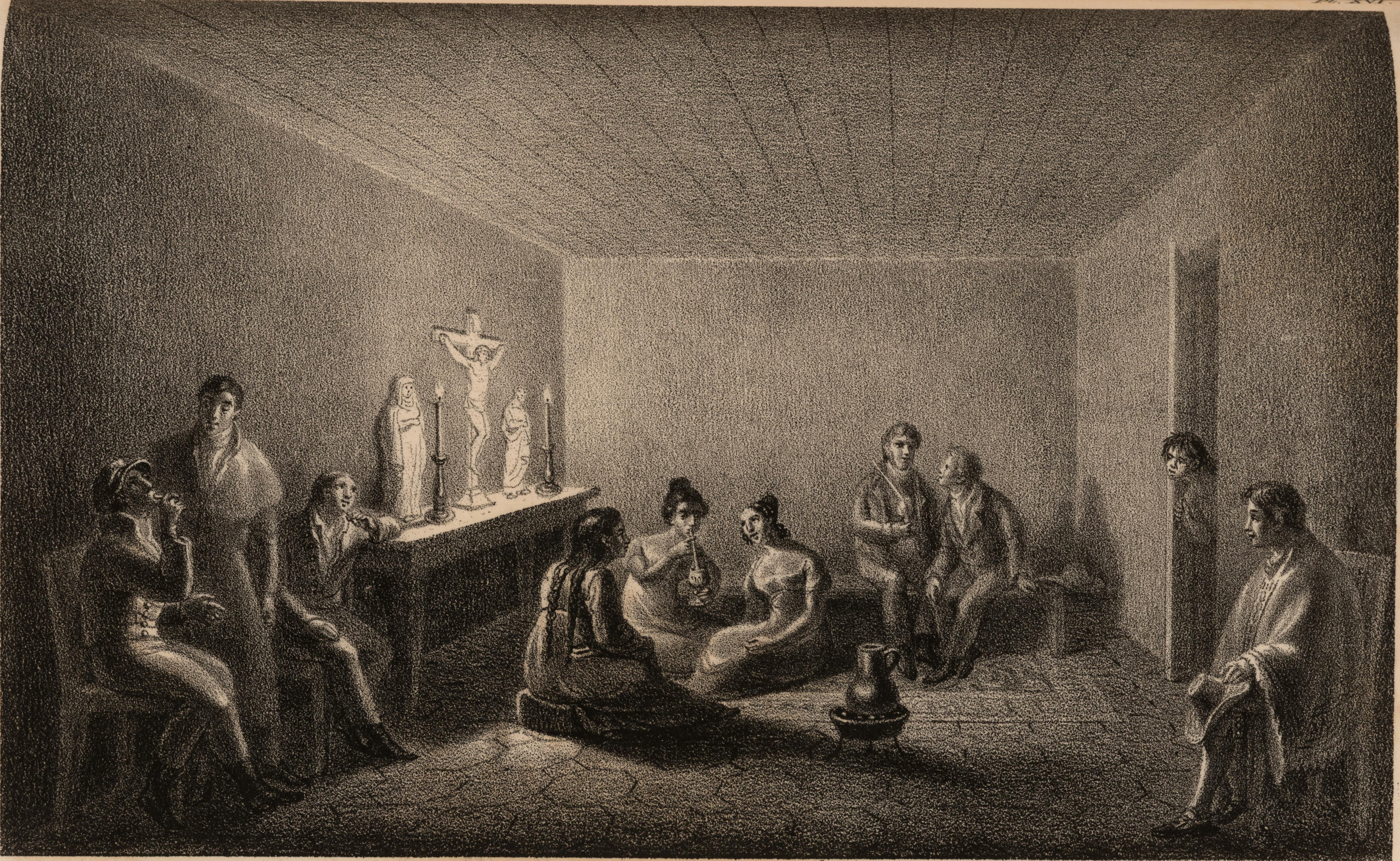
Tertulia and Mate party in Santiago de Chile, in 1821, by Scharf and Schmidtmeyer. John Carter Brown Library.

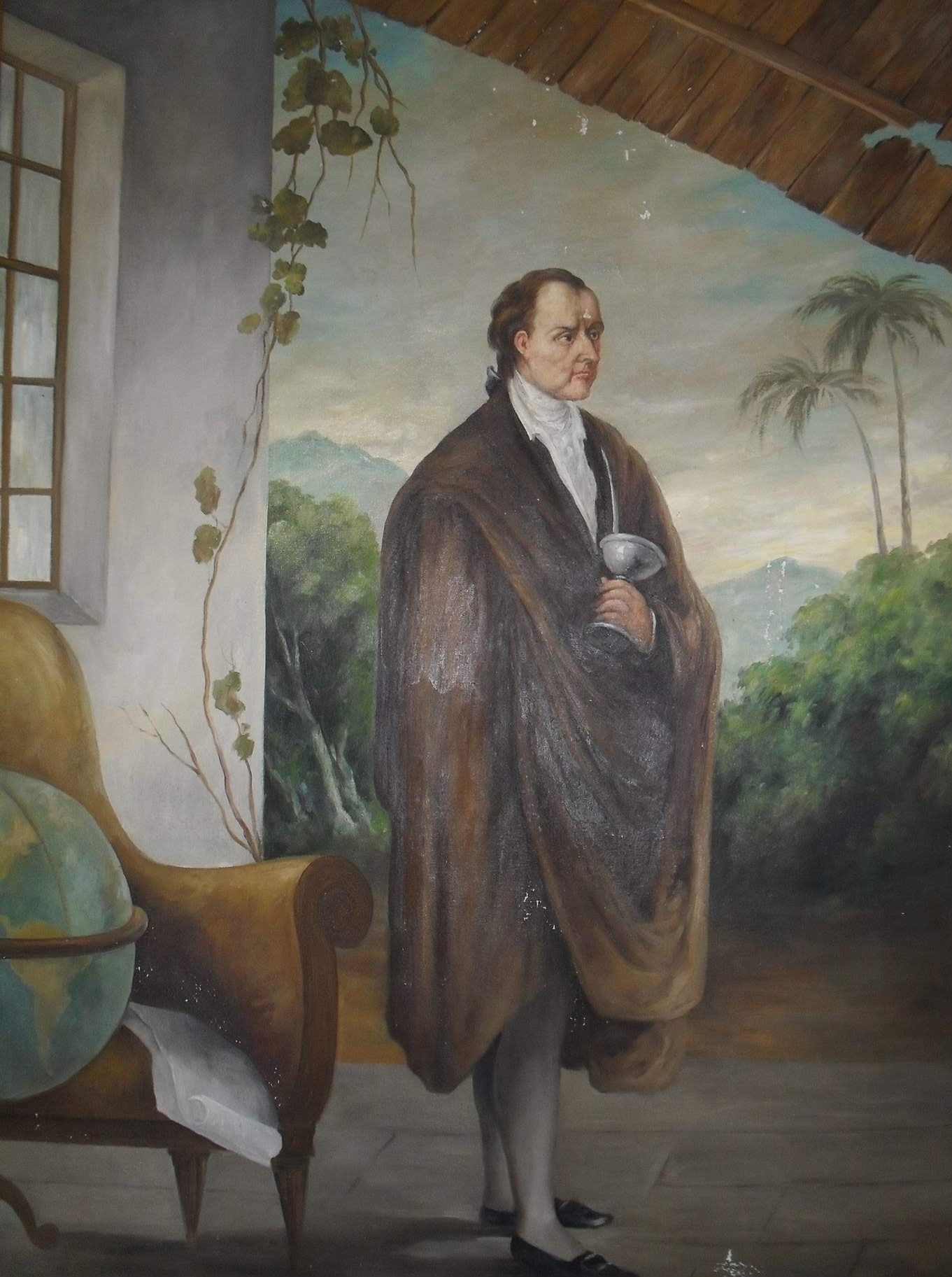
Lithograph of José Gaspar Rodríguez de Francia, a 19th-century ruler of Paraguay, with a mate and its bombilla (a straw)

Mate was first consumed by the indigenous Guaraní who live in what is now Paraguay, southeastern Brazil, Argentina, Bolivia, Uruguay, and the Tupí people who lived in neighbouring areas. Later, it spread to parts of southern Brazil and northeast Argentina, particularly areas that were Paraguayan territory before the Paraguayan War. Therefore, the scientific name of the yerba mate is Ilex paraguariensis.

With the Spanish colonization of Paraguay in the late 16th century the consumption of yerba mate spread to Spanish settlers, and in the 17th century to the Río de la Plata and from there to Peru and Chile. This widespread consumption turned it into Paraguay's main commodity above other wares such as tobacco, cotton and beef.

Aboriginal labour was originally used to harvest wild stands of yerba mate. In the mid-17th century, Jesuits managed to domesticate the plant and establish plantations in their Indian reductions in the Argentine province of Misiones, sparking severe competition with the Paraguayan harvesters of wild stands. After their expulsion in the 1770s, the Jesuit missions – along with the yerba mate plantations – fell into ruins. The industry continued to be of prime importance for the Paraguayan economy after independence, but development in benefit of the Paraguayan state halted after the Paraguayan War (1864–1870) that devastated the country both economically and demographically.

Brazil then became the largest producer of mate. In Brazilian and Argentine projects in the late 19th and early 20th centuries, the plant was domesticated once again, opening the way for plantation systems. When Brazilian entrepreneurs turned their attention to coffee in the 1930s, Argentina, which had long been the prime consumer, took over as the largest producer, resurrecting the economy of Misiones Province, where the Jesuits had once had most of their plantations. For years, the status of largest producer shifted between Brazil and Argentina.

As of 2018, Argentina was the largest producer with 56–62%, followed by Brazil, 34–36%, and Paraguay, 5%. Uruguay is the largest per capita consumer, consuming around 19 liters per person per year.

== Name ==
The English word comes from the French maté and the American Spanish mate, which means both mate and the vessel for drinking it, from the Quechua word mati for the calabash gourd used to make it.

Both the spellings "mate" and "maté" are used in English. The acute accent indicates that the word is pronounced with two syllables, like café, rather than like the one-syllable English word "mate". An acute accent is not used in the Spanish spelling, because the first syllable is stressed; "maté" with the stress on the second syllable means "I killed".

In Brazil, traditionally prepared mate is known as chimarrão, although the Portuguese word mate and the expression "mate amargo" (bitter mate) are also used in Argentina and Uruguay. The Spanish cimarrón means "rough", "brute", or "barbarian", but is most widely understood to mean "feral", and is used in almost all of Latin America for domesticated animals that have become wild. The word was then used by the people who colonized the region of the Río de la Plata to describe the natives' rough and sour drink, drunk with no other ingredient to sweeten the taste.

== Culture ==
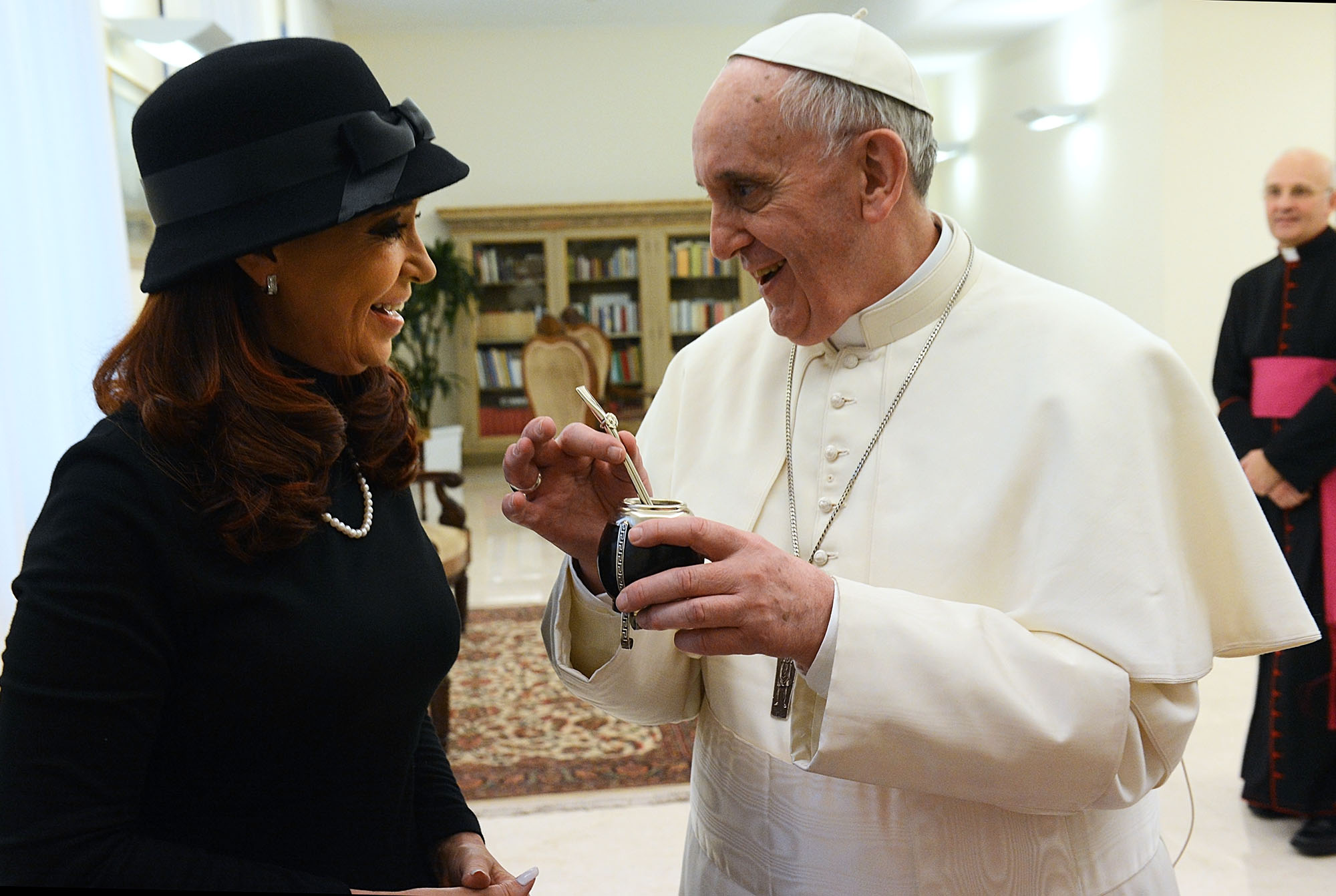
Pope Francis holds a guampa and bombilla given as a gift while speaking with Argentine President Cristina Fernández de Kirchner (2013)

Mate has a strong cultural significance for both national identity and society. Yerba mate is the national drink of Argentina and Paraguay, where it is also consumed with either hot or ice cold water (see tereré); and Uruguay. Drinking mate is a common social practice in all of the territory of Paraguay and Argentina, Brazil, Uruguay, southern Chile, and eastern Bolivia. Throughout the Southern Cone, it is considered to be a tradition taken from the Guaraní people and drunk by the gauchos or vaqueros, terms commonly used to describe the historical residents of the South American pampas, chacos, or Patagonian grasslands, found principally in parts of Argentina, Paraguay, Uruguay, southeastern Bolivia, southern Chile and southern Brazil. Argentina has celebrated National Mate Day every 30 November since 2015.

Parque Histórico do Mate, funded by the state of Paraná (Brazil), is a park aimed to educate people on the sustainable harvesting methods needed to maintain the integrity and vitality of the oldest wild forests of yerba mate in the world.

Mate is also consumed as an iced tea in various regions of Brazil, originating both from a sweetened industrialized form, produced by Matte Leão, and from artisanal producers. It is part of the beach culture in Rio de Janeiro, where it is widely sold by beach vendors; the hot infused variation being uncommon in the area.

== Preparation ==
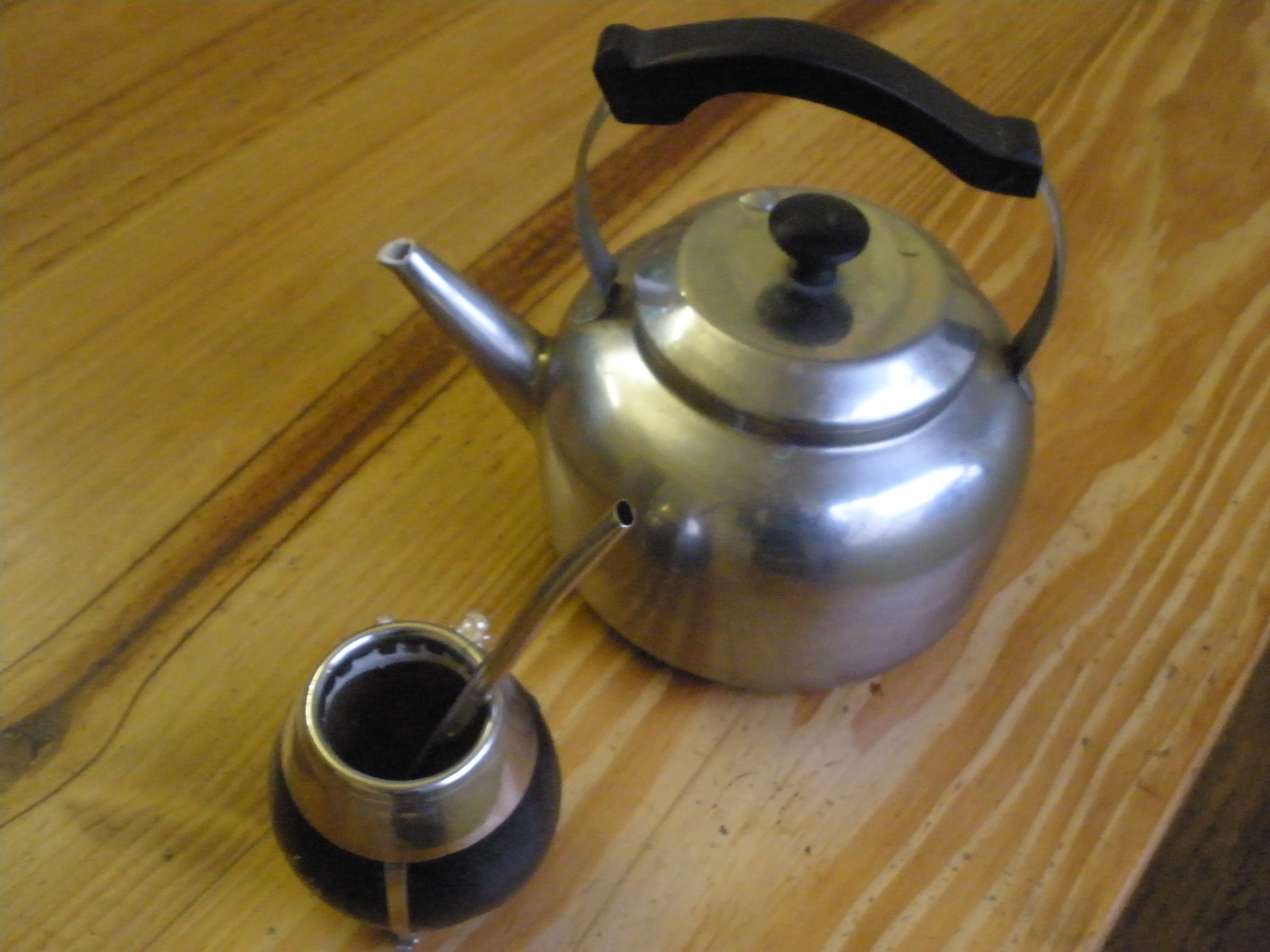
A traditional calabash gourd with a kettle

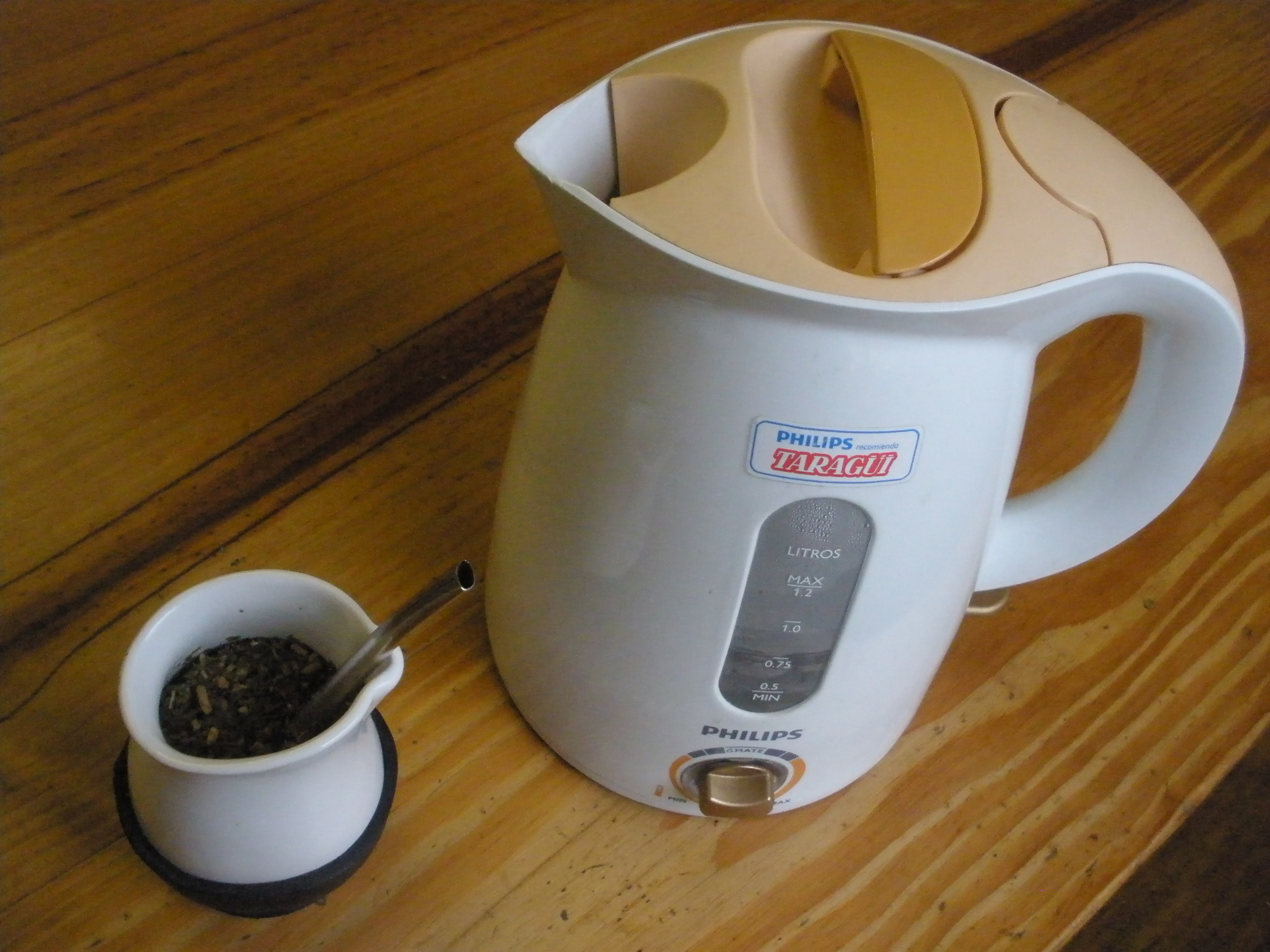
A modern mate with an electric kettle, note that the kettle has a specific mate temperature setting

The preparation of mate is a simple process, consisting of filling a container with yerba, pouring hot, but not boiling, water over the leaves, and drinking with a straw, the bombilla, which acts as a filter so as to draw only the liquid and not the yerba mate leaves. The method of preparing the mate infusion varies considerably from region to region, and which method yields the finest outcome is debated. However, nearly all methods have some common elements. The beverage is traditionally prepared in a gourd vessel, also called mate in Spanish and cuia (= gourd) in Portuguese, from which it is drunk. The gourd is nearly filled with yerba and hot water, typically at 70 to 85 °C (158 to 185 °F), which may be called "mate temperature".

The most common preparation involves a careful arrangement of the yerba within the gourd before adding hot water. In this method, the gourd is first filled one-half to three-quarters of the way with yerba. Too much yerba will result in a "short" mate; conversely, too little yerba results in a "long" mate, both being considered undesirable. After that, any additional herbs (yuyo, in Portuguese jujo) may be added for either health or flavor benefits, a practice most common in Paraguay, where people acquire herbs from a local yuyera (herbalist) and use the mate as a base for their herbal infusions. When the gourd is adequately filled, the preparer typically grasps it with the full hand, covering and roughly sealing the opening with the palm. Then the mate is turned upside-down, and shaken vigorously, but briefly and with gradually decreasing force, in this inverted position. This causes the finest, most powdery particles of the yerba to settle toward the preparer's palm and the top of the mate.

Once the yerba mate has settled, the mate is carefully brought to a near-sideways angle, with the opening tilted just slightly upward of the base. The mate is then shaken very gently with a side-to-side motion. This further settles the yerba mate inside the gourd so that the finest particles move toward the opening and the yerba is layered along one side. The largest stems and other bits create a partition between the empty space on one side of the gourd and the lopsided pile of yerba on the other.

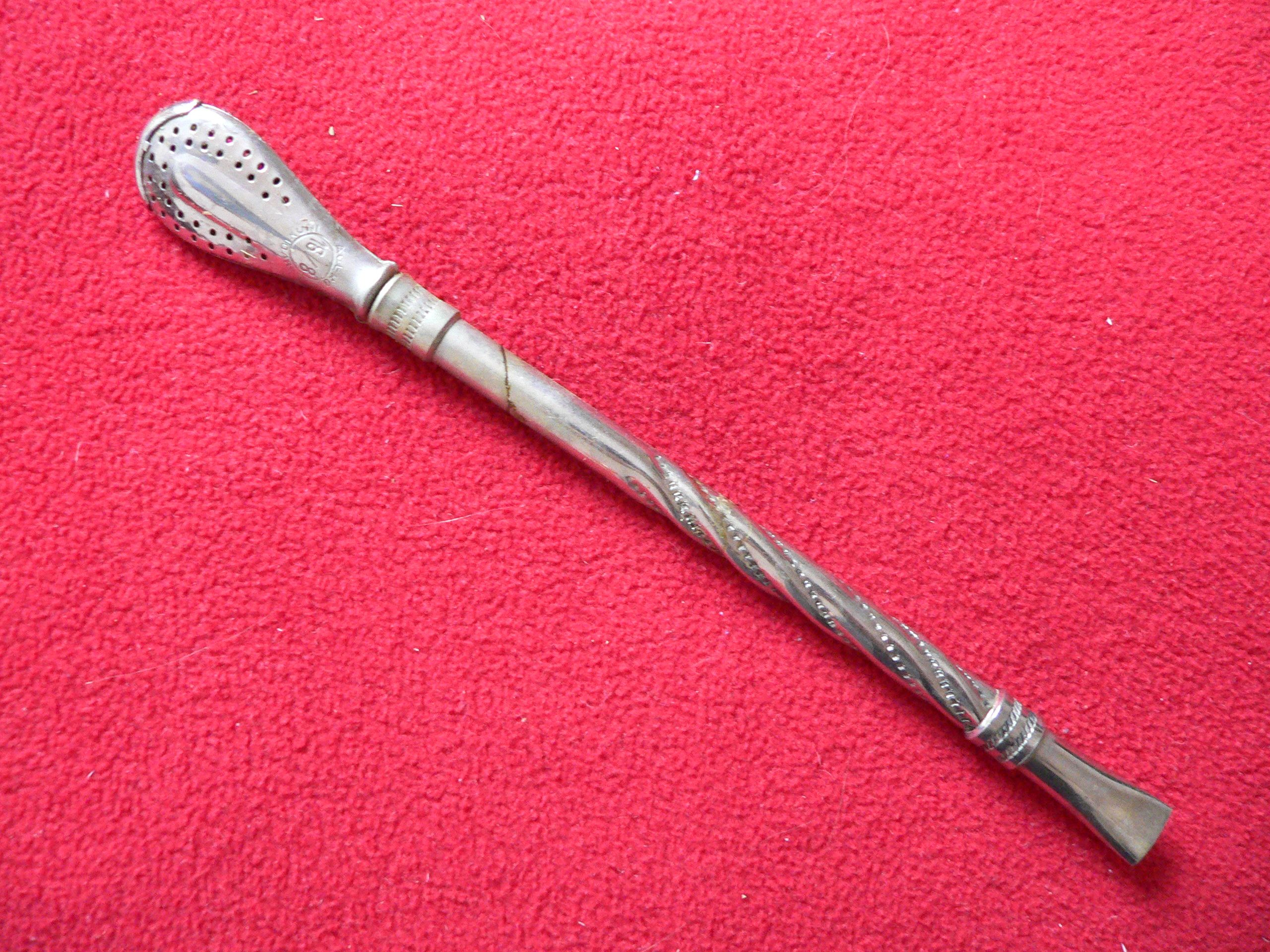
A typical bomba/bombilla or straw

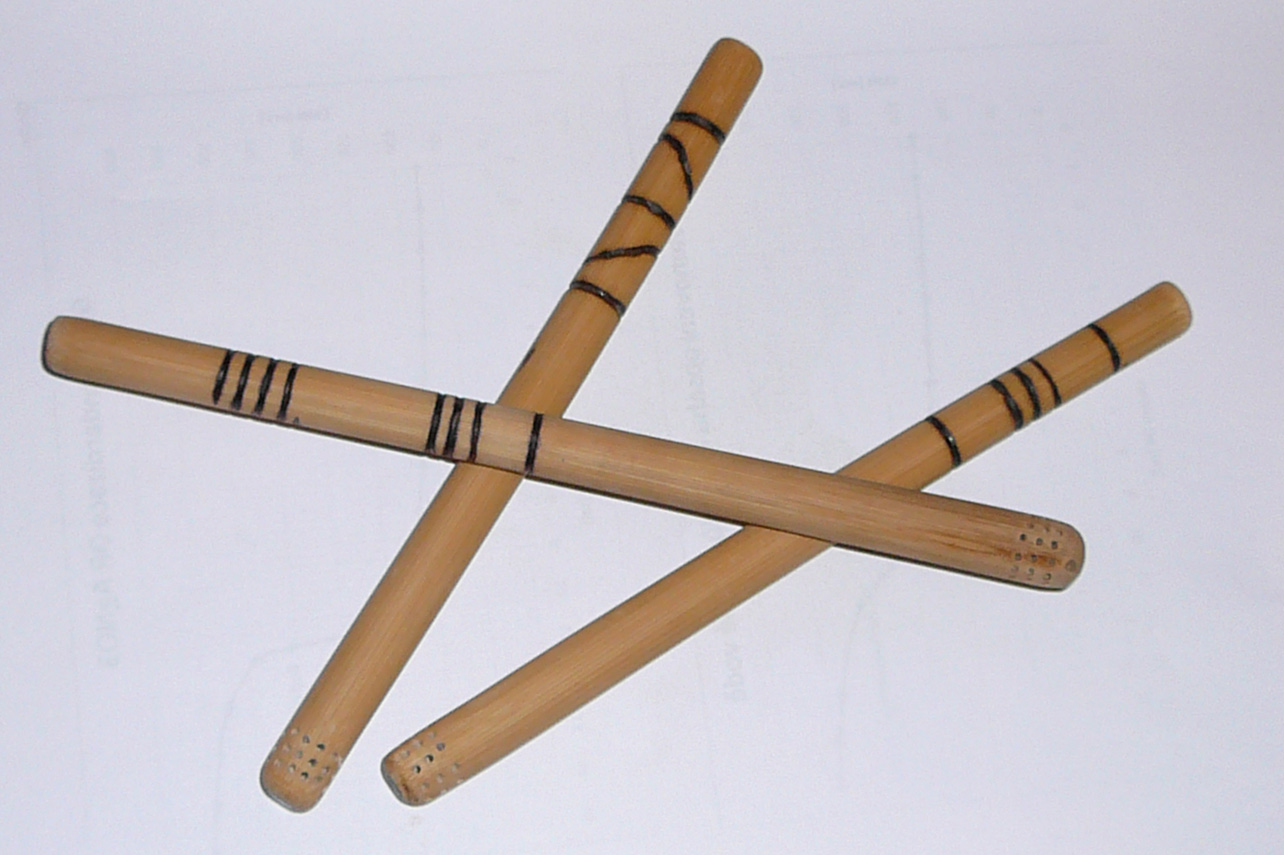
Homemade bamboo bombillas

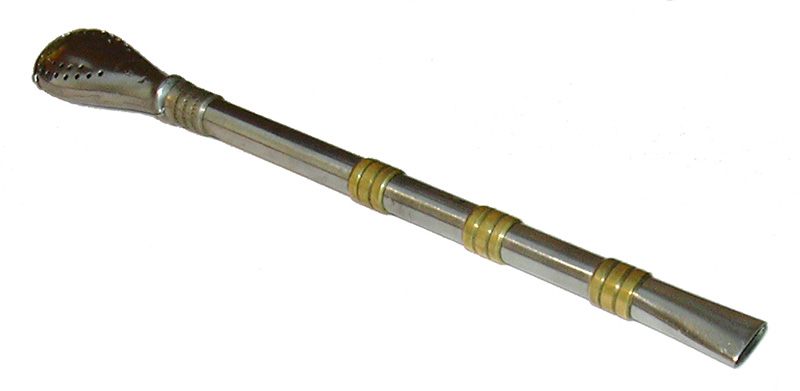
An ornate silver bombilla

After arranging the yerba along one side of the gourd, the mate is carefully tilted back onto its base, minimizing further disturbances of the yerba as it is re-oriented to allow consumption. Some settling is normal, but is not desirable. The angled mound of yerba should remain, with its powdery peak still flat and mostly level with the top of the gourd. A layer of stems along its slope will slide downward and accumulate in the space opposite the yerba (though at least a portion should remain in place).

All of this careful settling of the yerba ensures that each sip contains as little particulate matter as possible, creating a smooth-running mate. The finest particles will then be as distant as possible from the filtering end of the straw. With each draw, the smaller particles would inevitably move toward the straw, but the larger particles and stems filter much of this out. A sloped arrangement provides consistent concentration and flavor with each filling of the mate.

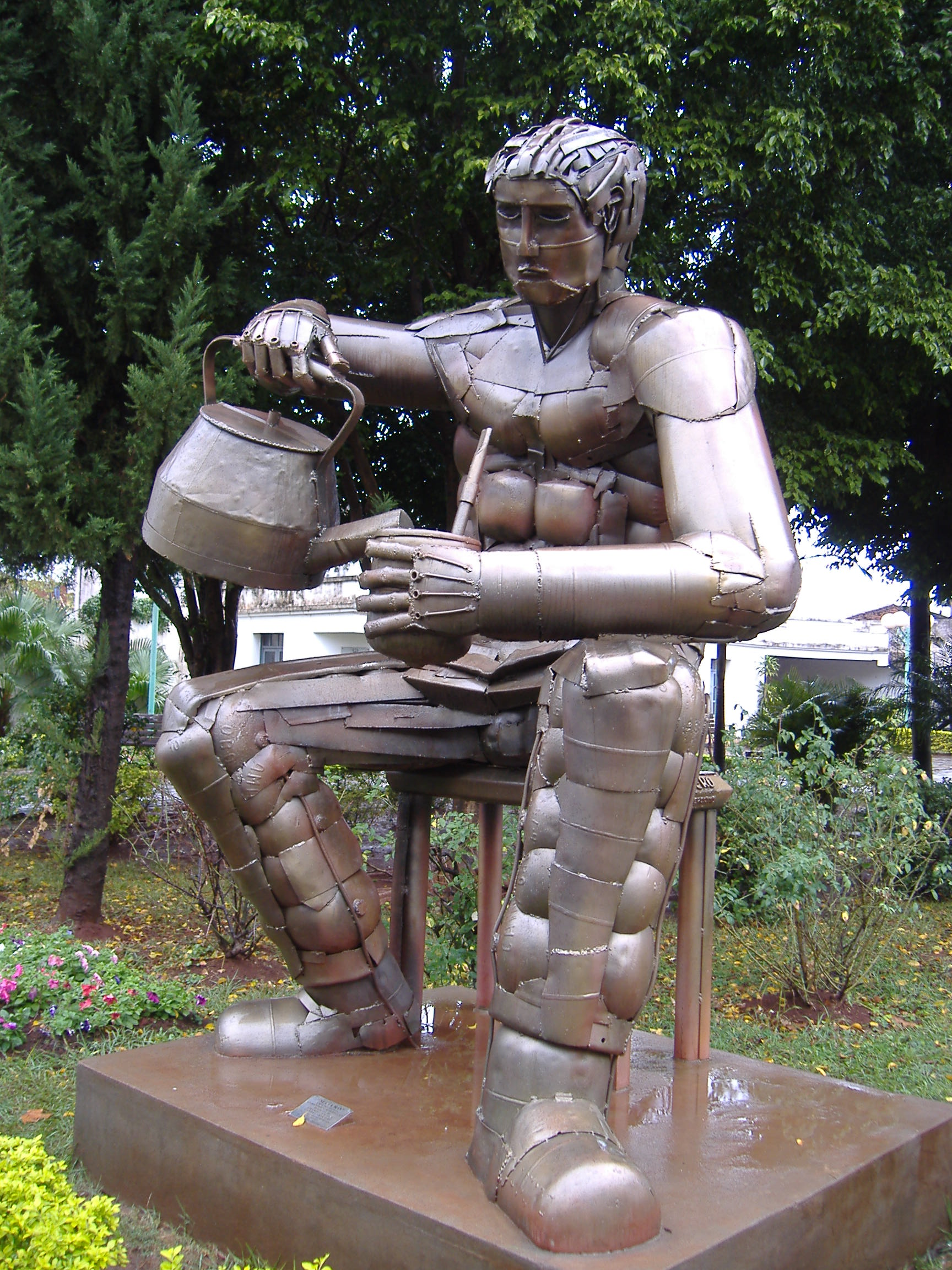
Statue of a man serving mate, in Posadas, Misiones, Argentina

Now the mate is ready to receive the straw. Wetting the yerba by gently pouring cool water into the empty space within the gourd until the water nearly reaches the top, and then allowing it to be absorbed into the yerba before adding the straw, allows the preparer to carefully shape and "pack" the yerba's slope with the straw's filtering end, which makes the overall form of the yerba within the gourd more resilient and solid. Dry yerba, though, allows a cleaner and easier insertion of the straw, but care must be taken so as not to overly disturb the arrangement of the yerba. Such a decision is entirely a personal or cultural preference. The straw is inserted with one's thumb and index finger on the upper end of the gourd, at an angle roughly perpendicular to the slope of the yerba, so that its filtering end travels into the deepest part of the yerba and comes to rest near or against the opposite wall of the gourd. It is important for the thumb to form a seal over the end of the straw when it is being inserted, or the air current produced in it will draw in undesirable particulates.

=== Brewing ===
After the above process, the yerba may be brewed. If the straw is inserted into dry yerba, the mate must first be filled once with cool water as above, then be allowed to absorb it completely (which generally takes no more than two or three minutes). Treating the yerba with cool water before the addition of hot water is essential, as it protects the yerba mate from being scalded and from the chemical breakdown of some of its desirable nutrients. Hot water may then be added by carefully pouring it, as with the cool water before, into the cavity opposite the yerba, until it reaches almost to the top of the gourd when the yerba is fully saturated. Care should be taken to maintain the dryness of the swollen top of the yerba beside the edge of the gourd's opening.

Once the hot water has been added, the mate is ready for drinking, and it may be refilled many times before becoming lavado (washed out) and losing its flavor. When this occurs, the mound of yerba can be pushed from one side of the gourd to the other, allowing water to be added along its opposite side; this revives the mate for additional refillings and is called "reformar o/el mate" (reforming the mate).

== Etiquette ==
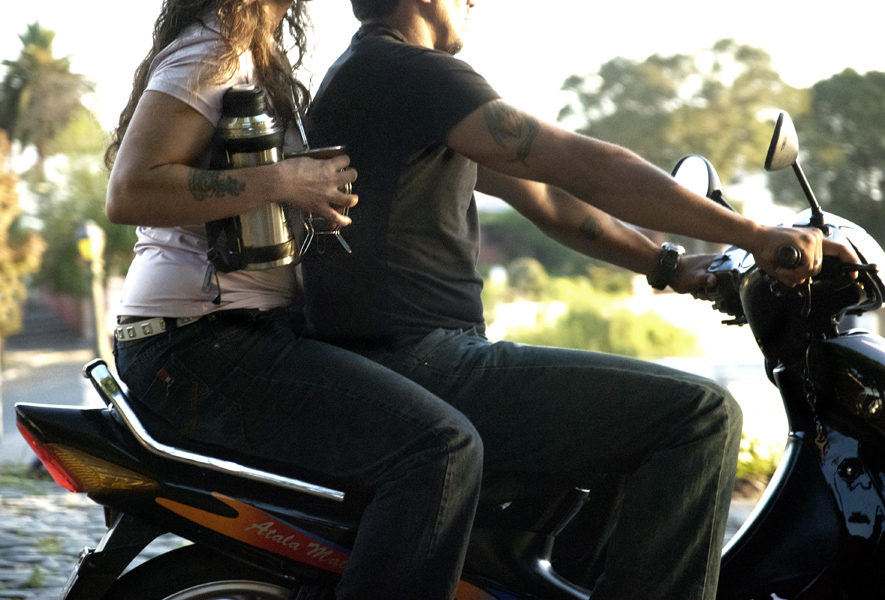
Mate drinking in public is commonplace

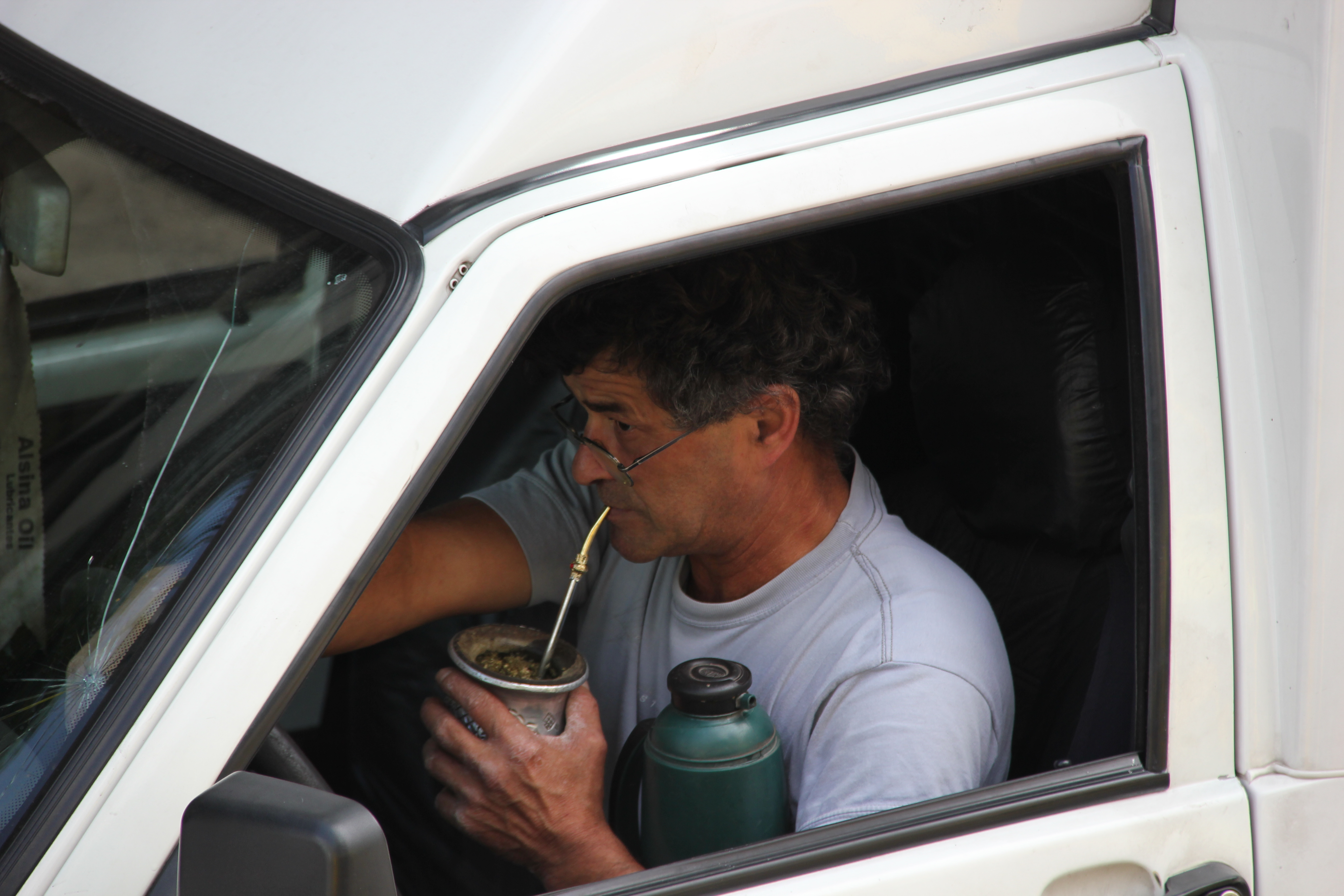
A man drinking mate in a car

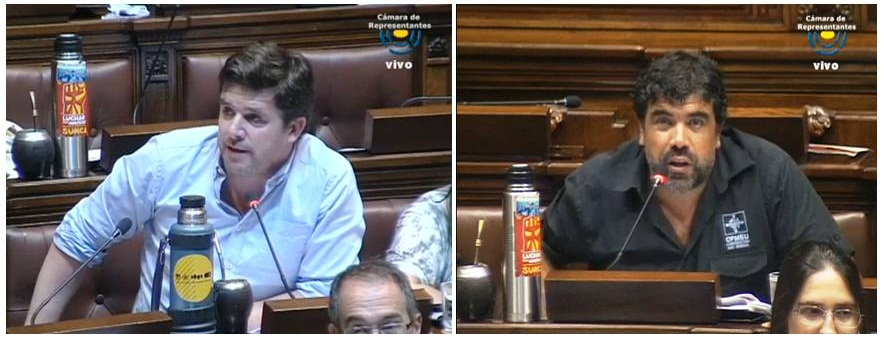
Uruguayan senators drink mate in parliament

Mate is traditionally drunk in a particular social setting, such as family gatherings or with friends. The same gourd (cuia/mate) and straw (bomba/bombilla) are used by everyone drinking. One person (known in Portuguese as the preparador, cevador, or patrão, and in Spanish as the cebador) assumes the task of server, which most of the time is the house owner in family gatherings. Typically, the cebador fills the gourd and drinks the mate completely to ensure that it is free of particulate matter and of good quality. In some places, passing the first brew of mate to another drinker is considered bad manners, as it may be too cold or too strong; for this reason, the first brew is often called mate del zonzo (fool's mate). The cebador possibly drinks the second filling as well, if they deem it too cold or bitter. The cebador subsequently refills the gourd and passes it to the drinker to their right, who likewise drinks it all (there is not much; the mate is full of yerba, with room for little water), and returns it without thanking the server; a final gracias or obrigado (thank you) implies that the drinker has had enough. The only exception to this order is if a new guest joins the group; in this case the new arrival receives the next mate, and then the cebador resumes the order of serving, and the new arrival will receive theirs depending on their placement in the group. When no more tea remains, the straw makes a loud sucking noise, which is not considered rude. The ritual proceeds around the circle in this way until the mate becomes lavado (washed out), typically after the gourd has been filled about 10 times or more depending on the yerba used (well-aged yerba mate is typically more potent, so provides a greater number of refills) and the ability of the cebador. When one has had one's fill of mate, they politely thank the cebador, passing the mate back at the same time. It is impolite for anyone but the cebador to move the bombilla or otherwise mess with the mate; the cebador may take offense to this and not offer it to the offender again. When someone takes too long, others in the round (roda in Portuguese, ronda in Spanish) will likely politely warn them by saying "bring the talking gourd" (cuia de conversar); an Argentine equivalent, especially among young people, being no es un micrófono ("it's not a microphone"), an allusion to the drinker holding the mate for too long, as if they were using it as a microphone to deliver a lecture.

Some drinkers like to add sugar or honey, creating mate dulce or mate doce (sweet mate), instead of sugarless mate amargo (bitter mate), a practice said to be more common in Brazil outside its southernmost state. Some people also like to add lemon or orange peel, some herbs or even coffee, but these are mostly rejected by people who like to stick to the "original" mate. Traditionally, natural gourds are used, though wood vessels, bamboo tubes, and gourd-shaped mates, made of ceramic or metal (stainless steel or even silver) are also common, as are vessels made from cattle horns. The gourd is traditionally made out of the porongo or cabaça fruit shell. Gourds are commonly decorated with silver, sporting decorative or heraldic designs with floral motifs. Some gourd mates with elaborated silver ornaments and silver bombillas are true pieces of jewelry and are sought after by collectors.

== Contaminants ==
Column chart displaying Benzo(a)pyrene concentration in processed yerba mate leaves sampled in 2006, 2008, and 2010: 2006 batches 2008 batches 2010 batches

Traditional preparation of yerba mate leaves involves smoking them and for this reason they contain a high number of polycyclic aromatic hydrocarbons (PAHs), such as benzo(a)pyrene, which are carcinogenic. It has been suggested that this may explain cancers associated with mate consumption, such as lung and bladder cancer, that cannot be attributed to its hot temperature. Instead, the hot temperature of mate (above 65°C) is specifically linked to oesophageal cancer. However, the occurrence of PAHs in yerba mate leaves and infusion is based on small studies with non-representative sampling. In any case, the use of mate with potentially lower PAHs content, such as unsmoked mate, has been suggested as a preventive approach.

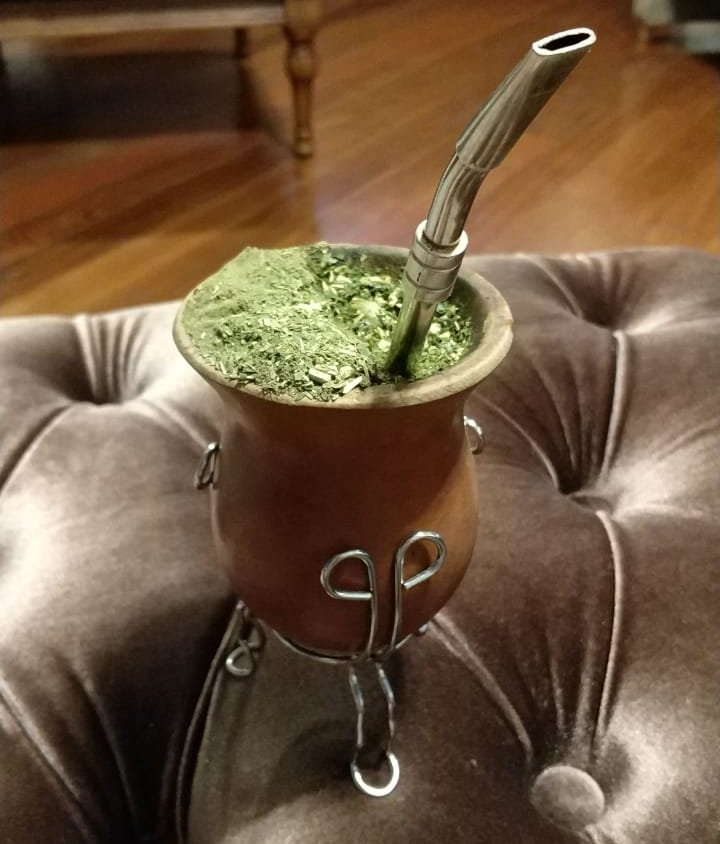
Brazilian-style chimarrão

== Other properties ==
Mate is a rich source of caffeine. On average, mate tea contains 92 mg of chlorogenic acid per gram of dry leaves, and no catechins, giving it a significantly different polyphenol profile from other teas.

According to Argentine culture in part promoted by marketers, the stimulant in mate is actually a substance called mateína (named after the drink). However, analysis of the active chemicals in yerba mate has found that mateína is caffeine.

== Legendary origins ==
The Guaraní people started drinking mate in a region that currently includes Paraguay, southern Brazil, southeastern Bolivia, northeastern Argentina and Uruguay. They have a legend that the Goddesses of the Moon and the Cloud came to visit the Earth one day. An old man saved them from a yaguareté (jaguar) that was going to attack them. The goddesses gave him a new kind of plant, from which he could prepare a "drink of friendship" as compensation for his actions.

== Variants ==
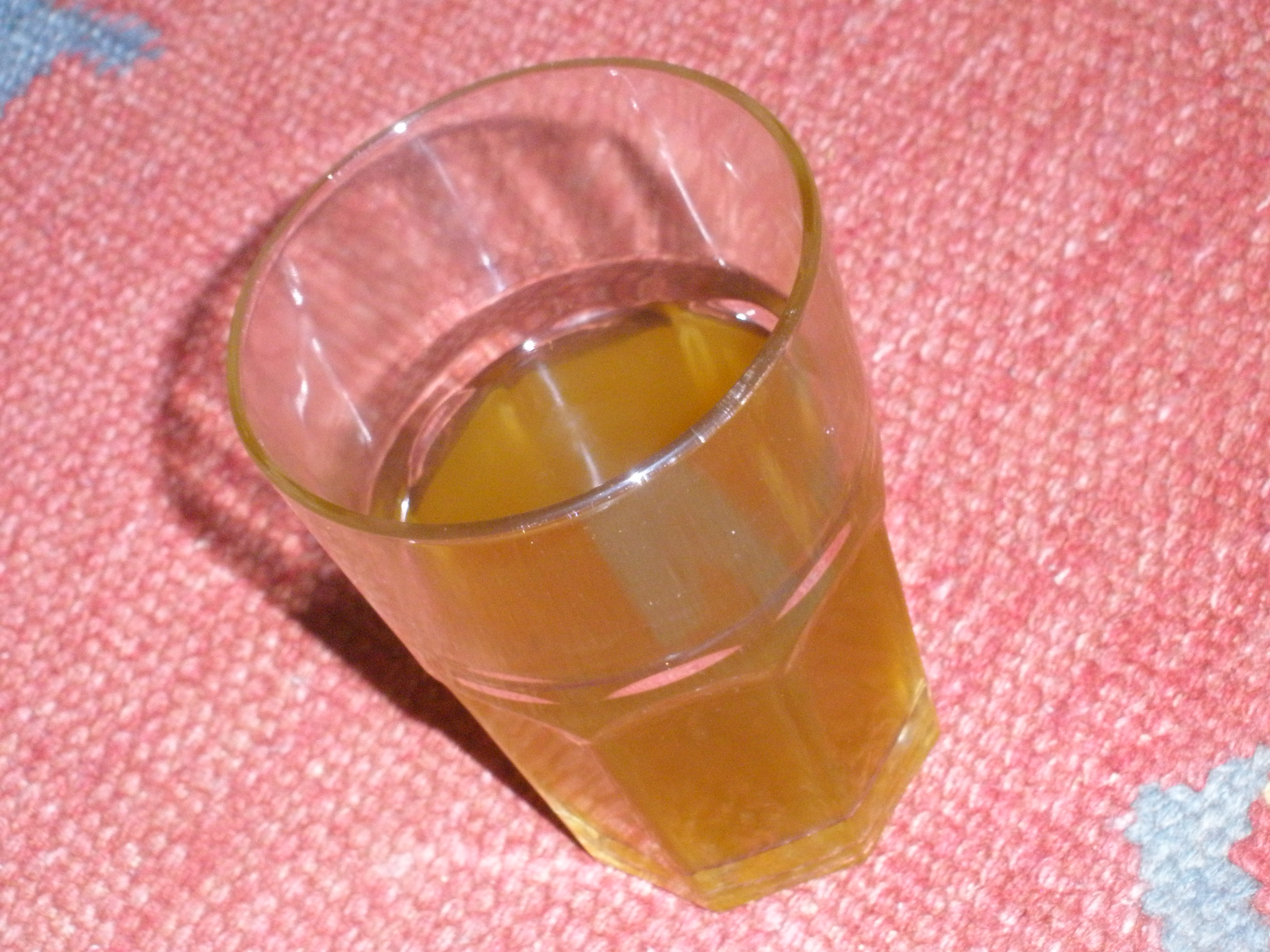
Iced mate cocido

There various types of yerba mate used to make the drink, depending on the processing and composition. Some key types include:

- Con palo – a mix of stems and ground leaf
- Sin palo – despalada: without stems or very little stem content
- Compuesta – Mixed with other herbs and plants, like mint
- Saborizada – in which the leaf has been flavored with flavorings and food additives
- Para tereré – made specifically for tereré, usually with other herbs like mint etc
- Barbacuá – toasted mate
- Cocido/Saquitos – bagged, similar to tea bags

Another drink can be prepared with specially cut dry leaves, very cold water, and, optionally, lemon or another fruit juice, called tereré. It is very common in Paraguay, northeastern Argentina and in the state of Mato Grosso do Sul, Brazil. After pouring the water, it is considered proper to "wait while the saint has a sip" before the first person takes a drink. In southern Brazil, tererê is sometimes used as a derogatory term for a not hot enough chimarrão.

In Uruguay and Brazil, the traditional gourd is usually big with a corresponding large hole. In Argentina (especially in the capital Buenos Aires), the gourd is small and has a small hole and people sometimes add sugar for flavor.

In Uruguay, people commonly walk around the streets toting a mate and a thermos with hot water. In some parts of Argentina, gas stations sponsored by yerba mate producers provide free hot water to travelers, specifically for the purpose of drinking during the journey. Disposable mate sets with a plastic mate and straw and sets with a thermos flask and stacking containers for the yerba mate and sugar inside a fitted case are available.

In Argentina, mate cocido (boiled mate), in Brazil, chá mate, is made with a tea bag or leaves and drunk from a cup or mug, with or without sugar and milk. Companies such as Cabrales from Mar del Plata and Establecimiento Las Marías produce tea bags for export to Europe.

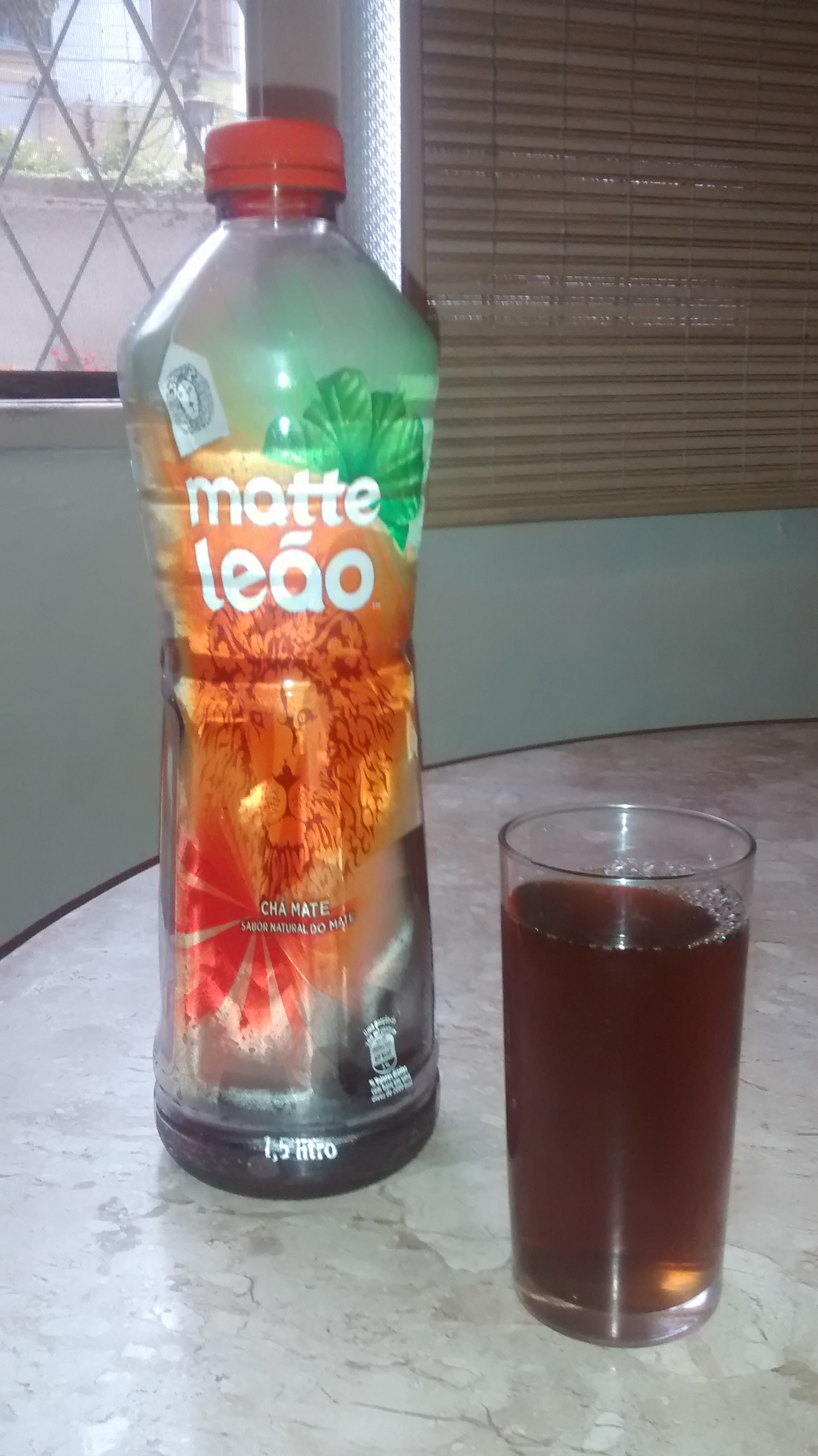
Industrially produced Matte Leão from Brazil

Travel narratives, such as Maria Graham's Journal of a Residence in Chile, show a long history of mate-drinking in central Chile. Many rural Chileans drink mate, in particular in the southern regions, particularly Magallanes, Aysén and Chiloé.

In Peru, mate is widespread throughout the north and south, first being introduced to Lima in the 17th century. It is widespread in rural zones, and it is prepared with coca (plant) or in a sweetened tea form with small slices of lemon or orange.

In some parts of Syria, Lebanon and other Eastern Mediterranean countries, drinking mate is also common. The custom came from Syrians and Lebanese who moved to South America during the late 19th and early parts of the 20th century, adopted the tradition, and kept it after returning to Western Asia. Syria is the biggest importer of yerba mate in the world, importing 15,000 tons a year. Mostly, the Druze communities in Syria and Lebanon maintain the culture and practice of mate.

According to a major retailer of mate in San Luis Obispo, California, by 2004, mate had grown to about 5% of the overall natural tea market in North America. Loose mate is commercially available in much of North America. Bottled mate is increasingly available in the United States. Canadian bottlers have introduced a cane sugar-sweetened, carbonated variety, similar to soda pop. One brand, Sol Mate, produces 10-US-fluid-ounce (300 ml) glass bottles available at Canadian and U.S. retailers, making use of the translingual pun (English 'soul mate'; Spanish/Portuguese 'sun mate') for the sake of marketing.

In some parts of the Southern Cone bitter mate is preferred, especially in Paraguay, Uruguay, the south of Brazil, and parts of Argentina and Bolivia. This is referred to in Brazil and a large part of Argentina as cimarrón –which also an archaic name for wild cattle, especially, to a horse that was very attached to a cowboy – which is understood as unsweetened mate. Many people are of the opinion that mate should be drunk in this form.

Unlike bitter mate, in every preparation of mate dulce, or sweet mate, sugar is incorporated according to the taste of the drinker. This form of preparation is very widespread in various regions of Argentina, like in the Santiago del Estero province, Córdoba, Cuyo, and the metropolitan region of Buenos Aires, among others. In Chile, this form of mate preparation is widespread in mostly rural zones. The spoonful of sugar or honey should fall on the edge of the cavity that the straw forms in the yerba, not all over the mate. One variation is to sweeten only the first mate preparation in order to cut the bitterness of the first sip, thus softening the rest. In Paraguay, a variant of mate dulce is prepared by first caramelizing refined sugar in a pot then adding milk. The mixture is heated and placed in a thermos and used in place of water. Often, chamomile (manzanilla, in Spanish) and coconut are added to yerba in the gumpa.

In the sweet version artificial sweeteners are also often added. As an alternative sweetener, natural ka'á he'é (Stevia rebaudiana) is preferred, which is an herb whose leaves are added in order to give a touch of sweetness. This is used principally in Paraguay.

The gourd in which bitter mate is drunk is not used to consume sweet mate due to the idea that the taste of the sugar would be detrimental to its later use to prepare and drink bitter mate, as it is said that it ruins the flavor of the mate.

Materva is a sweet, carbonated soft drink based on yerba mate. Developed in Cuba in 1920, and produced since the 1960s in Miami, Florida, it is a staple of the Cuban culture in Miami.

== See also ==
- Black drink
- Mate con malicia (Chilean beverage)
- Ilex guayusa (caffeinated beverage made from another holly tree)
- List of Brazilian dishes
- Mate de coca
- Club-Mate
- Materva
- Guayakí
- Yaupon

== Bibliography ==
- Assunção, Fernando O. (1967). El mate. Bolsilibros Arca (in Spanish).
- Claude Lévi-Strauss (1955). Tristes Tropiques (1973 English translation by John and Doreen Weightman) New York: Atheneum.
- Sarreal, Julia J.S. (2022). Yerba Mate: the Drink that Shaped a Nation. Oakland, California: University of California Press. ISBN 978-0-520-37927-5.
