= Mate cocido =

South American beverage

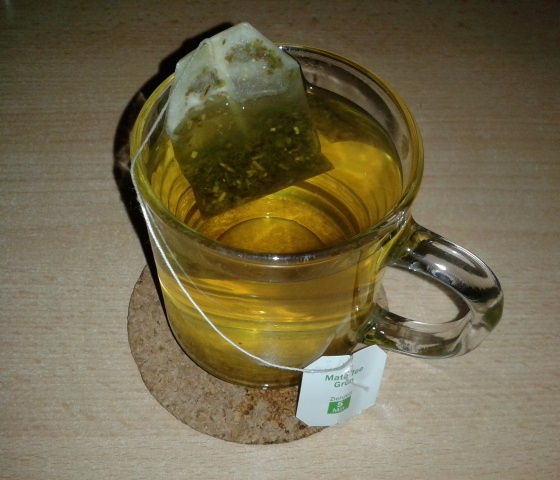
- Type: Hot or cold beverage
- Introduced: 17th century

Mate cocido (Spanish pronunciation: [ˈmate koˈsiðo], 'boiled maté', or just cocido in Paraguay and in the Corrientes Province), chá mate (Brazilian Portuguese: [ˈʃa ˈmatʃi], 'maté tea'), kojói (Guarani pronunciation: [koˈɟoi]), or yerbiado (Cuyo, Argentina) is an infusion typical of Southern Cone cuisine (mostly consumed in Southern Brazil, the Bolivian Chaco, Paraguay, Argentina and Uruguay). It is traditionally prepared by boiling yerba mate in water, then strained and served in cups. It is a bitter tasting beverage, similar to mate but milder, with the same stimulating and nutritional properties. It is also sold in teabags, so it can be prepared like tea.

== History ==
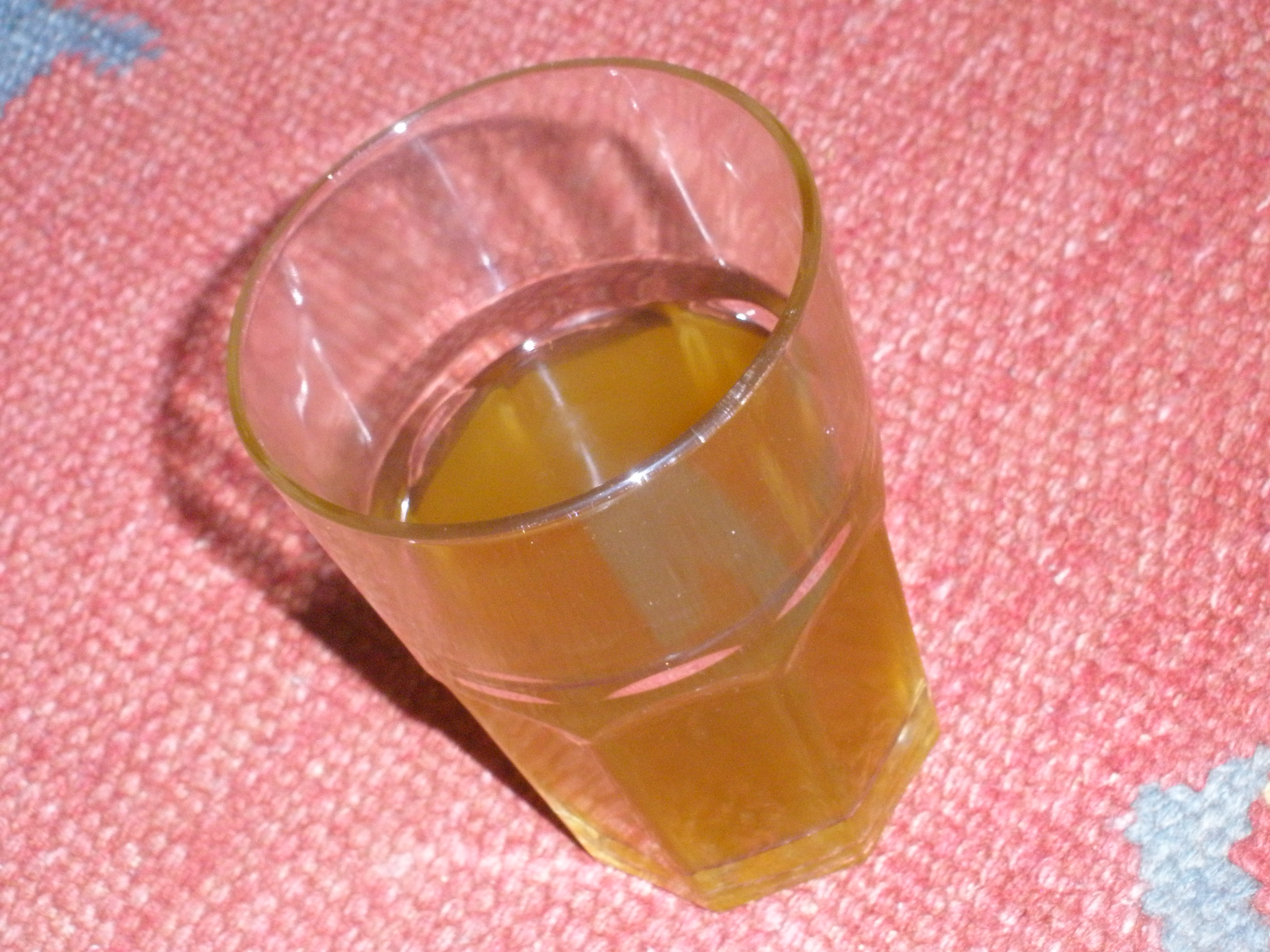
Iced mate cocido, similar to iced tea

The Jesuits in the current territories of the south of Brazil and Paraguay, and the Argentine provinces of Misiones and Corrientes, in the first decades of the 17th century improved the cultivation technique of yerba mate and exported it. Spain, to compete with the tea that England sold, put a chopped yerba mate on sale to make tea that became popular in Europe, known as the "Tea of the Jesuits".

That "Tea of the Jesuits" from the 17th century, today has become the mate cocido, a very popular infusion that, because of the low price of yerba mate compared to the price of tea or coffee, has become since the early 20th century the common beverage in schools, hospitals and prisons.

== Preparation ==
The preparation of mate cocido in tea bags is almost the same as regular yerba mate, with the difference that in grinding the dust and sticks are removed, sorting and processing only the leaves. Mate cocido is also produced in soluble form.

== Varieties ==
- Traditional: made from yerba mate, sometimes consumed with milk and sweetened.
- Flavored: mate cocido to which an additional flavor has been applied. Some flavors are lemon, peach, vanilla, orange and tangerine.
- Iced mate cocido: also called 'cold mate cocido'. It is a highly refreshing drink, the traditional or flavored mate cocido served cold, usually adding ice and lemon juice.

== See also ==
- List of hot beverages
