= Bombilla =

Filtered straw for drinking mate tea

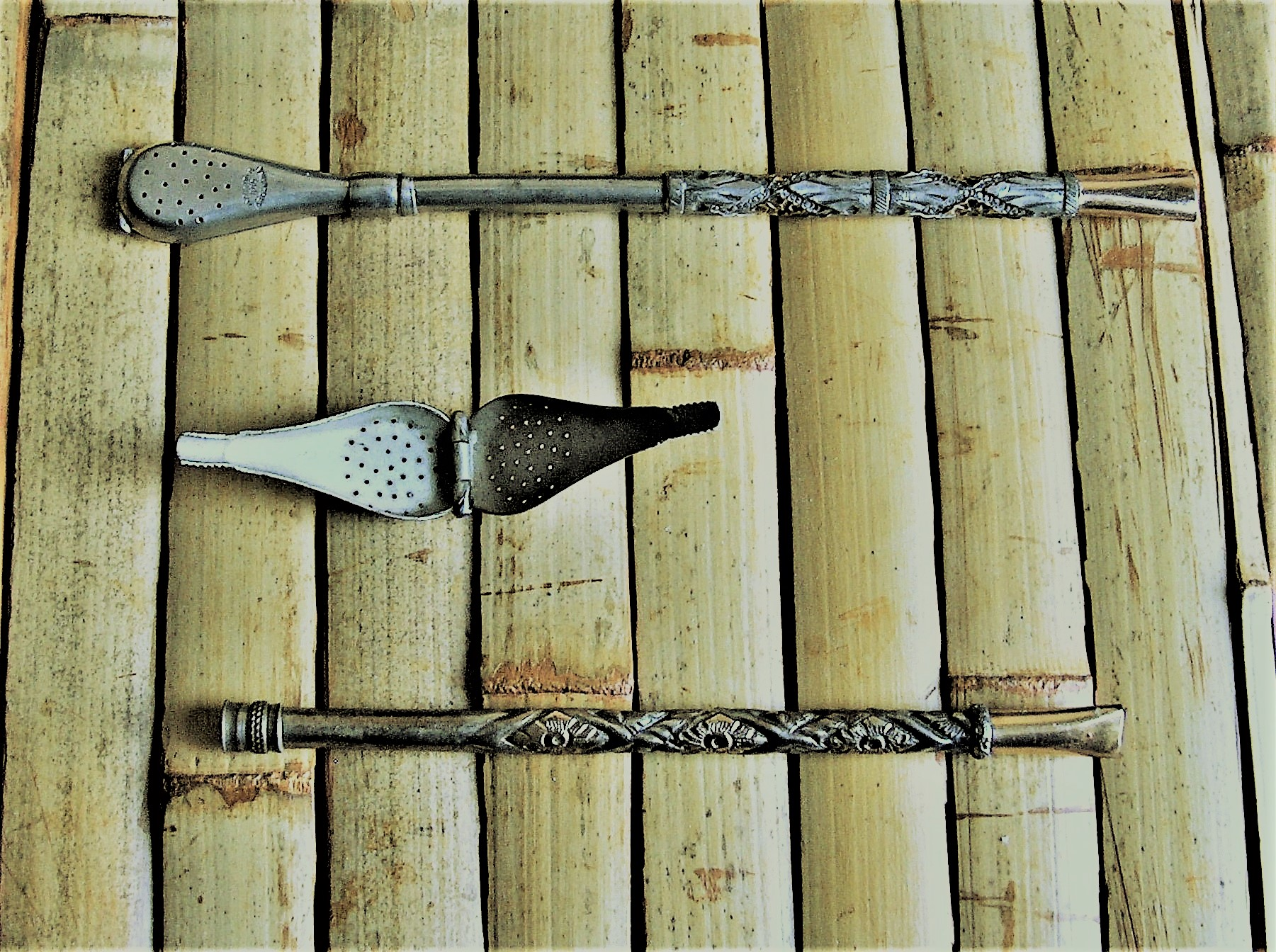
Two stamped 800 silver bombillas with gold plated heads and removable filters. The filter in the middle of the picture is detached from the bombilla tube at the bottom of the picture and is shown in the open position which is used for cleaning the filter. Once the filter is folded, the two semicircular filter threads form a circular threaded neck allowing the filter to screw into the tube. The bombilla tubes are decorated.

A bombilla (Spanish), bomba (Portuguese) or massasa (Arabic) is a type of drinking straw, used to drink mate. In metal bombillas, the lower end is perforated and acts as a metal filter which is used to separate the mate infusion from leaves, stems, and other mate debris, and functions in a similar fashion to the perforated metal screen of a teapot. Filters can be removable and can be opened for cleaning, or they may be permanently fixed to the bombilla stem. Bombillas vary in length but a popular length is approximately 7 inches (18 cm) long.

Traditional bombillas are made of metal alloys such as an alloy of copper and nickel called alpaca silver or German silver, stainless steel, and 800 silver which is used to construct the filter and stem, sometimes combined with a gold plated head. Low-end bombillas are made from hollow-stemmed cane. Silver bombillas are popular. In recent times, the traditional silver bombillas are being replaced by ones made from stainless steel.

Silver bombillas were used by the privileged classes, while those made of straw were used by people of lesser means. Due to the high thermal conductivity of silver, bombillas and gourds made of silver can get very hot fast, requiring caution when drinking hot mate tea to avoid burns.

== Filter varieties ==
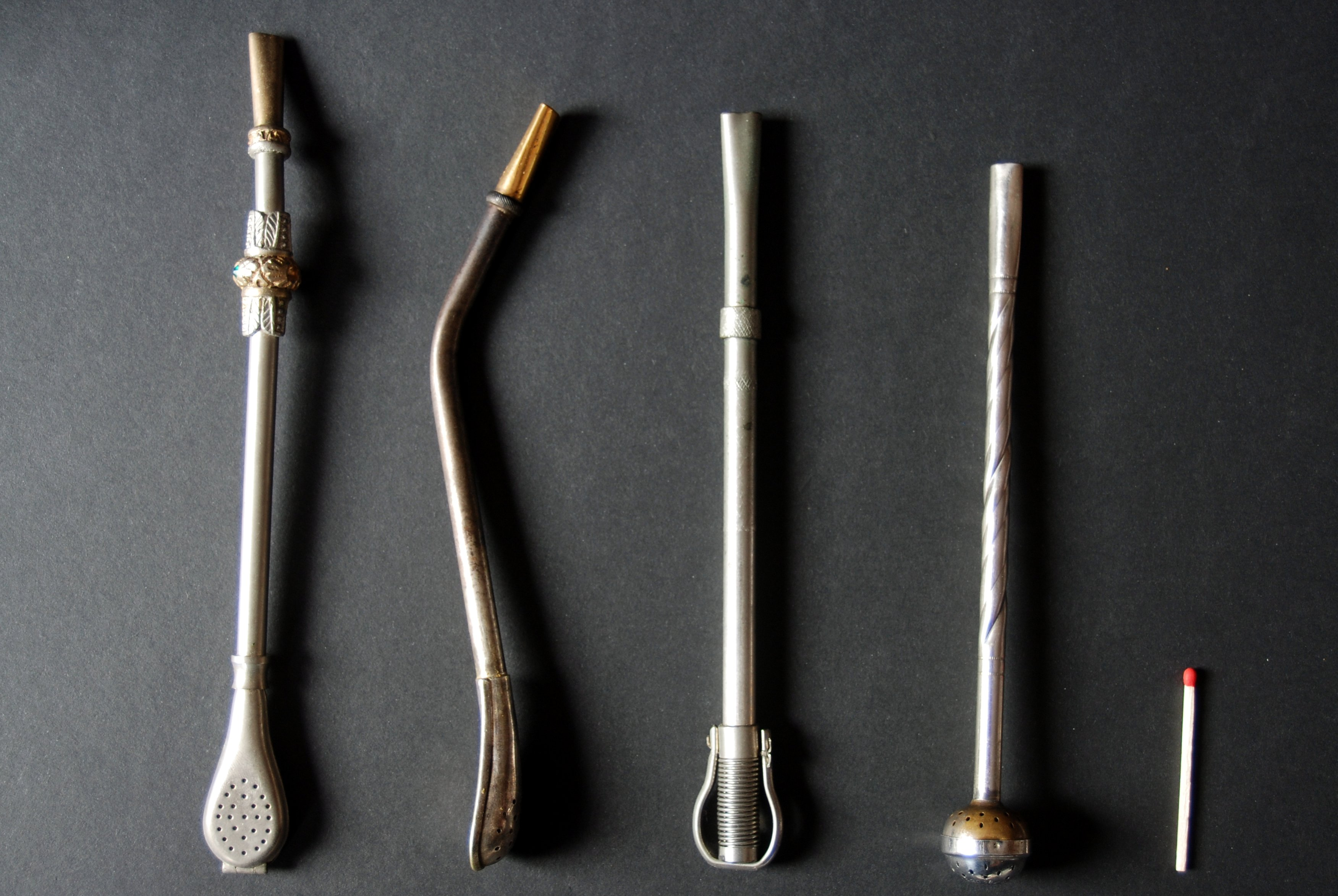
Four different bombillas used for drinking mate, with a matchstick for size comparison. The two leftmost bombillas have a spoon filter, while the rightmost two have a spring filter and ball filter, respectively.

Different bombillas vary in terms of the shape of their filter. Different names for these shapes include the spoon filter, coil filter, spring filter, ball filter, and pick filter.

== Etymology ==
The Spanish name "Bombilla" means literally "little pump". The Spanish term is also used for electric lightbulbs, bombilla eléctrica, being a diminutive of bomba. In Chilean Spanish, bombilla can refer to all types of straws, but in Rioplatense Spanish, it only refers to the variety used to drink mate.

== Gallery ==
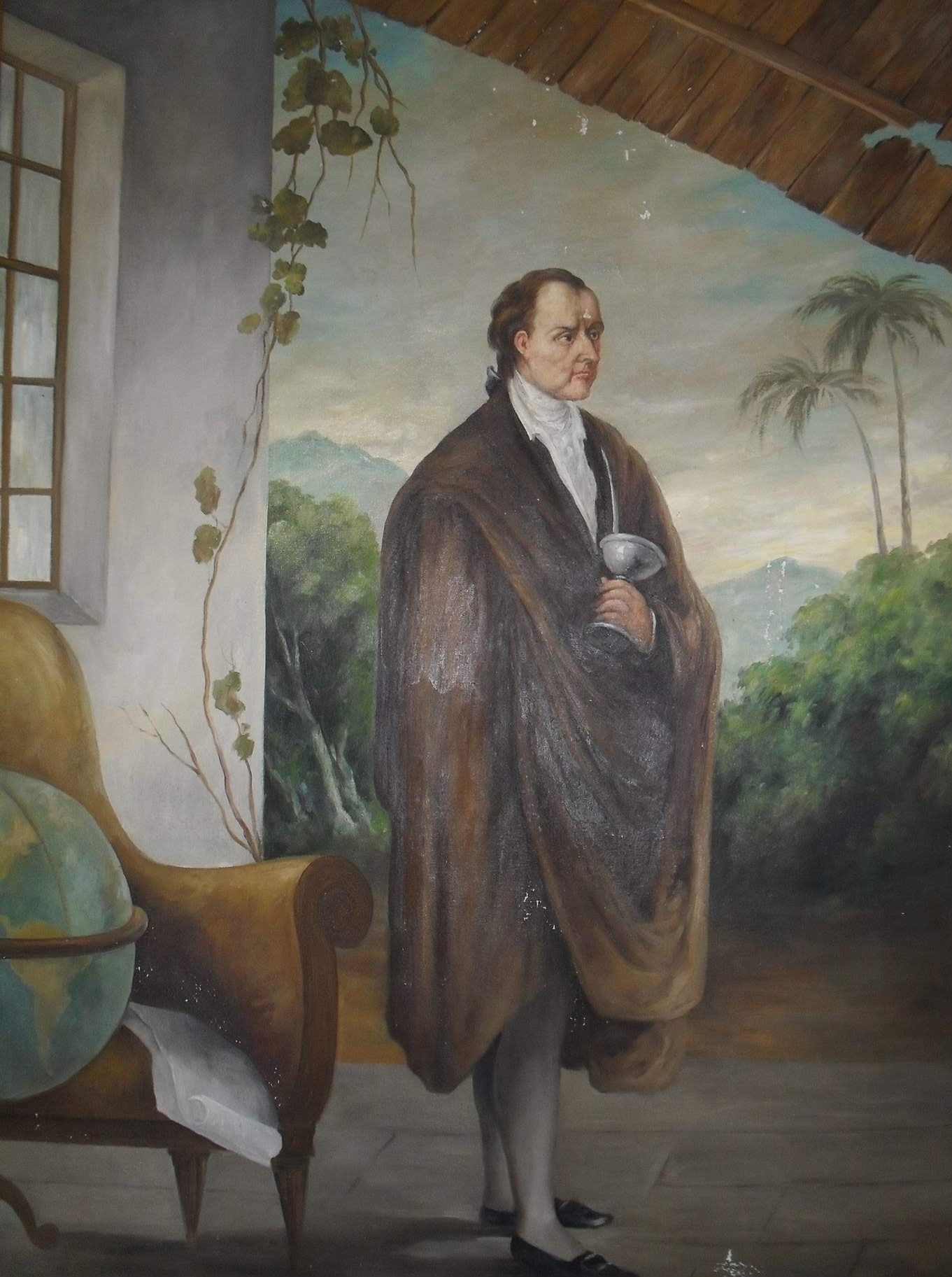
José Gaspar Rodríguez de Francia, a 19th-century consul and dictator of Paraguay, with a mate gourd and its respective bombilla

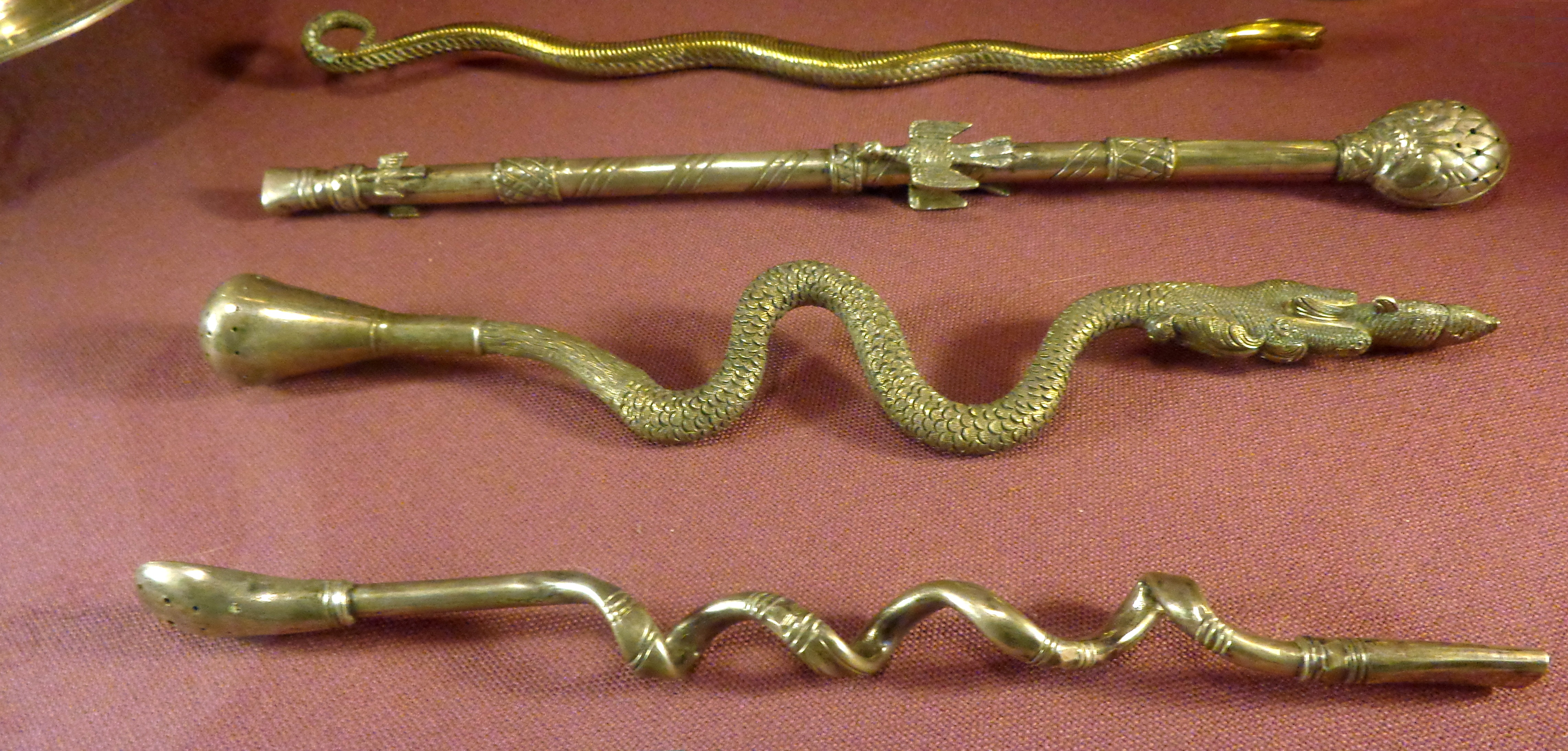
Silver Bombillas ca. 1840 at the Museo Histórico Cornelio de Saavedra, Buenos Aires, Argentina

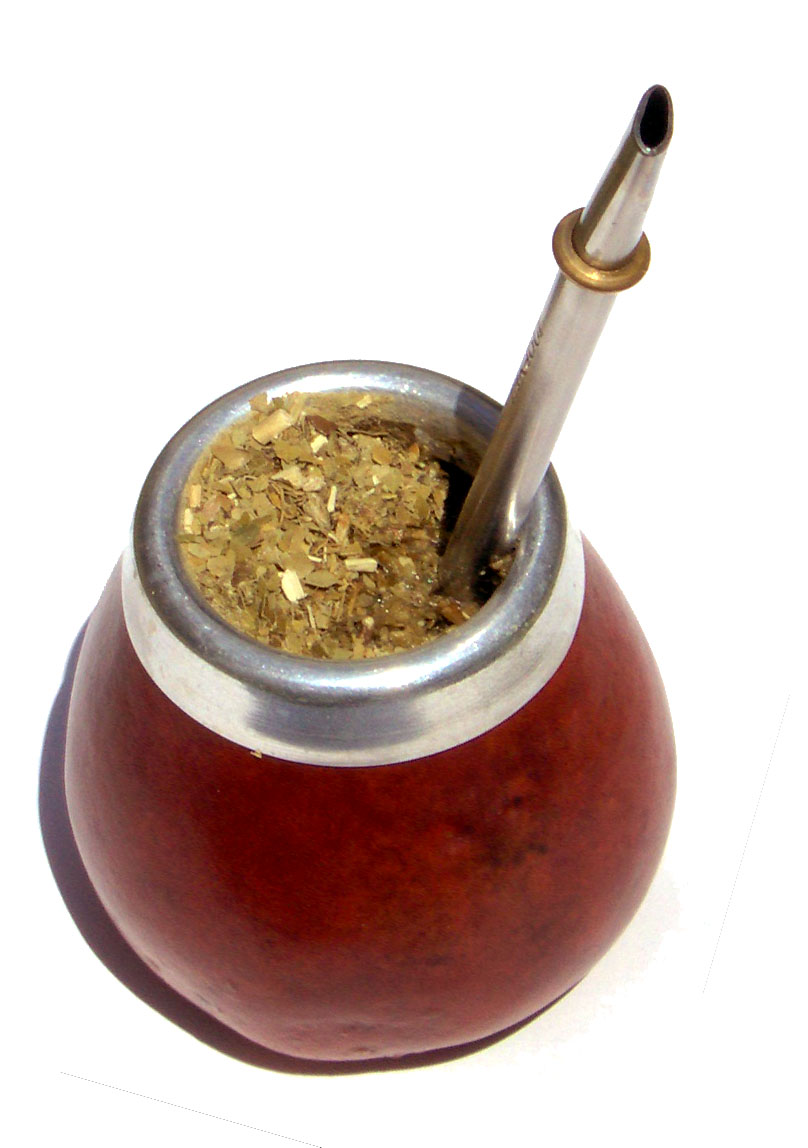
Bombilla in a gourd with mate
