= Capioví =

- Village and municipality
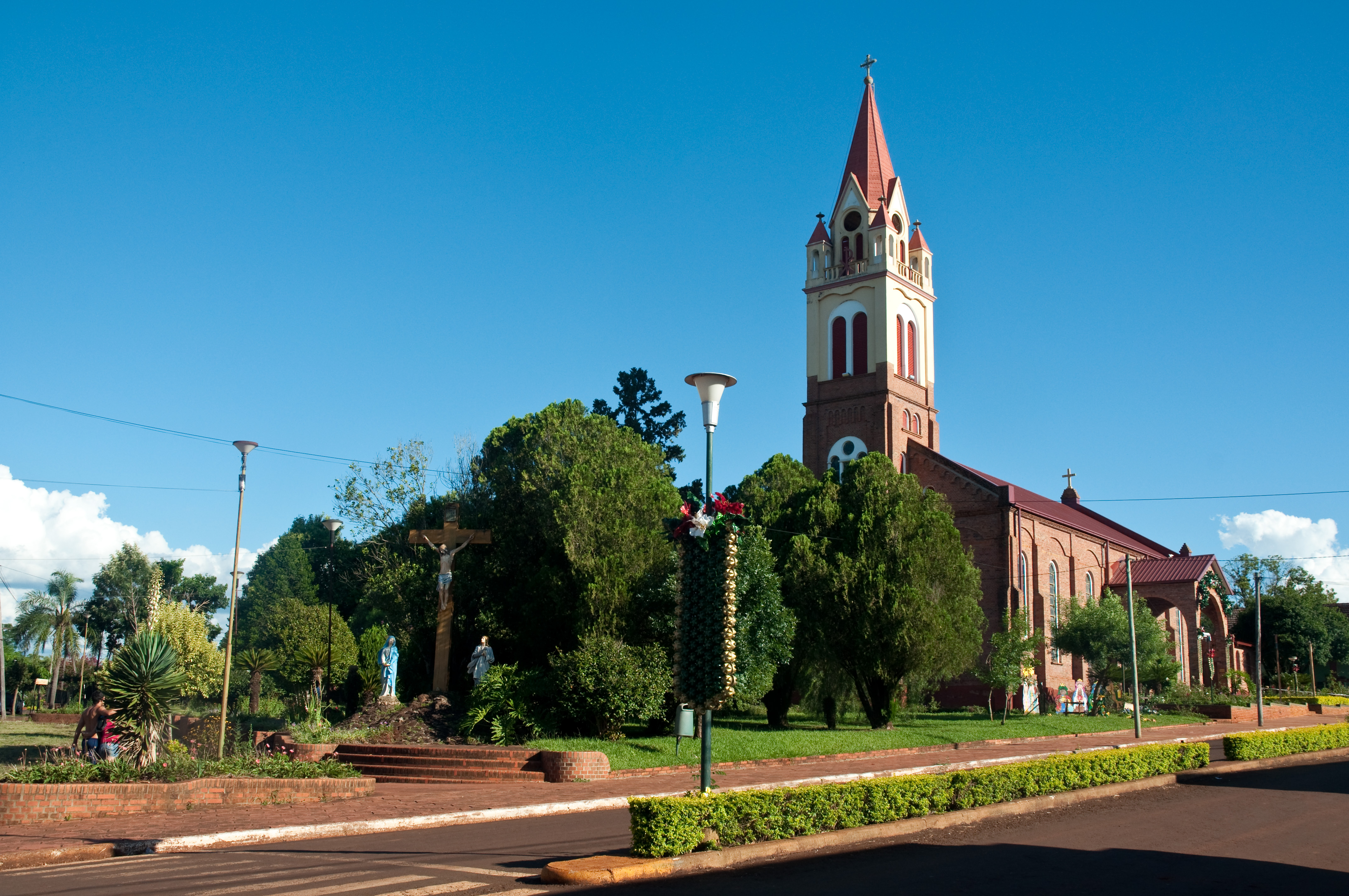
- The San Luis Gonzaga Church

- Location in Argentina Capioví (Argentina)
- Coordinates: 26°55′50″S 55°03′33″W
- Country: Argentina
- Province: Misiones Province
- Department: Libertador General San Martín
- founded: 1920

Government
  - Intendant: Ramón Alberto Arrúa

Area
  - Land: 42 sq mi (108 km^{2})
- Elevation: 561 ft (171 m)

Population (2001)
  - Total: 3,335
- Time zone: UTC−3 (ART)
- Postal code: 3332
- Website: capiovi.com

Capioví is a village and municipality in Misiones Province in north-eastern Argentina.

Land was first acquired in the area by the Carlos Culmey Company, in 1919, and the following year, Enrique Graef and his family became the future town's first settlers. Named for the Capioví Falls, upstream, the village grew following Culmey's installation of a sawmill. The cultivation of yerba maté was followed by the 1971 opening of a Papel Misionero paper mill.

Capioví at Christmas time: The town is decorated with Christmas decorations handmade from recycled plastic bottles. A lot of the inhabitants get together all year round to make these crafts which are put up in December for visitors to admire. Capioví has become the state Christmas capital.
