= San Pedro Department, Misiones =

Coordinates: 26°38′S 54°07′W

San Pedro Departamento San Pedro
- Department
- Interactive map of San Pedro
- Country: Argentina

Area
  - Total: 3,407 km^{2} (1,315 sq mi)

Population (2022)
  - Total: 34,801
  - Density: 10.21/km^{2} (26.46/sq mi)

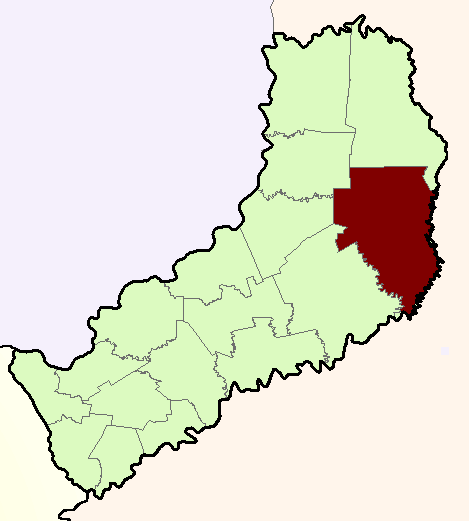

San Pedro Department is the largest and most sparsely populated department in the Misiones Province, Argentina. It covers an area of 3407 square kilometres and has a population of 24,000 people. San Pedro includes part of the Paraná River watershed, part of the Uruguay River watershed, and the Sierra Central that divides these two systems.

== The Capital ==
The capital of San Pedro Department is the town of San Pedro. It is situated in the Sierra Central, at 26°38'S 54°07'W, 575 m a.s.l. The town is characterized by native Parana Pines or Kuri'y (Araucaria angustifolia) scattered amongst the houses and small businesses.

== Origins ==
The original inhabitants of San Pedro were the indigenous Kaingangues, not to be confused with the Mbya Guarani on the coast of the Paraná River. The Kaingangues lived by hunting, gathering, and planting crops in small clearings in the forest. They had a reputation as fearsome warriors, which kept Europeans out of central Misiones until the late 19th century.

Despite this fear, in 1840, a shortage of yerba mate(and resulting high prices) inspired an expedition to central Misiones. Yerba mate is a native plant used in infusions, and harvested, at that time, from the Atlantic forest, where it grew wild.

Under the leadership of their chief, Fracran, the Kaingangues massacred the expedition members. The only survivor of the expedition was a young boy, Bonifacio Maidana, who was adopted by an influential member of the Kaingangues.

Over the next decades, Europeans kept away from central Misiones and the Kaingangues. Maidana grew up and gained power in the Kaingangue community. Finally, he disputed Fracran's leadership. Fracran escaped to Brazil, and Maidana replaced him as chief.

From that time on, the Kaingangues began seeking peace with the European colonists in the south, and finally, in 1876, Maidana signed the "pacto de la selva" or "treaty of the forest", permitting Europeans to harvest yerba mate in the area that today is San Pedro. The Treaty however failed to work and a War of extermination occurred. Many Kaingangues were killed.

The village of San Pedro was established. Some Kaingangues settled there; others left for Brazil.

== Industry ==
San Pedro's industry, until recently, was based almost entirely on harvesting natural resources: first wild yerba mate, and later kuri'y or Parana Pine. Around 1983, the public land around the capital was colonized by small-holder farmers. Now, the economy is based mostly on wood and tobacco.

== Population ==
Today, most people in San Pedro have subsistence farms or work in forestry. San Pedro has the highest rate of poverty among Misiones' departments: 40% of people do not have their basic needs satisfied. Outside the town of San Pedro, only 15% of farmers own their own land.

== Natural Heritage ==
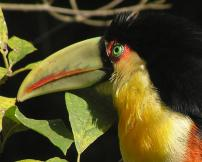

San Pedro's native vegetation is Atlantic forest or Mata Atlantica, one of the world's most diverse and endangered ecosystems (Myers et al. 2000). In San Pedro, much of the remaining forest is protected in five provincial parks and the UNESCO Yaboti Biosphere Reserve. Cruce Caballero Provincial Park, just 6 square kilometres, protects some of the last remaining primary forest in Misiones.

San Pedro is famous for its Parana Pine (Araucaria angustifolia) forest, protected in Cruce Caballero and Araucaria Provincial Parks. Threatened animal species associated with this forest include the Araucaria Tit-Spinetail (Leptasthenura setaria), the Brown Howling Monkey (Alouatta guariba), and the Vinaceous Amazon (Amazona vinacea).
