= Establecimiento Las Marías =

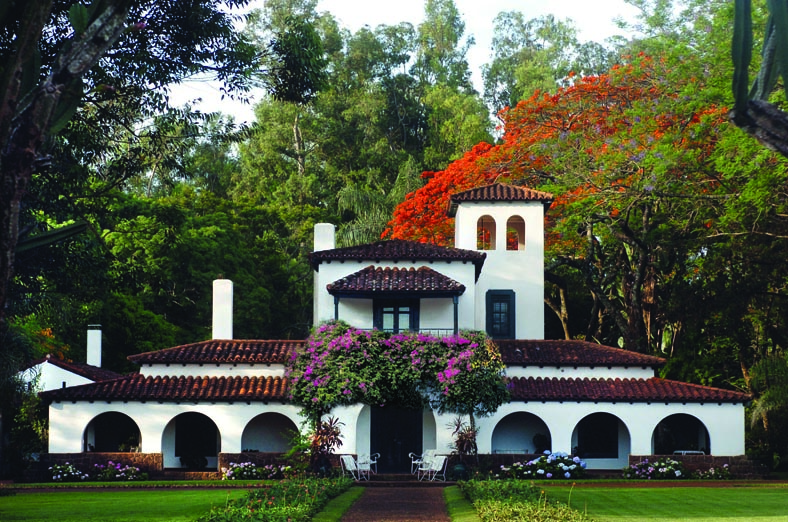
Estancia Las Marias

Establecimiento Las Marías is a renowned company specializing in the production and packaging of infusions, particularly tea and yerba mate. For over 100 years, Las Marías has been a trusted source for products such as Taragüi, Unión, La Merced, and Mañanita.

== History ==
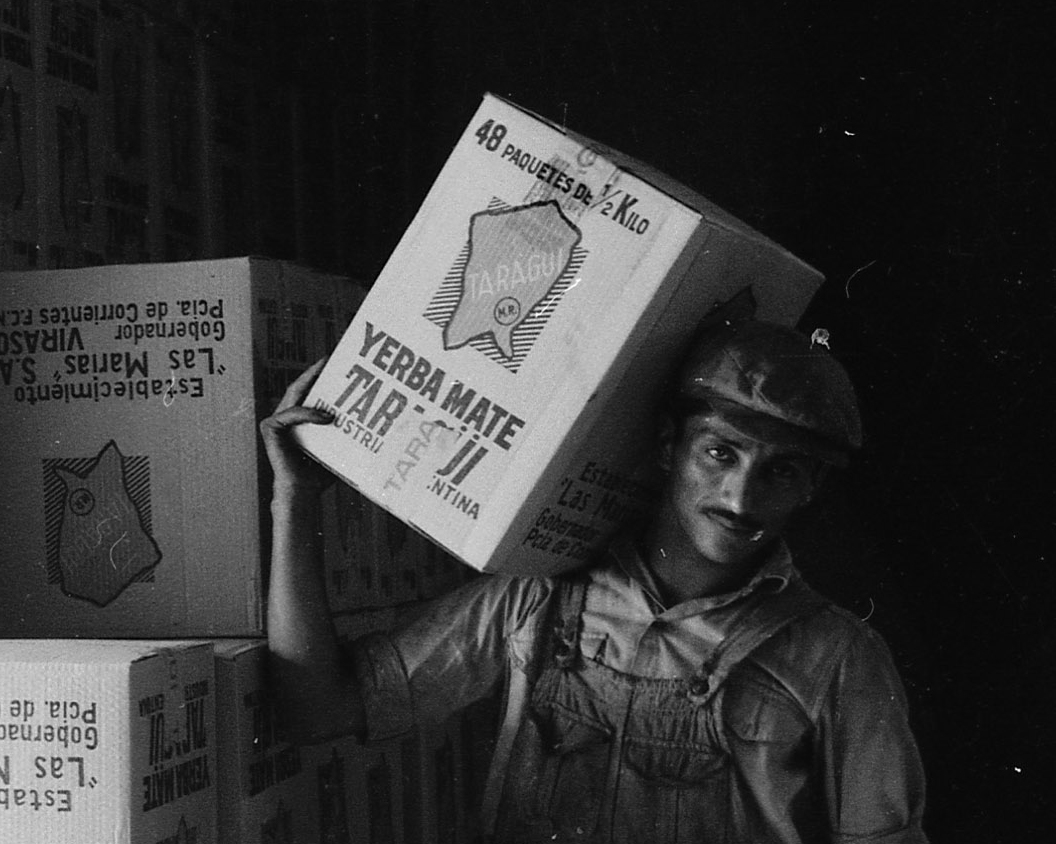
Yerba mate worker

The Navajas family, which owns Las Marías, started the mate operation in 1924 on their cattle estancia with 38 hectares of planted mate. The raw material was and, largely still is, produced by small holders and subsequently bought by processors and packers.

Production at Establecimiento Las Marías is completely vertically integrated, starting with either seedbeds or cuttings from the most productive trees. Raw material is also sourced from vetted growers who are constantly monitored by company technicians both at the farm and at the buying stations. Some highlights of innovation are the development of instant mate in 1964, packing mate in tea bags in 1966, development of high density planting in 1973 and mechanical harvesting in 1981. Product development has continued with the market segmentation created by ‘Union’ the first light flavored mate in 1982, with Taragüi Mate Listo in 1992, which is mate-to-go in a disposable container, needing only water, with a low caffeine product called "Relax", which has a percentage of Ilex Dumosa, a variety with no caffeine which was made commercially viable by Las Marías agricultural engineers, and “Bio” (Unión Bio) the first yerba mate with natural prebiotics.

== Argentine market ==
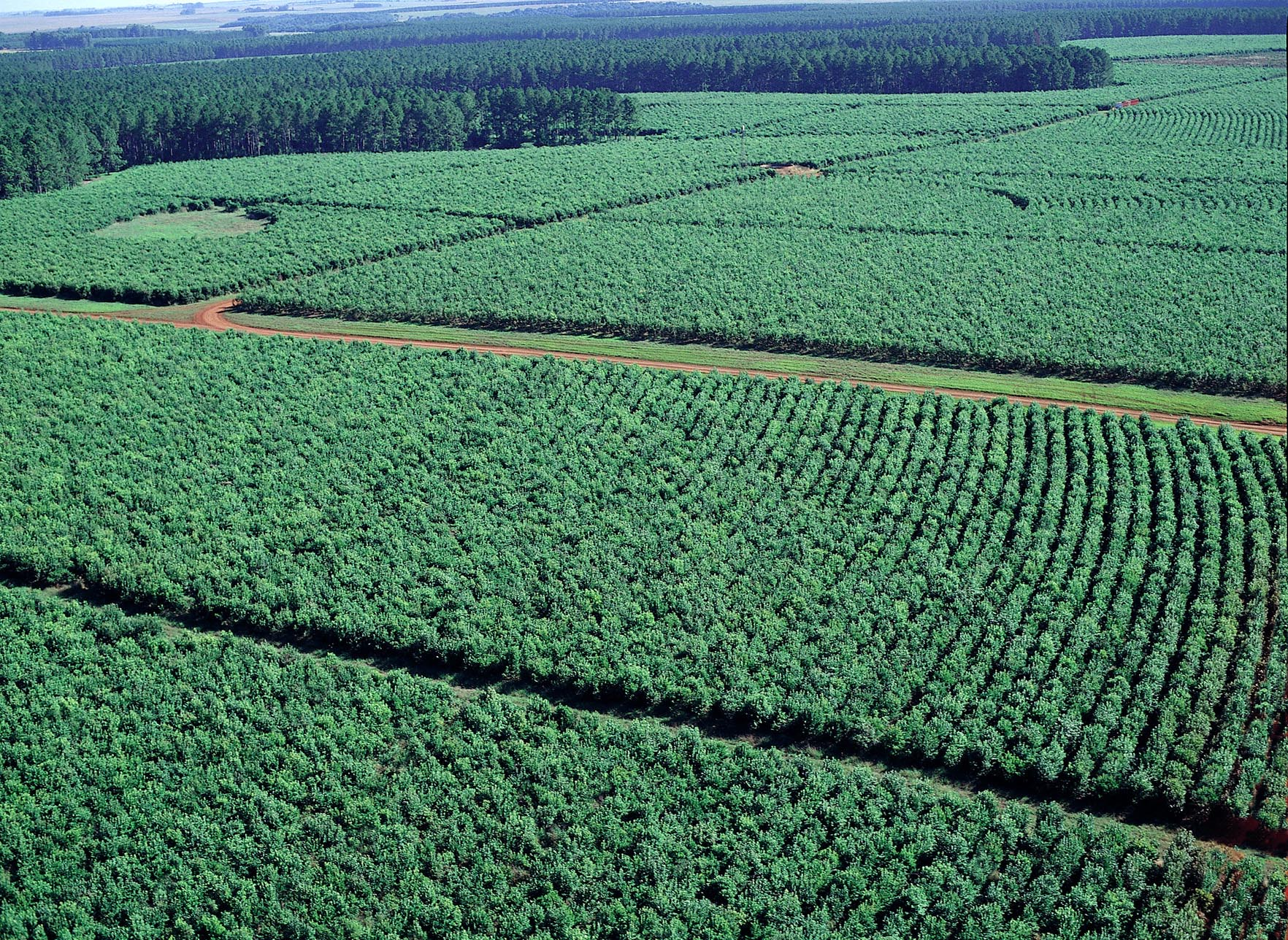
Argentina yerba mate

Argentina has adopted the quintessential local Native American beverage, and means of drinking it, and made it the national beverage of choice. After tap water, mate is the most widely consumed beverage in Argentina.

Mate was discovered by the Guaraní aborigines and industrialized by the Jesuits in the 16th and 17th centuries.

In Argentina, there are more than 200 brands in the market, many very local. There are approximately 10 companies with some national presence, accounting for 80% of the market. The market leader is Las Marias, with slightly more than 30% of the Argentine mate market. Taragüi is the leading brand of Las Marías.

== Exports from Argentina ==
Of the 310,000 tons produced, 40,000 tons are exported, both in bulk and packed. With a 45% market share, Las Marias is the leader of the packed (branded) segment, which is 7,000 tons. Las Marias has taken the strategic decision to only sell branded products, either domestically or for export. Other companies exporting packed mate are Don Basilio and La Chacchuera. Many companies export bulk mate primarily, to Chile, Paraguay and Uruguay but also to Syria and Lebanon. North America, Europe and parts of Asia are growing markets for both forms of exports. Bulk mate is used both as the raw material for brands and as an ingredient in other products, such as energy drinks. The Middle East, accounting for roughly 60% of exports, is such a major market because there was a reverse migration in the 1950s. Those who returned had been in Argentina for several generations and had therefore picked up the local habits, such as drinking mate in the traditional way. New markets are being developed in Europe and in North America. Most of the new markets are teabag ones, but Poland is an exception. There, traditional mate is a seen as quick and easy adventurous experience, perhaps similar to smoking a hookah, which also has an inherent social component.

== See also ==
- Yerba mate
- Taragüi
