= Stress in Spanish =

Linguistic feature

Stress in Spanish is functional: to change the placement of stress changes the meaning of a sentence or phrase: for example, célebre ('famous'), celebre ('[that] he/she celebrates'), and celebré ('I celebrated') contrast only by stress. There is some minor variance among Spanish dialects; a speaker of Rioplatense Spanish will pronounce boina ('beret') as [ˈbojna], but a speaker of Colombian Spanish will pronounce it as [boˈina] and spell it as boína.

== Transcription ==
Spanish has only two degrees of stress. In traditional transcription, primary stress is marked with an acute accent (´) over the vowel. The undertie (‿) may be used between words to emphasize the liaison of syllables in Spanish vocal music. Unstressed parts of a word are left unmarked.

== Position ==
The primary stress of a Spanish word usually occurs in one of three positions: on the final syllable (oxytone, e.g. señor, ciudad), on the penultimate syllable (paroxytone, e.g. señora, nosotros), or on the antepenultimate syllable (proparoxytone, e.g. teléfono, sábado), but in very rare cases, it can come on the fourth- or even fifth-last syllable in compound words (see below). Vowel-final words and those ending in -s or -n are usually stressed on the penultimate syllable, with this stress applying to around 80% of Spanish vocabulary.

There are almost no Spanish words with antepenultimate stress that have a complex syllable rime in the penult. For example, made-up words such as teléfosno, teléfiono and átasca are considered ill-formed by native speakers. There are a few exceptions, such as the anglicisms Wáshington and Mánchester, and the town of Frómista in Spain.

The trilled /r/, the palatal nasal /ɲ/, and the palatal lateral /ʎ/ are similarly excluded from the final syllable of proparoxytones. Thus chinchorro 'trawling net' is allowed, but the made-up chínchorro can be considered ill-formed. That said, Spanish does have some words containing antepenultimate stress and trills in the final syllable onset, which are typically of onomatopoeic, Basque, or unknown origin: cháncharras-máncharras 'pretexts' (onomatopoeic), Chávarri (a last name of Basque origin), tábarro 'type of wasp'.

In addition, words that end in a falling diphthong almost always have final stress: carey 'tortoise' is allowed but made-up cárey isn't. Some loanwords make an exception: póney, yérsey, yóquey.

In addition, some of Chilean Spanish's voseo verb forms end in falling diphthongs but are stressed on the penultimate syllable. For example, bailábai 'you were dancing' ends on an unstressed falling diphthong.

== Creating contrasts ==
All Spanish words have at least one stressed syllable when the words are used in isolation. The word para [ˈpaɾa] can be a verb (the singular pronoun form of "stop") or a preposition (in order to, for). When words are used in a phrase, the stress may be dropped depending on the part of speech. Para el coche can mean "stop the car" if the stress remains. If the stress is removed, it means "for the car". Some pairs of stressed and unstressed words are distinguished in writing by using a differential accent: sí 'yes' (stressed) — si 'if' (unstressed if used in a phrase).

In English, contrasts are made by reducing vowels, changing the loudness of the word, or changing the intonation of the phrase. For example, this is her car emphasizes the owner of the car. If the stress is changed to say this is her car, the emphasis is on showing what object belongs to a specific person. In Spanish, stress is almost always changed by reordering the words. Using the same example, este coche es suyo emphasises the owner, and éste es su coche emphasises the object.

== Word stress categories ==
All Spanish words can be classified into one of four groups based on the position of their stress. If the last syllable is stressed it falls into the aguda category. Aguda words generally end in a consonant other than n or s or are a conjugated verb that ends in an accented, stressed vowel. If the stress falls on the second-last syllable, it is classified as a llana or grave. Llanas typically are words that end in n, s, or a vowel. Any exceptions have a written accent. Words with the stress placed on the third-last are categorized as esdrújulas, and those with stress on the fourth- or fifth-last syllable are called sobresdrújulas. In either of the last two categories, the stressed syllable must be accented to break the rules of the first two categories. A "singular" Spanish word is never a sobresdrújula; this kind of stress occurs only in verbs with more than one pronominal suffix, such as diciéndonosla (diciendo + nos + la; "telling it to us") or llévesemelo (lleve + se + me + lo; "take it with you for me").

While certain adverbs ending in -mente have accent marks before the third syllable, they are not considered sobresdrújula. Instead, adverbs in -mente are considered to have two stressed syllables, one in -mente and the other in the adjectival root. For example, lentamente 'slowly' is pronounced [ˈlentaˈmente].
