= Champagne cola =

Puerto Rican carbonated beverage

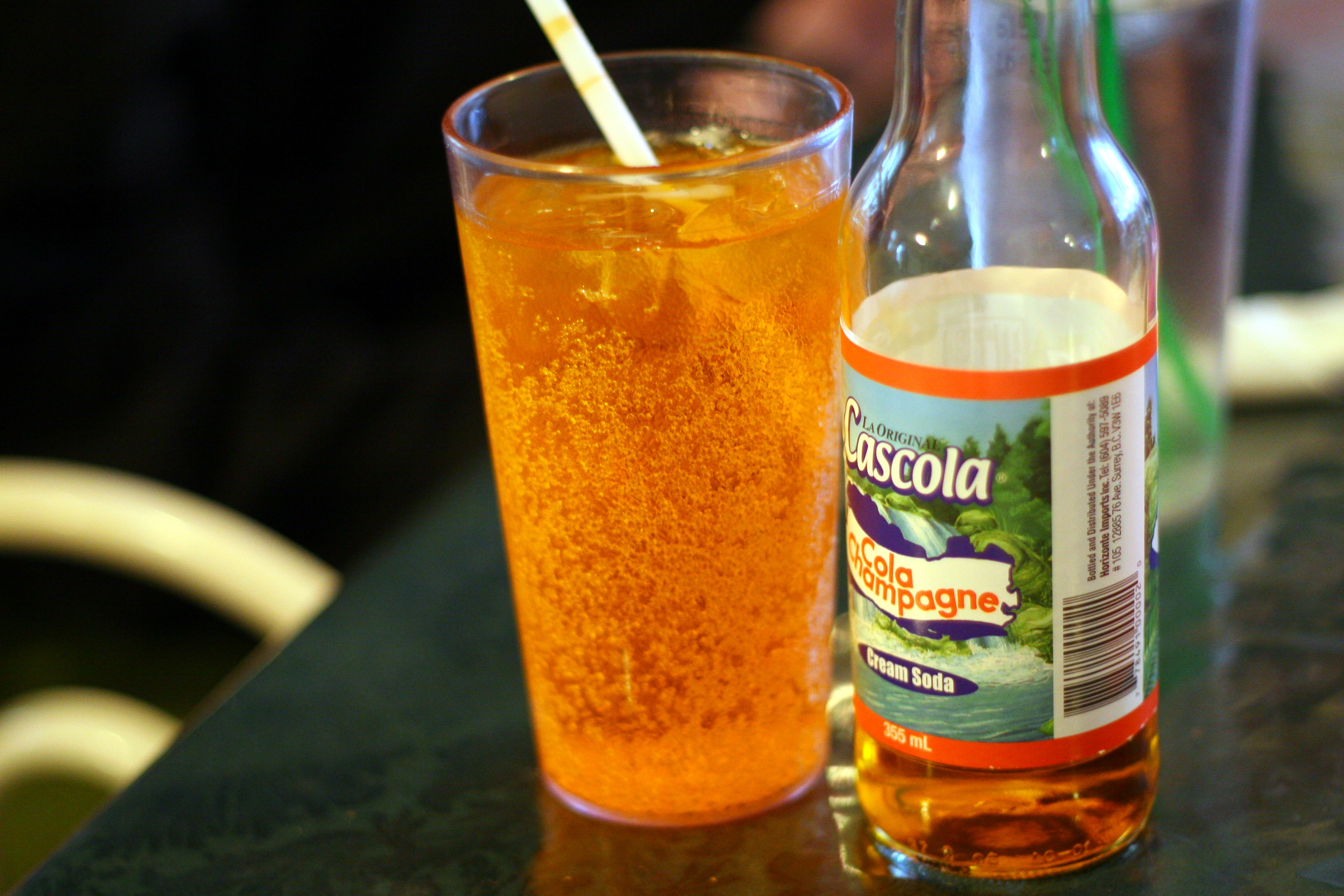
Cola champagne

Champagne cola, Kola Champagne, or Champagne soda is a sweetened carbonated beverage produced mainly in the tropics of Latin America, former British West Indies, and Pakistan. Kola Champagne was invented in Puerto Rico by Ángel Rivero Méndez. Rivero Méndez was a Captain in the Spanish Army during the Spanish–American War. In 1902, a few years after the end of the Spanish-American War, Rivero Méndez founded El Polo Norte Fábrica de Sodas (the North Pole Soda Factory) where he created the Kola Champagne, which became, and still is, a popular soft drink in Puerto Rico. While elaborating the drink he worked on his book, Chronicle of the Spanish-American War in Puerto Rico.

It is typically dark yellow to light brown in color, with a flavor comparable to bubblegum or cream soda, with no connection to cola. Like Champagne wine, it is carbonated, typically with a yellow color, and in many countries, "cola" is used as a general term for all soft drinks, granting it the name of "Champagne cola". Similar products include the Peruvian Inca Kola and the Scottish Irn Bru.

== Brands ==
=== Americas ===
==== Caribbean ====
In the Bahamas, Champagne sodas are produced by Caribbean Bottling Company Bahamas Ltd.

In Haiti there are several Champagne type colas. Cola Couronne fruit champagne soda from the Brasserie de la Couronne. Brooklyn Bottling Group makes Cola Lacaye in fruit Champagne, banana, and fruit flavors. Fiesta is made in citrus, grape and cola Champagne by Tropic SA. King Cola by BRANA also makes a cola Champagne beverage.

In Jamaica, Kola Champagne is produced by brewer & beverage producer, D&G (Desnoes & Geddes). D&G also produces the well known Red Stripe beer, Jamaican ginger beer, Malta, and local Smirnoff Ice, Guinness, and Heineken.

In Puerto Rico, Kola Champagne is produced by Santurce Soda Water, Inc. (Santurce Kola Champagne), and by Refrescos de Puerto Rico (OK Kola Champagne).

In Trinidad and Tobago, Kola Champagne and diet Kola Champagne are produced in the Cole Cold soft drink line produced by S. M. Jaleel and Company.

In the French Caribbean territories, including Martinique, Guadeloupe, Saint-Martin, and French Guiana, Cola Champagne by Royal Soda is an iconic beverage introduced in 1950. However, due to French regulations requiring strict transparency regarding food composition and as the beverage did not contain kola nut, Royal Soda was required to remove the term "Cola" from its name. Additionally, the protection of the Champagne designation of origin further necessitated a name change. As a result, Cola Champagne was renamed Kampane, while retaining its original recipe. Despite these modifications, the beverage remains popular and continues to be an integral part of the cultural identity of the French Caribbean territories.

==== South America ====
In Brazil, AmBev produces Guaraná Antarctica, a guaraná based Champagne soda. It was branded as "Guaraná Champagne" until the early 90's.

In Colombia, Colombiana produces a Champagne soda as well as Gaseosas la Cigarra in Nariño, Colombia. Kola Román is also Colombian; invented in the city of Cartagena, Colombia in 1865 by Don Carlos Román.

==== North America ====
In Canada, Grace Island Soda makes a Kola Champagne soda in a glass bottle, as does Cool Runnings Soda. In Saguenay Lac-Saint-Jean, Quebec, a Red Champagne soft drink is produced.

In El Salvador, La Cascada Kolashampan is produced by Panamerican. Kolashampan was made in the city of San Salvador, El Salvador in the 20th century.

In the mainland U.S., Goya Foods Inc. of Jersey City, NJ distributes ‘Cola Champagne’ under its brand name. Good-O Beverage Company in the Bronx, NY produces “Kola Champagne Soda” in regular, diet, and “golden” varieties. Cawy Bottling Company in Miami, Florida, produced Quinabeer.

=== Elsewhere ===
In Norway, Villa Champagnebrus (mixed fruits, formerly known as Villa Farris) is a champagne soda.

In Pakistan, Kooler Saudi Champagne soda is offered.

In United Kingdom, KA Karibbean Kola made by A.G. Barr.

== See also ==
- List of soft drinks by country
