= Agriculture in Paraguay =

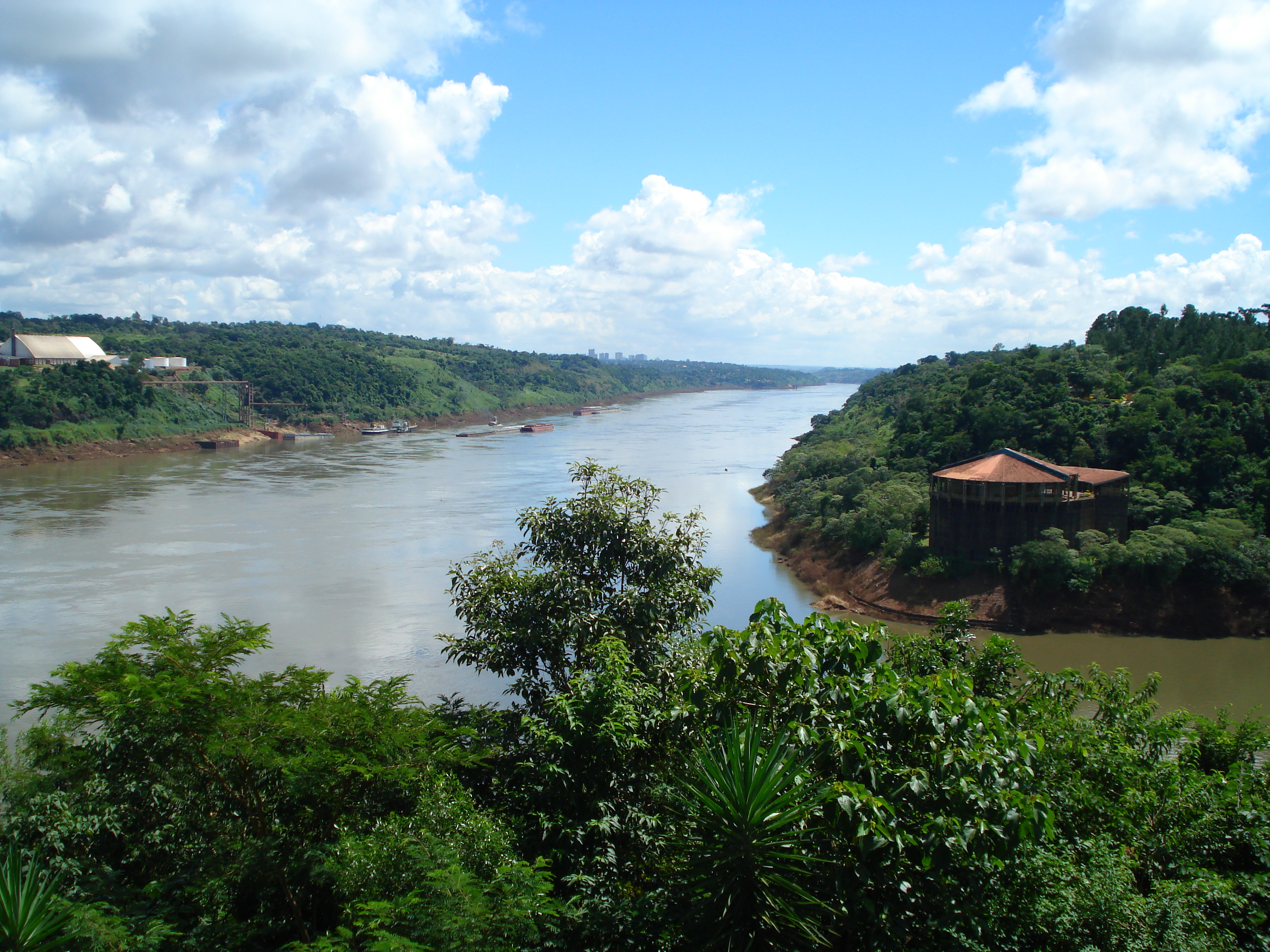
Rich landscape of Paraguay on the Brazilian border

Throughout its history, agriculture in Paraguay has been the mainstay of the economy. This trend has continued today and in the late 1980s the agricultural sector generally accounted for 48 percent of the nation's employment, 23 percent of GDP, and 98 percent of export earnings. The sector comprised a strong food and cash crop base, a large livestock subsector including cattle ranching and beef production, and a vibrant timber industry.

Growth in agriculture was very rapid from the early 1970s to the early 1980s, a period when cotton and soybean prices soared and cropland under cultivation expanded as a result of agricultural colonization. Growth in agriculture slowed from an average of 7.5 percent annual growth in the 1970s to approximately 3.5 percent in the mid-to-late 1980s. Agricultural output was routinely affected by weather conditions. Flooding in 1982 and 1983 and severe droughts in 1986 hurt not only agriculture, but, because of the key role of the sector, virtually every other sector of the economy as well.

In the aggregate, however, the advances experienced by the sector during the 1970s and 1980s did not reach many of the small farmers, who continued to use traditional farming methods and lived at a subsistence level. Despite the abundance of land, the distribution of the country's farmlands remained highly skewed, favoring large farms. Epitomizing the country's economic activity in general, the agricultural sector was consolidating its quick expansion over the two previous decades and only beginning to tap its potential in the late 1980s.

== Land tenure ==
The history of land tenure in Paraguay is distinct from that in most Latin American countries. Although there had been a system of land grants to conquistadors, Paraguay was distinguished by Jesuit reducciones that dominated rural life for over a century. After the expulsion of the Jesuits in 1767 and later the Spanish, the state had become the owner of 60 percent of the country's land by the mid-19th century. Large tracts of land were sold, mostly to Argentines to pay the country's war debt from the Paraguayan War. This was the beginning of the concentration of land in Paraguay not in the hands of the Spanish or of a local elite but rather of foreign investors. Land policy remained controversial until the 1930s, when there was a broader consensus for the titling of land to users of the land and mediating between latifundio and minifundio (small landholding). After 1954, multinational agribusinesses, mostly Brazilian and American, played an increasing role in the economy, often purchasing enormous tracts of land devoted to raising cattle, cotton, soybeans, and timber.

The most striking change in land tenure from 1956 to 1981 was the kind of ownership of the farms. In the 1956 census, 49 percent of all farmers squatted on their land compared with only 30 percent in the 1981 census. This data suggested an increasing interest on the part of small farmers in obtaining title to their land in the face of growing land pressures. The 1981 census also indicated that 58 percent of all farms were owned outright and 15 percent were sharecropper farms; the 1956 census showed that 39 percent of farms belonged to farmers and 12 percent were worked by sharecroppers.

Another striking element of the 1981 agricultural census was the great disparity between small and large landholdings. According to the census, 1 percent of the nation's more than 273,000 farms covered 79 percent of the nation's farmland in use. These large farms had an average landholding of almost 7,300 hectares. Many of the largest holdings were cattle farms in the Chaco Department. By contrast, the smallest farms, which made up 35 percent of all farms, covered only 1 percent of the land, making the average size of a minifundio 1.7 hectares, or less than was necessary for one family's subsistence. Still, the 1981 census figures were somewhat more encouraging than those in the 1956 census, which showed that 1 percent of farms covered 87 percent of the land, and 46 percent of farms covered only 1 percent of the farmland. Another encouraging trend that the census quantified was the declining number of farms under 5 hectares in size and the growth of small to medium-size farms (5 to 99.9 hectares).

Despite these positive trends, the 1981 census pointed to an increasing problem of landlessness. Census figures indicated that roughly 14 percent of all peasants were landless. Landlessness historically had been mitigated by the undeveloped nature of the eastern border region. Because the owners of estates in the region used only a portion of their holdings, peasants could squat on the properties without retribution. Land pressures also were alleviated by the vast tracts of untitled land in the east. Beginning in the 1960s, however, competition for land in the area increased dramatically. Many estate owners sold their lands to agribusinesses; the new proprietors, who were committed to an efficient and extensive use of their holdings, sometimes called upon the government to remove squatters from the lands.

Squatters also came into competition with Paraguayan colonists and Brazilian immigrants. Thousands of colonists were resettled in the eastern region under the government's agrarian reform program. The Brazilian immigration occurred as a result of a dramatic increase in land prices in the 1970s in the neighboring Brazilian state of Paraná. Many farmers sold their properties and crossed into Paraguay, where land was much cheaper. By the late 1980s, at least half of the population in the Canendiyú Department and Alto Paraná Department was Brazilian.

== Land reform and policy ==
After decades of public controversy over government land policy, two important agrarian laws were enacted in 1963 that guided land policy through the late 1980s. The Agrarian Statute, as the laws were called, limited the maximum size of a single landholding to 10,000 hectares in Eastern Paraguay and 20,000 hectares in the Chaco, with landholdings in excess of this size subject to taxes or possible purchase. This law, however, like many of the laws involved in economic policy, was enforced only loosely or not at all. A more fundamental component of the Agrarian Statute was the creation of the Rural Welfare Institute (Instituto de Bienestar Rural—IBR) in 1963 by Juan Manuel Frutos Fleitas, a minister in the Stroessner government. The IBR, which superseded the Agrarian Reform Institute, became the central government agency mandated to plan colonization programs, issue land titles to farmers, and provide new colonies with support services such as credit, markets, roads, technical assistance, and other social services as available. From 1963 to the late 1980s, the IBR titled millions of hectares of land and created hundreds of colonies, directly affecting the circumstances of roughly one-quarter of the population. In the late 1980s, the IBR remained the key government agency, along with the Ministry of Agriculture and Livestock, in serving the land needs of small farmers.

Although the IBR played an important role in stimulating the celebrated "March to the East," the exodus from Paraguay's central zone to the eastern border region that began in the 1960s was a spontaneous process. The task of the IBR was so enormous and its resources so limited that many of the country's farmers bypassed the institute in order to participate in the eastward land grab. Thousands of Paraguayans took it upon themselves to trek eastward to the abundant, fertile, but forested land of Alto Paraná, Itapúa, and other eastern departments. Many of the colonists were pioneers in the truest sense, clearing densely forested areas for farming mostly by axe. Few farmers had access to institutional credit, and these newly colonized areas generally lacked schools, roads, and other amenities.

== Land use ==
Paraguay comprises a total of 40.6 million hectares of land. But based on soil surveys, analysts have estimated that only one-fifth of that area is appropriate for normal crop production. According to the 1981 agricultural census, 7 percent of the land was dedicated to crop production, 20 percent to forestry, 26 percent to livestock, and 47 percent to other purposes. Theseortant trends in Paraguayan agriculture was the increase in the percentage of land under cultivation, which had been only 2 percent in 1956. Livestock activity fluctuated greatly during the 1970s and 1980s but generally had increased, rising above the 22-percent land use reported in 1956. The improved utilization of agricultural resources resulted from increased colonization, favorable price movements for cash crops, further mechanization, and infrastructural improvements connecting produce with markets.

For agricultural purposes, the country can be divided into three regions: the Chaco, the central region, and the eastern region. The semiarid Chaco contained extensive grazing land that supported 40 percent of the country's livestock. Although the Chaco region covered 60 percent of the country's land mass, it contained only 3 percent of the population and accounted for less than 2 percent of crop production. With the exception of the Mennonite colonies in the central Chaco, there was little crop activity. A more suitable location for crops was the central region in the vicinity of Asunción, where traditional crop production had dominated since peasants were pushed toward the capital at the end of the Paraguayan War. But government policies since the 1960s had favored breaking up minifundios in the central region and establishing larger, more efficient farms in the fertile eastern border region, which is endowed with rich, varied soils, well distributed annual rainfalls, and millions of hectares of hardwood forests. Together these regions cover some 16 million hectares, 40 percent of the country's land and approximately 98 percent of the country's crop land. Agricultural surveys in the east, the new focus of agricultural activity, have determined that 30 percent of the region is suitable for intensive agriculture, 40 percent for livestock, 20 percent for moderate agriculture or livestock use, and 10 percent for forestry.

The country's land use changed rapidly in the 1970s and 1980s as foreign investment, Paraguayan and Brazilian colonists, the construction of Itaipú, favorable commodity prices, and new infrastructure all contributed to the penetration of the dense eastern region. Increased prices for soybeans and cotton beginning in the early 1970s changed the Paraguayan landscape more drastically than any other factor. By the late 1980s, cotton and soybeans accounted for over 1.1 million hectares, or over 40 percent of all land in crops and contributed over 60 percent of exports. Although government policies favored export crops, the rapid expansion of cash crops was largely a direct response that Paraguay's free-market economy made to the rise in the international demand for these products.

== Production ==
In 2018, Paraguay was the 6th largest producer of soy in the world, with 11 million tons produced (behind the US, Brazil, Argentina, China and India). In the same year, the country produced 5.3 million tons of maize, and 6.1 million tons of sugarcane, ranking 21st in the world in both; this year, the country also produced 3.3 million tons of cassava, 892 thousand tons of rice, 722 thousand tons of wheat, 223 thousand tons of orange, 116 thousand tons of yerba mate, 107 thousand tons of sorghum, in addition to smaller productions of other agricultural products.

== Crops ==
=== Soybeans ===
Soybeans had replaced cotton as the country's most important crop by the 1980s. A relatively new crop for Paraguay, soybeans were not produced in any quantity until 1967, when they were introduced as the summer rotation crop in a national plan for self-sufficiency in wheat. After soybean prices nearly tripled in 1973, however, much of the land slated for wheat was sown with soybeans instead. As the lucrative nature of soybean cultivation and processing became apparent, several large agribusinesses from Brazil, the United States, and Italy engaged in large-scale, commercial production of soybeans and soybean oil. It is difficult to exaggerate the drastic growth soybeans enjoyed in Paraguay. In 1970 soybeans covered only 54,600 hectares and had an annual production of over 75,000 tons. By 1987 soybeans covered some 718,800 hectares, more than any other crop, with an annual output of 1 million tons and export revenues of approximately US$150 million. The soybean crop grew primarily in the newly colonized departments of Itapúa, Alto Paraná, Canendiyú, and Amambay. Soybeans were produced principally for the world market and sold both as a raw bean and as a processed oil, which was also consumed locally. Soybean prices generally rose beginning in the 1970s but experienced significant fluctuations in the early to mid-1980s before recovering in the late 1980s. The major constraint on growth in soybean output, besides price fluctuations, was the lack of storage, drying facilities, and local processing capacity.

=== Cotton ===
Cotton was one of Paraguay's oldest crops, grown since the time of the Jesuit missions. The government encouraged cotton production after the crop was nearly wiped out by the Paraguayan War. Cotton was especially suited to the Paraguayan climate and soils and was grown primarily by small farmers in the central region. Cotton farming also experienced extremely rapid growth in the 1970s and 1980s. In 1970 only 46,900 hectares were sown with cotton, producing a volume of over 37,000 tons. By 1985, however, 385,900 hectares were covered with cotton, yielding almost 159,000 tons. Those figures had dropped to 275,000 hectares and 84,000 tons during the drought of 1986. Foreign-owned, large-scale, commercial production in the eastern border region was surpassing central region production in the late 1980s. Despite the advances in cotton production, cotton cultivation in the 1980s was still characterized by low yields and a low technological level. Even more so than soybeans, cotton suffered wide price fluctuations, and many small farmers who came to rely on cotton revenues in the 1970s became vulnerable to external price fluctuations in the following decade. Some cotton fiber was used domestically, but about 80 percent of the country's crop was processed into cotton lint at more than ten textile-processing factories. Cotton exports in 1987 earned about US$100 million, with most exports going to Uruguay, Britain, France, Germany, and Japan.

=== Tobacco ===
Another key export crop was tobacco. Used domestically for centuries, cigarettes and cigars also earned foreign exchange. During parts of the early 20th century, tobacco was Paraguay's principal agricultural export to Western Europe. Tobacco production slowed in the 1970s with the advent of massive soybean and cotton production. Another reason for the tobacco crop's decline was the inability of the domestic cigarette factories to improve quality control and compete with smuggled brands. Wide price fluctuations of tobacco also explained dwindling production. Despite these difficulties, tobacco made a slight recovery in the 1980s. The area cultivated rose from 7,600 hectares in 1980 to over 8,000 hectares in 1987. Output increased from 11,500 to 12,000 tons. Tobacco was grown throughout Paraguay, mostly by small farmers. Cigarettes and cigars were exported to Argentina, France, and Spain. Tobacco exports were valued at approximately US$9 million in 1987.

Paraguay was also believed to be an expanding producer of marijuana in the 1980s. One United States Congressional report in the 1980s estimated annual production at 3,000 tons.

=== Coffee ===
Coffee was another export crop but of much less importance. Cultivated since the times of the Jesuits, coffee was grown in the central and eastern border regions for local and export markets. Most modern coffee production methods derived from the practices of German colonists in the eastern region. Coffee production boomed in the late 1970s but waned in the early 1980s. In the late 1980s, coffee output rose again, following a pattern of fluctuating production based on price movements. In 1987 approximately 9.2 million hectares of coffee yielded 18.4 million tons of exports with an estimated value of US$44.7 million.

=== Sugarcane ===
Sugarcane remained an important cash crop for small farmers in the late 1980s. Unlike many countries in the Western Hemisphere, Paraguay saw sugarcane as a crop of the future, not because of its use for refined sugar and molasses, but as an input to ethanol, an increasingly popular energy alternative for the country. Sugarcane was planted in Paraguay as early as 1549 with seedlings from Peru, and sugar had been exported since 1556. After the devastation of Paraguay's two major wars, however, local output did not meet domestic demand until the mid-20th century, after which exports were revived. Since then, sugar production has fluctuated with price changes but generally has increased. Paraguay's climate is appropriate for sugarcane cultivation, but traditional methods and inefficient small-scale production limited harvests. Besides low yields, the industry suffered from outdated milling facilities and high production costs. Sugar production, however, was expected to be modernized and increasingly commercialized as a result of its high government priority as an input to an alternative energy source. Some 65,000 hectares of sugarcane produced 3.2 million tons of sugar in 1987, including 7,500 tons of sugar exports valued at US$2.3 million. These figures were highs for the decade.

=== Oils ===
Numerous crops were grown partially or entirely for their value as exported processed oils. Oilseeds represented one of Paraguay's largest agro-industries. One of Latin America's largest oilseed exporters, Paraguay processed cottonseed, soybean, peanut, coconut, palm, castor bean, flaxseed, and sunflower-seed oils. Industrial countries in particular consumed oilseeds as a lower-priced substitute for more traditional oils, which also were higher in cholesterol. Some oil was used locally as well. Paraguay also produced a number of nonvegetable oils, such as tung oil and petitgrain oil. Tung oil, derived from tung nuts, was used as a drying agent in paints. Petit-grain oil, derived from Paraguay's bitter oranges, was used in cosmetics, soaps, perfumes, and flavorings. In the 1980s Paraguay remained one of the world's leading exporters of petit-grain oil.

=== Food Crops ===
Manioc (cassava), maize, beans, and peanuts, the four basic crops of the Guaraní Indians, were still the country's major food crops in the 1980s. Manioc, the staple of the Paraguayan diet, had been cultivated in nearly every area of the country for centuries. Called mandioca in Paraguay, the root crop was the main starch of the diet. Manioc did not experience the rapid explosion of cultivation that cotton, soybean, and maize did. Nevertheless, manioc yields ranked as some of the best in Latin America. In 1986 about 220,000 hectares produced 3.4 million tons of manioc. These figures compared favorably with 1976 data, which recorded 106,500 hectares producing 1.6 million tons.

Maize was Paraguay's most rapidly growing food crop. From the early 1960s to the late 1980s, corn output multiplied rapidly, covering more hectares than any crop except soybeans. After the doubling of both hectares cultivated and total output in the 1970s, corn production accelerated even further in the 1980s, mostly because of continued agricultural colonization. In 1980 approximately 376,600 hectares yielded 584,700 tons of corn, compared with an unprecedented 547,000 hectares of corn in 1987, which harvested 917,00 tons. Like manioc, maize was grown throughout the country, but the departments of Itapúa, Paraguarí, Caaguazú, and Alto Paraná were responsible for most of the harvest. White corn was the traditional corn of Paraguay, but yellow, highyield hybrids were increasingly common, especially on larger farms. Most corn went to domestic human consumption; roughly a third of domestic corn consumption took place in the form of feed grain for the livestock sector. In addition, some surplus corn was exported to Brazil and Argentina, depending on weather conditions and annual output.

Other principal food crops included beans, peanuts, sorghum, sweet potatoes, and rice. Many types of beans were grown in Paraguay, including lima beans, french beans, and peas. Since the 1970s, however, bean production had been declining because of the profitability of other crops. Peanuts, a traditional though marginal crop, expanded in the 1970s and 1980s and often were intercropped with cotton. Peanuts also were processed as an oilseed. Sorghum, a drought-resistant crop, was grown primarily as feed for livestock and was considered a potential crop for the arid Alto Chaco. Sweet potatoes, another main staple crop, like many other food crops, did not expand significantly in the 1970s, and harvests contracted measurably in the 1980s. Rice production, by contrast, expanded after high-yield varieties were introduced in the 1960s. Rice is not a dietary staple in Paraguay as it is in many Latin American countries, but it is popular and consumed in ever-greater quantities. Self-sufficient in rice, Paraguay showed potential as a regional exporter because of its rich soils and irrigation potential along the Río Paraná.

After attempting for twenty years to become self-sufficient in wheat production, Paraguay reached wheat self-sufficiency in 1986. For two decades, the government's national wheat program had encountered numerous obstacles: seeds inappropriate for Paraguay's climate, skyrocketing prices for alternative crops, poor weather, blight infection, and a lack of proper farming practices. From 1976 to 1986, however, the number of hectares covered with wheat multiplied some sixfold, from 24,200 to over 140,000. Wheat output reached 233,000 tons in 1986, 33,000 tons above national consumption. In 1987 approximately 175,000 hectares of wheat fields yielded 270,000 tons, a record high at the time. Over half of all wheat was grown in Itapúa, where most soil testing, tractors, and fertilizers were used. Despite the rapid expansion, wheat production in the 1980s was hurt by floods, droughts, and cheap contraband, all of which caused flour mills to operate at about half of capacity. Smuggled Brazilian flour sometimes was half the price of Paraguayan flour. Future growth in the wheat industry was constrained by a lack of adequate grain-cleaning and storage facilities.

==== Fruits and vegetables ====
Paraguayans cultivated numerous other fruits, vegetables, and spices for both domestic consumption and export. Most common were citrus fruits, which were ideal for Paraguay's subtropical and tropical climate. Paraguay also produced pineapples, which according to some sources originated in Paraguay, and peaches, which were farmed commercially by fruit companies from the United States. Bananas, plums, strawberries, pears, avocados, guavas, papayas, mangoes, grapes, apples, watermelon, and other melons were cultivated to varying degrees as well. Vegetable production included gourds, squash, tomatoes, and carrots. Onions and garlic were widely grown and commonly used in cooking.

A uniquely Paraguayan crop was the yerba maté plant. Yerba maté was grown throughout the country, especially Eastern Paraguay for both domestic and regional markets. Large-scale production was traditionally dominated by Argentine and British interests. Despite its popularity, yerba maté output fell significantly in the 1970s and 1980s, as farmers switched to more lucrative crops.

== Livestock ==
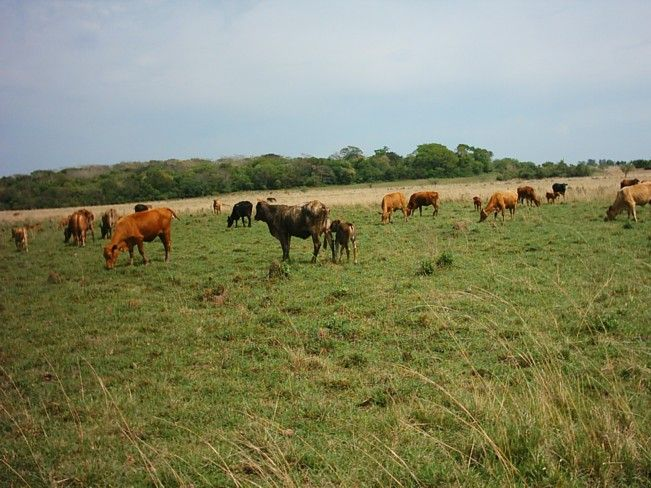

Raising and marketing livestock, a traditional source of livelihood in Paraguay, remained a major segment of agriculture and the economy at large during the 1980s. Livestock output accounted for roughly 30 percent of agricultural production and about 20 percent of the sector's exports. The raising of livestock represented more than a quarter of total land use and 80 percent of all capital investment in agriculture. Paraguay's vigorous livestock sector also was responsible for the country's high per capita production and consumption of meat and dairy goods. It was estimated that 40 percent of the country's land was especially suited for livestock and some 20 percent generally suitable. Endowed with plentiful grazing lands, Paraguay had vast potential for livestock development.

After the importation of 7 cows and a bull by the Spanish in the mid-1550s, the country's cattle herds swelled to some 3 million head by the time of the Paraguayan War, the largest herds in the Southern Cone. As with every other sector of the Paraguayan economy, the war devastated the country's livestock sector, leaving only 15,000 head. It was not until World War I that domestic demand was met locally and significant exports left the country. By the end of World War II, beef exports had become a major foreignexchange earner. Beef production and exports fluctuated considerably in the postwar period because of international price movements, weather conditions, government pricing policies, and other factors. In 1987 the country's cattle herd stood at about 8 million head with an annual slaughter rate of 1 million head. In that same year, 75 percent of the slaughter went to the domestic market and the remaining 25 percent to the export market.

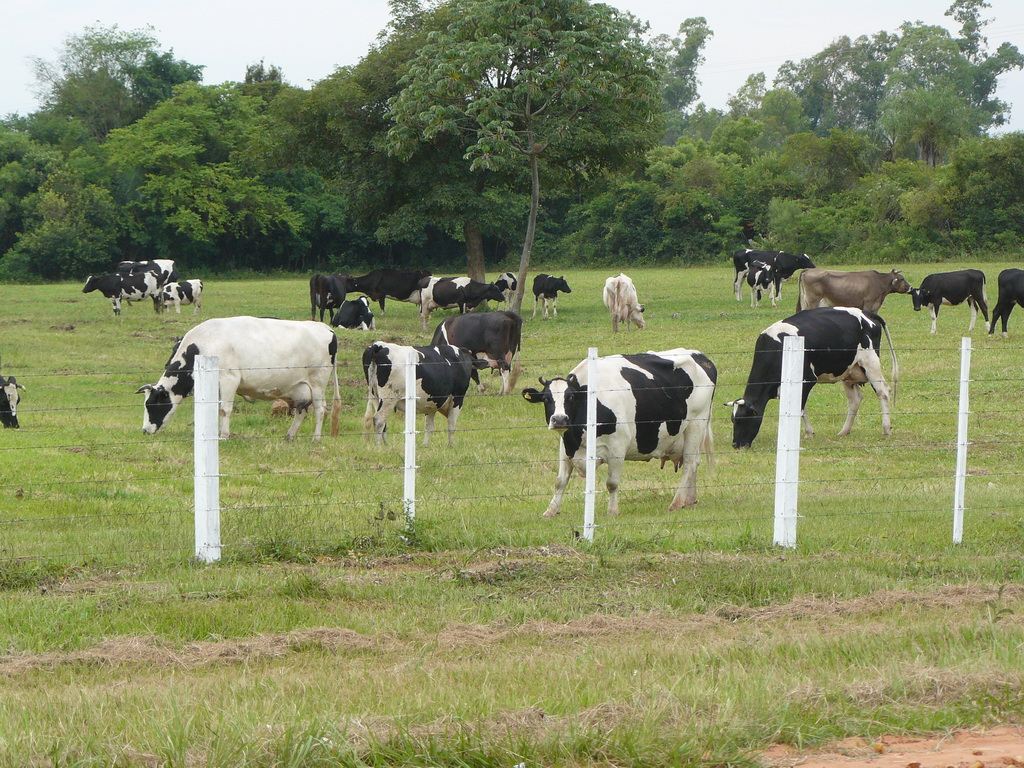

Cattle, mostly beef cattle, were found throughout the countryside. The Chaco region was best known for its contribution to cattle raising because of its lack of crops and its sprawling ranches. Nevertheless, the cattle population density of Eastern Paraguay, 0.6 head per hectare, was actually higher than that of the Chaco region, 0.3 head per hectare.

The country's breeding stock was primarily Spanish criollo, although over the years considerable crossbreeding with English breeds and zebu cattle from Brazil had taken place. Although cattle were numerous in Paraguay, the country lacked a sufficient number of pure-bred breeding cattle. The livestock sector also suffered from a low calving percentage, a high mortality rate, and a long fattening period for steers. Artificial insemination was increasingly common. To a certain extent, cattle raising reflected the disparities in agriculture in general. There were numerous farmers who owned only a few head of relatively unproductive cattle that were slaughtered for the local market under relatively poor sanitary conditions. By contrast, extremely large cattle ranches typically were owned by expatriates and butchered more productive animals for both national and international markets.

Seventy slaughterhouses for the domestic market and eight for the export market operated in the 1980s. Local slaughterhouses often could not pass sanitary inspections, but government inspection efforts were focused on improving quality control of exports to meet the stringent regulations of foreign beef markets. The country's beef exports expanded until 1974, when Paraguay lost access to European Economic Community (EEC) markets and lower world prices further stagnated output. Beef exports responded strongly but erratically in the 1980s as the government's minimum export price system and contraband activity undercut greater export efforts. For example, beef exports were a mere 3,100 tons in 1985, 48,000 tons in 1986, and 18,000 tons in 1987, the last being the more typical figure. The 1986 boom in beef exports was the direct result of beef shortages in Brazil caused by price controls under its "Cruzado Plan." Paraguay's principal export markets were Brazil, Peru, Chile, the EEC (specialty items only), Colombia, Uruguay, and Saudi Arabia. Missing from official 1987 data, however, was the unregistered sale of an estimated 300,000 head of cattle along the Brazilian border.

Official government policy favored strong cattle development and exports, a view articulated in national livestock programs since the early 1960s. A major policy tool to promote livestock growth was the FG. The FG was not only the major lender to the industry, but it also provided certain veterinary equipment and medicine, encouraged quality control in meat and dairy products, and operated a model farm in the Chaco.

Dairy cattle represented only a small fraction of the total herd. Most milk production occurred at an estimated 400 dairy farms in Asunción, Puerto Presidente Stroessner, Encarnación, and Filadelfia. The best yields came from holstein-friesian dairy cattle followed by crossbreeds and criollo. High feed costs and the general inefficiency of small dairy farmers slowed the growth of the industry. The country produced approximately 180 million liters of milk a year in the late 1980s.

Other livestock activity including poultry farming and the swine industry. Some of the most productive poultry farming took place in the Mennonite colonies, in Japanese colonies in the eastern border region, and in the greater Asunción area. Observers estimated that there were over 14 million chickens, 400,000 ducks, 55,000 turkeys, and several other types of fowl. Egg production stood at 600 million per year in the late 1980s and was growing at about 4 percent a year. Pig farming was a relatively minor activity, engaged in mostly by small farmers. The pork industry's greatest structural problems were the high cost of feed and consumer preferences for beef. Government policy emphasized self-sufficiency in feed grown on small pig farms. Paraguay's swine population amounted to roughly 1.3 million in the late 1980s and had grown at a rate of 6 percent a year in the first half of the decade.

== Forestry and fishing ==
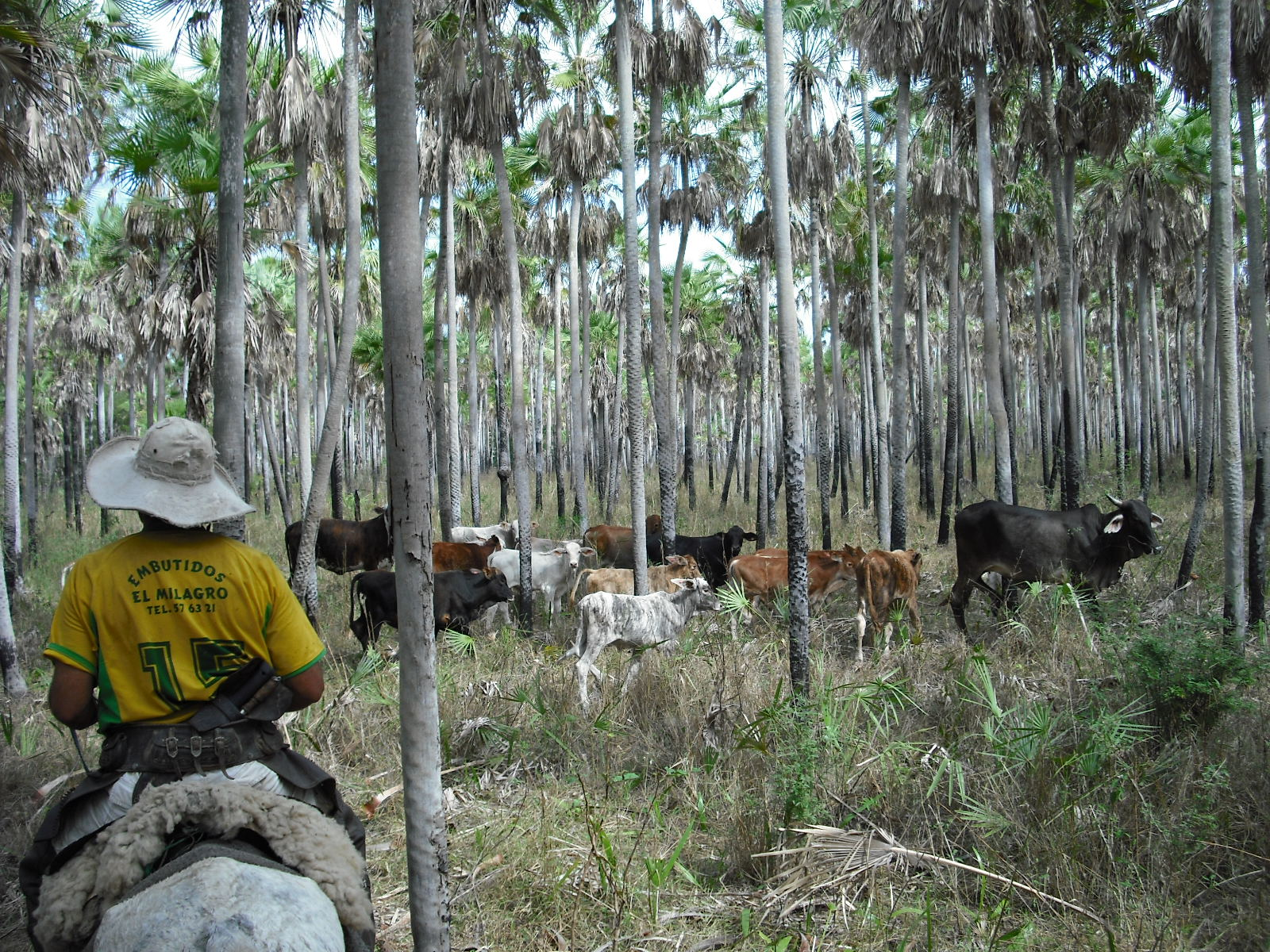

Forestlands constituted approximately one-third of Paraguay's total area. Utilized for fuelwoods, timber exports, and extracts, the country's wooded areas constituted a key economic resource. Approximately half of all woodlands contained commercially valuable timber. In the 1980s about 4 million hectares were being lumbered commercially. Forestry data was only a broad estimate, however, as a full third of timber production was believed to be exported illegally to Brazil. Registered forestry exports accounted for about 8 percent of total exports during most of the 1980s. Forests have played an important role in the economy since the 19th century with the processing of yerba maté and the resilient quebracho. Because of a general decline in tannin exports, however, the quebracho played a correspondingly less important role in forestry.

Officially, Paraguay produced over 1 million cubic meters of lumber a year in the 1980s. Trees were processed at over 150 small, mostly outdated sawmills that produced wood products for the paper, cardboard, construction, and furniture industries and for export. Trees also fueled the country's railroad and largest steel mill. The country's woodlands contained over forty-five species of wood suitable for export, but fewer than ten species were exported in quantity. Paraguay was recognized as an exporter of fine timber, and its wood exports were internationally competitive. In 1987 lumber exports to Argentina, Brazil, and Mexico earned US$50 million in foreign exchange.

Despite the abundance of premium forests, deforestation was progressing at an alarming rate, about 150,000 to 200,000 hectares per year. The rapid depletion of Paraguay's woods was caused by the clearing of virgin forests associated with agricultural colonization, the farming practice of land-clearing and treeburning, and the felling of trees for charcoal and the other fuelwoods that accounted for 80 percent of household energy consumption.

Although the country contained enormous installed energy capacity, fuelwood remained the most important domestic source of energy in the 1980s. In fact, Paraguay's per capita consumption of fuelwood was the highest in all of Latin America and the Caribbean and nearly three times the level of other South American countries. The deforestation question was complicated by the distribution of forestlands and population. Southeast Paraguay was being deforested the most rapidly. From the mid-1970s to the mid-1980s, that region's forestland decreased from just under 45 percent of all land to 30 percent. The Chaco maintained a large number of forestlands and shrubs, but they could not be economically exploited.

Government policy was slow to respond to deforestation because of the traditional abundance of forests as well as the generally laissez-faire dynamics of the land colonization process. In 1973 the government established a National Forestry Service under the Ministry of Agriculture and Livestock to protect, conserve, and expand the country's forests. The service, however, was hindered by a lack of resources, staff, serious government initiatives, and public education on the problem of deforestation. The planting of fast-growing trees and modernization of the lumber industry were recommended by the government, but only about 7,000 hectares of new forests were seeded annually in the mid-1980s. Given these levels of deforestation and reforestation, analysts estimated that few commercial lumbering lands would be available by the year 2020.

For landlocked Paraguay, fishing was only a minor industry. It focused on more than 230 freshwater fish species in the country's rivers and streams. Only fifty or so species of fish were eaten, dorado and pacú being the most popular. Some fishing companies, mostly family operations, maintained boats, refrigeration facilities, and marketing outlets.

== Organizations ==
The Paraguayan Agricultural Development (PAD) is an agricultural organization based in the country. It is a large-scale project, formed by an important group of Paraguayan entrepreneurs and Argentineans in conjunction with the Moises Bertoni Foundation and the Environmental Law and Economics Institute (IDEA).

The organization evaluates economic, social and environmental values for companies in Paraguay, ensuring that they comply with social and environmental regulations for instance, drawing up management plans and granting licenses and offering expertise on the use of agro chemicals and managing the Paraguayan environment in coordination with ideologies of sustainable development.

== Works cited ==
- Hanratty, Dennis Michael; Meditz, Sandra W., eds. (1990). Paraguay: a country study. Washington, D.C.: Federal Research Division, Library of Congress. OCLC 44212689.
