= Cawy Bottling Company =

Cuban soda beverage company

- Industry: Soda beverage company
- Founded: Cuba, 1948
- Headquarters: Miami, Florida
- Website: www.cawy.net

Cawy Bottling Company is a soda beverage company founded in Cuba in 1948 and nationalized following the Cuban Revolution. Two of the company's executives emigrated to the U.S. and restarted the brand in 1962, first offering lemon-lime soda and then diversifying outside of that competitive market by offering Materva (a yerba mate flavored soda) and then other tropical flavors.

== Products ==
Cawy's soda brands include lemon-lime soda, Materva, Jupiña, Champ's Cola and Quinabeer. Jupiña is the company's best-selling line. Other offerings from the company include Cawy Watermelon, Coco Solo (a coconut soda), Fruti Cola (a red cola), Malta Cawy (a Malta (soft drink)), Trimalta, Rica Malt Tonic, and Rica Orange Mandarin.

=== Jupiña ===
Jupiña (pronounced hoo-peen-yah) is a sweet pineapple flavored carbonated beverage. The name is from a condensed version of "Jugo de Piña" (juice of pineapple).

=== Quinabeer ===
Quinabeer is a carbonated beverage produced by Cawy Bottling Company. It is very sweet with hints of orange and cherry flavor. It has been described as tasting like a combination of cream soda and cola. Another source says it is "like root beer, but sweeter".

Quinabeer cans feature a stylized drawing of a bicep flexing "Champion George Prince". The same figure also adorns Cawy's Champ's Cola, a lighter version of Quinabeer.

== Distribution ==
Cawy's beverages are distributed in the United States, Canada, Central America and Spain.

== See also ==
- Champagne soda
- Ironbeer
