= Materva =

Cuban soft drink

- Can and glass of Materva, showing the color of the drink
- Product type: Soft drink
- Current owner: Cawy Bottling Co.
- Country: Cuba
- Introduced: United States, Canada, Spain
- Previous owners: 1920 – Materva Soft Drink Company
- Website: cawy.net

Materva is a mate-based soft drink, originally produced and popularized in Cuba prior to the Cuban Revolution. It has been produced in Miami since the 1960s by Cawy Bottling Company.

== Drink ==
Materva is a carbonated drink made from yerba mate, a tea popular in Argentina, Paraguay, Uruguay, and Brazil. Unlike the somewhat bitter tea-like mate on which it is based, Materva is sweet, with a flavor described as similar to ginger ale or cream soda.

Current production includes a diet version called Diet Materva.

== History ==
The Materva Soft Drink Company was founded in Matanzas, Cuba, in 1920. Materva became known as a "famous Cuban brand" and advertising included celebrity endorsements that touted the drink's energizing properties.

During the Cuban Revolution, the Materva bottling plant was targeted for strikes by revolutionaries, along with the Coca-Cola and Pepsi bottling plants in the country. Materva was produced and sold in Cuba until 1960 when it was nationalized along with other private industry. It is no longer produced in Cuba.

The Cawy Bottling Company of Miami was founded to produce the Cawy lemon-lime soda that had been popular in Cuba. The company began producing Materva in the United States in the 1960s in an attempt to diversify after the founder of the company realized that there were many large American companies already competing with lemon-lime drinks.

== Significance in Cuban and Miami culture ==
Materva has been described as a part of the "standard Cuban pantry", and as "the old standby Cuban soda". Because of its significance as a popular drink in Cuba prior to the Revolution, it is often cited as a source of "shared memories" and "nostalgia" of pre-Revolutionary Cuba by Cubans who live in the United States.

In Miami, politicians use the drink to symbolize Cuban-ness, such as when a congressional candidate told local media in 2010 that he had spoken about Materva to President Obama during a presidential visit to the city. Travel books also often recommend the drink to visitors to Miami. In 2002, Materva was given the "Best Local Soft Drink" award by the Miami New Times.

== See also ==
- Coco Rico
- Ironbeer
- Club-Mate
- List of soft drinks by country
