= Club-Mate =

Caffeinated maté drink

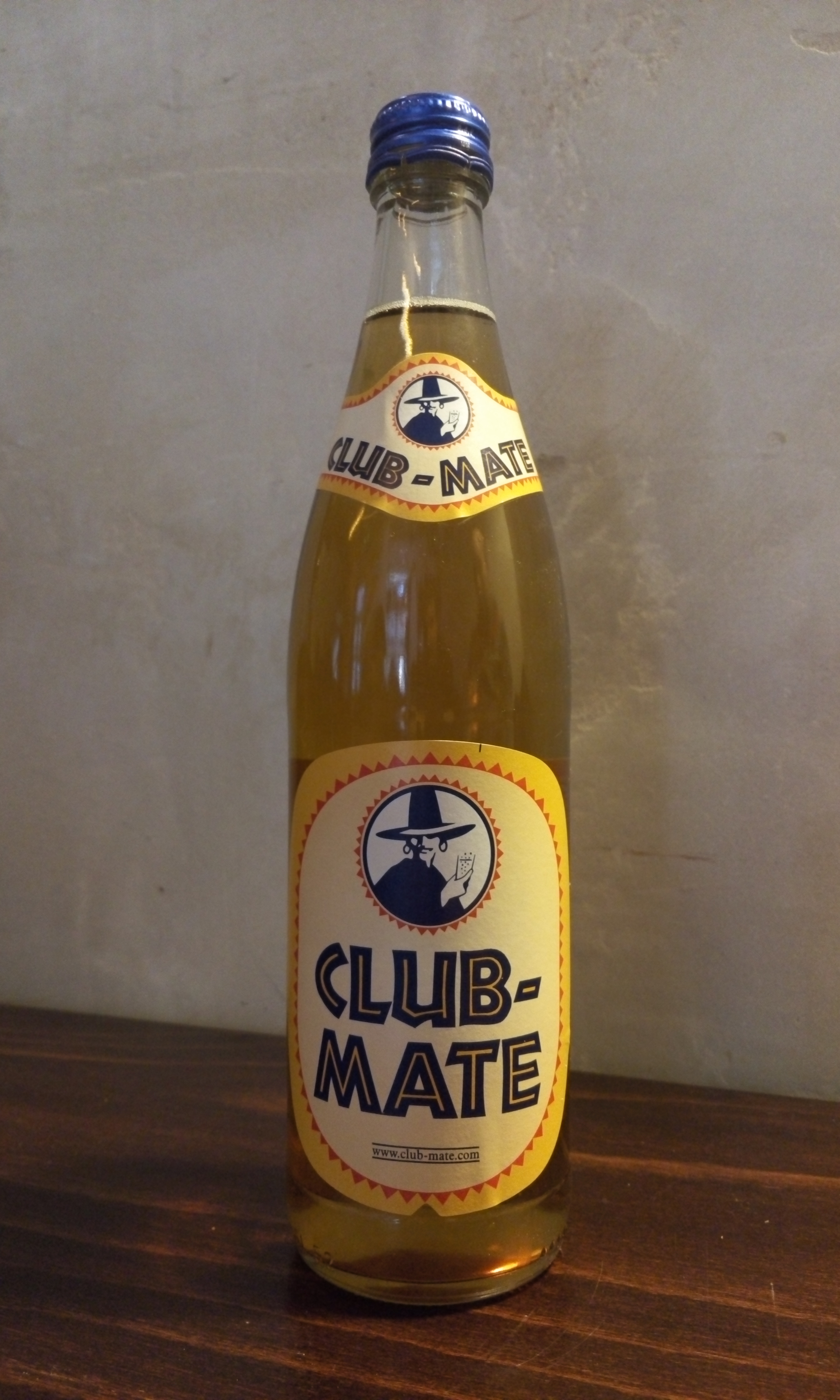
- Origin: Germany
- Introduced: 1924
- Website: club-mate.de/en

Club-Mate (German pronunciation: [ˈklʊp ˈmaːtə]) is a caffeinated carbonated mate-extract beverage made by the Loscher Brewery (Brauerei Loscher) in Münchsteinach, Germany, which originated in 1924. Club-Mate has 20 mg of caffeine per 100 ml, sugar content of 5 g per 100 ml, and 20 kcal per 100 ml, which is lower than most energy drinks. Club-Mate is available in 0.33-litre and 0.5-litre bottles.

Some Club-Mate bottles include the slogan "man gewöhnt sich daran", which roughly translates as "you'll get used to it".

Examples of Club-Mate-based mixed drinks are: vodka-mate; Tschunk, a combination of rum and Club-Mate; Jaeger-Mate, a mix of Jägermeister and Club-Mate; and the Joey special, a mix of Whiskey and Club-Mate.

== History ==
Geola Beverages of Dietenhofen, Germany originally formulated and marketed Club-Mate under the name Sekt-Bronte in 1924. The drink was only known regionally until acquired by Loscher and marketed under the name Club-Mate in 1994.

In December 2007, Loscher marketed a Club-Mate winter edition. The limited-edition Club-Mate consists of the original formula mixed with cardamom, cinnamon, star anise and citrus extract. It is since sold regularly for a limited time during winter.

In 2009, a Club-Mate-styled cola variety was introduced. Unlike other colas, its recipe includes mate-extract.

In 2013, Club-Mate Granat, a Club-Mate variety with additional pomegranate flavor, was introduced.

Club-Mate Zero, a sugar free version of Club-Mate is available since April 2022.

As of July 2010, the company listed distributors in 60 countries, for example, the United Kingdom, Belgium, Bulgaria, Luxembourg, the United States, Canada, Australia, Hong Kong, Costa Rica and Taiwan.

== Culture ==
Club-Mate has developed a following in computer hacker culture and tech start-ups, especially in Europe. Bruce Sterling wrote in Wired magazine that it is the favorite beverage of Germany's Chaos Computer Club. It is also popular at Noisebridge and HOPE in the United States, Electromagnetic Field in the UK, Farset Labs in Northern Ireland, the Hack-Tic events in the Netherlands and the FOSDEM in Belgium. Club-Mate appeared in numerous leading media websites like Al-Jazeera, TechCrunch and Vice.

For similar reasons, the drink is also popular among ravers in cities across Europe such as Berlin.

== Ingredients and variations ==
- Water
- Inverted sugar syrup
- Sugar
- Mate tea extract
- Citric acid
- Caffeine
- Natural flavors
- Caramel color
- Carbonic acid

There are several variations on the original recipe available: Club-Mate IceT Kraftstoff (an iced-tea variant with slightly higher caffeine content (220 mg per L) and more sugar), Club-Mate Granat (with added pomegranate for a more fruity taste) and Club-Mate Winter Edition (with spices giving it a gingerbread-like taste - this edition is only available during the winter months). The latest variation is Club-Mate Zero, a sugar free version.

== Tschunk ==
Tschunk
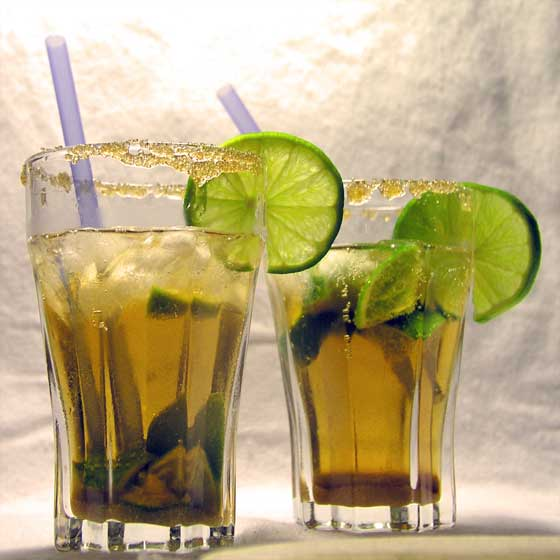
- Type: Highball
- Ingredients: 4–6 cl golden rum or dark rum; limes; Club-Mate; (if desired): brown sugar; ice
- Website: www.club-mate.de/en/
- Preparation: Dice limes, put them together with the brown sugar into a high glass and crush both. Add crushed ice and pour the rum and the Club-Mate over it. Add a straw

Tschunk [ˈtʃʊnk] is a German highball consisting of Club-Mate and white or brown rum. It is usually served with limes and cane or brown sugar.

Like Club-Mate, the Tschunk is a typical drink within European hacker culture and can often be found at scene typical events or locations like the Chaos Communication Congress.

Bloomberg journalist Vernon Silver noted 'It tastes a lot better than it sounds.'

== See also ==
- Materva, a Cuban carbonated mate-based beverage
- Nativa, a carbonated mate-based beverage created by the Coca-Cola Company
