= Taragüi =

Taragüi can refer to:

- The Guarani language name of the city and province of Corrientes, Argentina.
- An Argentine brand of tea and yerba mate.
