= Roger Jaar =

- Born: Fort-de-France, Martinique
- Occupation: Businessman

Roger Jaar is a Haitian businessman with operations largely in the Caribbean and Quebec.

== Biography ==
Jaar was born in Fort-de-France, Martinique, to a family of Arab-Palestinian descent from Bethlehem, but moved to Haiti at a young age.

In 1983, Roger and his brother Raymond Jaar bought the Brasserie de la Couronne, one of the oldest soft drink companies in Haiti and supplier of the popular local drink, Cola Couronne.

After the 1991 Haitian coup d'état of Raoul Cédras, Jaar left Haiti to pursue investments abroad. Initially he considered opening a brewery in Miami; however, he decided to open it in Quebec instead. It is a microbrewery called Les Brasseurs RJ.
