= Ironport (drink) =

Type of beverage

Cherry Ironport as served at the Bluebird in Logan, UT

Ironport (sometimes spelled as two words: Iron Port) is an old-fashioned carbonated soft drink from the early part of the 20th century that was served at soda fountains and is still popular in the Intermountain West. It can still be found in parts of Utah, Southern Idaho, Southern Montana, Western Wyoming, and Eastern Nevada. The flavor has been described as somewhat of a cross between root beer and Caribbean spices and is very similar to the Cuban soda Iron Beer. The flavor has also been described as a black cherry Dr Pepper. It is rumored to have been named after Porter Rockwell.

Often, Ironport is mixed with cherry syrup to make what is called a cherry ironport (e.g., at the Bluebird in Logan, Utah and at Eastman Drug in Soda Springs, Idaho).

The Foods Service Division of Lyons Magnus produces Ironport Concentrate, which can be bought at RSM Food Service in Logan, Utah. As of 2024 Orson H. Gygi Co in Salt Lake City, Utah has started producing Ironport syrup under their own brand.
