= Playadito =

Argentinian brand of yerba mate tea

- Type: Brand
- Industry: Beverage
- Founded: 1932
- Headquarters: Colonia Liebig, Corrientes, Argentina,
- Area served: Worldwide
- Products: Yerba mate, mate cocido
- Owner: Cooperativa Agrícola de la Colonia Liebig Ltda.
- Parent: Cooperativa Agrícola de la Colonia Liebig Ltda.
- Website: cooperativaliebig.com.ar

Playadito is an Argentinian brand of yerba mate tea, first sold in 1932. It currently has a yearly production of 36 million kilograms of processed product.

== Liebig Cooperative ==
Playadito yerba mate is produced, processed, and distributed by a cooperative called Cooperativa Agrícola de la Colonia Liebig (Colonia Liebig's Agricultural Cooperative). The cooperative was founded on February 19, 1926, by a group of immigrants of German origin, most of whom were agricultural producers, and who settled in northeastern Corrientes Province, Northern Argentina, in what is now known as Colonia Liebig. The cooperative, first run by Walter Ostermann, and also joined by Ukrainian and Polish immigrants, had as its first purpose the growth and commercialization of rice, yerba mate, corn, among other products.

During the cooperative’s first decades, the yerba mate was grown, ground, and sold to producers in the region. That is, Cooperativa Liebig first produced raw material, which was then purchased, processed and commercialized by already established yerba mate businesses in the region. Around the middle of the 20th century, the cooperative installed its first mill, and in the late 1970s, industrialization began, and the brand was sold on a large scale.

The cooperative is currently made up of 130 associated agricultural producers, and exports its product to Asian, European and Oceanian markets.

Playadito was first packaged and commercialized as a brand in 1979. It was first advertised in folklore festivals in Argentina, in regional festivities and in "La Rural de Palermo" Livestock Exposition. In 2015 the cooperative established agreements with the supermarket chains in Buenos Aires Carrefour, Coto, Jumbo and Disco. Playadito also started to officially export yerba to China. Today, China is one of its main markets, along with Chile and Syria, a place in which it is the main importer of Argentinean yerba mate. It also exports to Australia, New Zealand, Germany, Spain, the United Kingdom, France and the United States.

== Production process ==
1. The yerba mate leaves that are used in the production of Playadito have an approximate length of 10cm, slightly jagged edges, and a dark green coloration. When harvesting time comes, that is, from December to September, the yerba mate is harvested manually or mechanically.
2. Once gathered, the leaves are transported to drying facilities, where a three-part heating process takes place:
  1. First, the leaves are exposed to temperatures up to 600°C, to prevent the fermentation process from happening. This first heat shock is locally called "sapecado".
  2. Then, the leaves are exposed to temperatures of around 200°C, in a process called "presecado" or "pre drying".
  3. Finally, the "drying process" per se takes place, when the yerba mate is exposed to constant temperatures of around 100°C for three hours.
3. Following the drying process, the product undergoes a milling process called "canchado", through which the leaves are crushed into pieces of 1cm, which facilitates the packing of the yerba mate for further storage.
4. Then, the leaves are kept in humidity-free warehouses for a period that goes from nine months to two years, until features such as flavour, color, and smell are fully enhanced.
5. After that, the yerba mate undergoes further grinding and mixing processes, until it is ready for packaging in bags carefully designed to keep the product free from moisture and odors.
6. Finally, yerba mate Playadito is ready for commercialization and consumption.
