= Kolashanpan =

Carbonated drink

Kolashanpan is a brand of Champagne cola carbonated beverage created by Embotelladora La Cascada S.A. It comes in either a glass bottle, plastic bottle, or a can, the most prominent of which is plastic. On their company webpage the sizes go from a small bottle of 6.5 ounces to a 3 liter bottle, at least for the ones bottled in plastic. According to the company, the main ingredients in this beverage are, "12 oz Agua Carbonatada, Azucar, Sabor Artificial, Acido Citrico Benzoato de sodio. Color Amarillo FD&C No 6." (carbonated water, sugar, artificial flavoring, citric acid sodium benzoate, and color FD&C yellow no. 6). The design on the bottle is representative of what the country looks like from a bird's eye view.

Kolashanpan is a soft drink originating in El Salvador and very popular in Central America. It is bright orange in color, with a sweet flavor similar to vanilla or strawberry bubblegum. It is found in supermarkets, convenience stores, and some restaurants outside of El Salvador in Salvadoran communities.

== Advertising ==
There was an advertisement that played in El Salvador that ties the beverage with being a Salvadoran. The video itself aired in 1984 and shows people working in the fields, with animals, people carrying items, selling in a market, and making tortillas. The video ends by saying "Kolashanpan, el sabor de El Salvador."

== Cultural effects ==
According to a dissertation by Stephanie Brock, Kolashanpan helps Salvadorans maintain "a transnational community identity as well as a salvadoreño(americano) ethnic identity." Brock says that in Houston there are many Salvadorans and Salvadoran-Americans and that by keeping items such as sodas from their native country, they can more easily adjust to living in Houston, as well as keeping in touch with their native roots. The company website lists five distribution centers in Texas, Connecticut, California, New York, and Florida.
