= Tropical Fantasy =

American soft drink

Tropical Fantasy is an American soft-drink, originally from Brooklyn, New York. Its low price of 49¢ per 21-ounce bottle led to its success in the 1990s. Tropical Fantasy was initially popular in inner city areas. The company did not employ large marketing campaigns and used simple store displays and low prices to sell its drinks. This made the product almost invisible to consumers not living in areas where the beverages were sold. Tropical Fantasy is bottled by a small family-owned soft-drink manufacturer called Brooklyn Bottling Group, which has bottled seltzers since 1936. In 1990, with its debut of the Tropical Fantasy line, the soft-drinks became an overnight success. It now bottles over $2 million each month in sales.

== Juice Cocktails ==
- Apple Juice
- Blue Raspberry
- Citrus Delight
- Fruit Punch
- Grape
- Kiwi Strawberry
- Lemon Iced Tea
- Mandarin Orange
- Mean Green Lemonade
- Passion Fruit
- Piña Colada
- Raspberry Rush
- Strawberry Lemonade
- Lemonade
- Cherry blue lemonade

== Soft Drinks ==
- Black Cherry
- Champagne Kola
- Coconut
- Cola
- Cotton Candy
- Flite
- Ginger Ale
- Golden Fruit Champagne
- Grape Drink
- Island Punch Finisher
- Kool Kombucha Kooler
- Lemon 'n Lime
- Mango
- Mountain Rush
- Orange
- Pineapple
- Watermelon
- Wild Blue Cherry
- Wild Pink Strawberry
- Sweet Tea

== African-American conspiracy theory ==
In April 1991, rumors began circulating in Black neighborhoods that the beverage was laced with a secret ingredient that would sterilize black men. The beverage quickly earned the nickname "Tropical Fanticide." The rumors claimed that the Ku Klux Klan was actually bottling the product and using the low price to attract poor citizens. Similar unfounded rumors about Klan involvement periodically have plagued the Church's Fried Chicken chain and Snapple soft drinks.

Later that year the rumor spread rapidly and provoked violence in many city neighborhoods. Attacks occurred on delivery trucks and storekeepers who stocked Tropical Fantasy. Due to these rumors and rising suspicions, sales of the beverage plummeted by 70%.

Investigations found the claims to be as preposterous. Sales recovered only after an extensive public relations campaign that included then-New York City Mayor David N. Dinkins, (who was Black) drinking a bottle of the soda for television news cameras.

By mid June 1991 the attacks had stopped and the sales had rebounded, but the dark rumors about Tropical Fantasy were not forgotten. Even today, the rumors are still circulating. Many young teenagers refer to the beverages as "Bummies" and "Nutties", mainly due to the rumor that it kills sperm. This is not however limited to the Tropical Fantasy beverage. Other beverages such as "City Club", "Top Pop", and "C&C", are ridiculed in exactly the same way.
