= Paraguayan Agricultural Development =

Paraguayan Agricultural Development (DAP) is an agricultural organization based in Paraguay. It is a large-scale project, formed by Paraguayan entrepreneurs and Argentineans in conjunction with the Moises Bertoni Foundation and the Environmental Law and Economics Institute (IDEA).

The organization evaluates economic, social and environmental factors for companies in Paraguay, ensuring that they comply with social and environmental regulations for instance, drawing up management plans and granting licenses and offering expertise on the use of agro chemicals and managing the Paraguayan environment in coordination with ideologies of sustainable development.

== See also ==
- Agriculture in Paraguay
