= Brasserie de la Couronne =

Brasserie de la Couronne, S.A.
- Industry: Beverages
- Founded: 1924
- Headquarters: Route Nationale 1, Sarthe; Port-au-Prince, Haiti
- Area served: Caribbean, United States, Canada
- Key people: Roger Jaar, Raymond Jaar
- Products: Soft drinks

Brasserie de la Couronne, S.A., is a carbonated soft drink manufacturer and the licensed bottler for the Coca-Cola Company in Haiti. It makes the popular Cola Couronne Fruit Champagne and recently added Diète Couronne Fruit Champagne, Couronne Limonade, and Diète Couronne Limonade. It bottles Coca-Cola, Sprite, Fanta, and Gladiator for the Coca-Cola Company.

== History ==
Brasserie de la Couronne was founded in 1924 and, three years later, the relationship with Coca-Cola started in 1927. It was acquired by Richard J. Forgham in the early 1950s and in turn sold to brothers Roger and Raymond Jaar in 1983. In 1986, the plant was then moved from its downtown Port-au-Prince location to a 33-acre site. Significant improvements were made to increase the plant´s productivity in 1995 where the technical infrastructure was updated, and the size of the plant was increased. It is one of the longest running companies as well as one of the largest private sector employers in Haiti today. It sponsors many sporting and cultural events in the community in Haiti throughout the year and provides support to local hospitals, associations and schools. Scholarship funds and the purchase of school supplies in Port-au-Prince and in other provinces are raised through their UTC promotions that allow consumers to help fund them.

== Economic impact ==
Nearly $16 million is expected to be invested in 2010, and $30 million over five years which could ultimately create an additional one thousand jobs. This includes improvements in the plant in Port-au-Prince; construction of a waste water treatment facility; procurement of glass, trucks and coolers; the addition of a new PET line and the upgrade of a new line to bottle juice.
