= Nativa =

Beverage sold in Argentina

- Type: Yerba mate-flavored beverage
- Manufacturer: The Coca-Cola Company
- Origin: Argentina
- Introduced: 2003
- Discontinued: 2004

Nativa Yerba Mate Inc
- Type: Yerba mate tea leaves.
- Manufacturer: Nativa Yerba Mate Inc
- Origin: United States
- Introduced: 2000
- Discontinued: available

Nativa was a carbonated beverage created by the Coca-Cola Company. It was released in November 2003 in Argentina, and discontinued in August 2004. The flavor of this drink was Yerba mate.

The odd choice of flavor was based on the Argentine tradition of drinking mate, which also was the reason of the naming of the brand "Nativa" (native).

Not to be confused with Nativa Yerba Mate, USPTO trademarked brand of loose-leaf yerba mate from Brazil which is still in existence.
