= Cannabis in Paraguay =

Cannabis in Paraguay is illegal, but the nation is one of the world's largest producers of cannabis; possession of 10 grams or less was decriminalized in 1988. It is the second-largest cannabis producer in Latin America, following Mexico. Paraguay is the main source of cannabis for Brazil, Argentina, Uruguay, and Chile, and produced 5900 metric tons per year per a 2008 report.

Most of the cannabis grown in Paraguay is destined for the preparation of pressed marijuana, so it is mixed with various glues to mask the odor at border controls, and is sold in brick form (ladrillo) throughout South America.

== Cultivation ==
Paraguay's fertile red soil is conducive to cannabis growth, yielding 6,600 pounds per hectare, and in some plots allowing multiple harvests in one year.

== Legalizations movements ==
In December 2014, a Paraguayan legislator proposed a bill to decriminalize possession and use of marijuana, and possession of no more than 30 plants. In early 2015, Senator Blas Llano stated his support for legalization, making him the highest-ranking Paraguayan politician to do so.

== Enforcement ==
Law N° 1.340 (Art. 30) of 1988, exempted from punishment those in possession of a maximum of 10 grams of marijuana for personal consumption.
