= 1982–83 Paraguay floods =

Natural disaster in Paraguay

Coordinates: 25.266°S 57.666°W

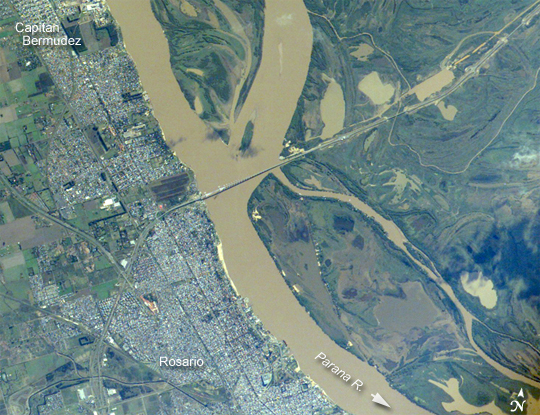
Paraná River

The 1982–83 Paraguay floods refers to major flooding that primarily affected the Paraná River basin in the La Plata Basin of Paraguay in fall of 1982 and beginning of 1983. The flooding was caused by El Niño and it also affected parts of Brazil, Argentina and Bolivia. Although only 170 were killed as a direct result of the floods, 600,000 people were evacuated from their homes and in the end the damage caused around $3 billion. Affecting an estimate of 85,000 people solely in Paraguay, the flood waters had risen from an average of 2.6 meters to above 9 meters. This resulted in several national along with international voluntary agencies donating over $70,000.

The floods caused a great deal of damage to housing, prompting a structural redesign in building in Paraguay in the aftermath. Houses were constructed and designed to provide safe shelter, even if the floods submerged single story houses.
