= Cola Lacaye =

Soft drink from Haiti

- Type: Various fruit flavors
- Manufacturer: Brooklyn Bottling Group
- Introduced: 1977

Cola Lacaye is a soft drink from Haiti founded by Rigobert Richardson in 1977. Today, Cola Lacaye soda is manufactured and distributed by The Brooklyn Bottling Group, which manufactures, distributes, and imports various Caribbean-based soft drinks and food. Cola Lacaye comes in three island flavors; Fruit Cola, Fruit Champagne and Banana. Cola Lacaye is available in 12oz bottles and 2 liter bottles. Cola Lacaye has become part of the Haitian American cultural dining experience, especially for Rigobert's son, Ryan Richardson.

== See also ==
- List of soft drinks by country
