= Brooklyn Bottling Group =

Beverage and food company in the US

The Brooklyn Bottling Group is one of the largest independently owned beverage and food companies in the United States. Founded by Jack Miller in 1936, the company started out by selling seltzers and syrups door to door in Brooklyn neighborhoods. The second generation, Arnold Miller, acquired the first bottling facility and the company began to produce soft drinks in 1947. In its third generation, Eric Miller has expanded the company's line up to include fruit juices.

The Brooklyn Bottling Group bottling facility is based in Milton, New York and has warehouses and distribution centers in Brooklyn, Miami, Orlando and Atlanta. The company manufactures, distributes, imports and sells over 50 brands of soft drinks, juices, food and household items. Its products ship to 23 states, primarily on the East Coast of the United States.

The company was once involved in a controversy with its soft-drink line "Tropical Fantasy" in the early 1990s. In April 1991 a rumor spread throughout black neighborhoods that the Ku Klux Klan secretly owned the company and its line of Tropical Fantasy soft drinks would sterilize black men. The rumors were spread through flyers and were later found to be false.

== Drinks ==
- Squeez'r Juices and Teas
- Nature's Own Fresh Pressed Juices
- Tropical Fantasy Juices, Soft Drinks, Bottled Water and Energy Drinks
- Best Health Spring Water, Seltzer, and Soft Drinks
- D & G Jamaican Soft Drinks
- Vitamalt non alcoholic malt beverage
- Postobon Colombian Soft Drinks
- Pony Malta non alcoholic Malt beverage
- Country Club Soft Drinks from Dominican Republic
- Cola Lacaye from Haiti
- Tropical Rhythms juices

== Malt beverages ==
- Ballantine Ale
- Country Club Malt Liquor
- Private Stock Malt Liquor
- Vitamalt (non alcoholic)
- Pony Malta (non alcoholic)

== See also ==
- List of bottling companies
