= SM Jaleel =

SM Jaleel & Company Limited
- Type: Private
- Industry: Beverages
- Founded: San Fernando, Trinidad and Tobago - 1924
- Founder: Sheik Mohameed Jaleel
- Headquarters: South Oropouche, Trinidad and Tobago
- Area served: Worldwide
- Key people: Aleem Mohammed (Chairman)
- Website: www.smjaleel.net

SM Jaleel & Company Ltd, also known as SMJ, is the largest manufacturer of non alcoholic drinks in the English speaking Caribbean. Since inception in 1924 their portfolio of beverages are distributed to over 60 countries worldwide.

== Business Segment ==
SMJ’s products include a wide array of soft drinks, fruit juices, purified and flavoured water, energy drinks, and other fruit flavoured beverages.

SMJ's blow molding facility is the largest in the Caribbean where they manufacture their own PET bottles in different shapes and sizes for their numerous products.

The company was also the first in the world, in conjunction with Reynolds Metals Company, to fill fruit juices in aluminum cans using nitrogen technology in the 1980s. This eliminated the need for artificial preservatives in the product.

Currently, SMJ’s products are found in over half a million wholesale and retail stores worldwide, including Walmart and other international retailers. The company has more than 2,000 employees in five continents.

== History ==
S.M. Jaleel was founded in 1924 by Sheik Mohameed Jaleel, and was located at the corner of Keate and Prince Alfred Streets in San Fernando, Trinidad and Tobago with a staff of 25.

History and Timeline

1930	Jaleel Beverages S.M. Jaleel’s factory moved to Sheik Mohammed Jaleel’s home at 7 Prince Alfred Street in San Fernando, Trinidad and Tobago. The first product was launched, “Jaleel Beverages” and was distributed using traditional horses and carts.
1938	Wonder and Applette Launched Just before World War II “Wonder” and “Applette” brands were launched.
1938	Joe Luis Punch Launched When Joe Luis the world heavyweight champion, was brought to Trinidad by SMJ, “Joe Luis Punch” was developed in his honour.
1950	Red Spot Launched The renowned “Red Spot” brand was developed. Automated lines were introduced, and there were 10 trucks in the company’s fleet. Also in this year, SMJ’s factory was commissioned in Grenada.
1968	Dixi Cola Launched The “Dixie Cola” brand was launched.
1975	Mr. Shaffikool Mohammed SMJ sold to family member Mr. Shaffikool Mohammed.
1977	Company’s founder dies Sheik Mohammed Jaleel, the company’s founder, dies.
1980	New Chairman Appointed Dr. Aleem Mohammed took the position of Chairman and CEO of S.M. Jaleel & Co. Ltd. This year was also significant as S.M. Jaleel’s factory moved into The Otaheite Industrial Estate in South Trinidad, and this remains the headquarters of the Company.
1981	Cole Cold Launched Launch of the Cole Cold range of soft drinks in cans.
1982	Pear-D Launched Launch of Pear-D in cans, which was positioned as the flagship of the Cole Cold brand. Additionally, in this year SMJ was awarded the 7-UP franchise for Trinidad and Tobago.
1983	Fruta Juice Drinks Launched Launch of the Fruta range of juices in cans.
1984	Jaliter The 2L range of soft drinks was introduced under the name Jaliter.
1986	Caribbean Cool Drinks Launched in the UK Caribbean Cool drinks launched in the United Kingdom.
1987	Capri Sun Franchised SMJ was appointed Caribbean Franchise Holders for Capri Sun in 1L PET packaging.
1987	Cadbury Schweppes Franchised SMJ was awarded the Cadbury-Schweppes franchise for the manufacture and distribution of Schweppes soft drink products throughout the Caribbean Market.
1988	Market shares jump SMJ’s market share jumped from 1 percent to 30 percent in 18 months!
1992	Distributing Pepsi SMJ Beverages UK Limited was incorporated for the distribution of SMJ’s brands in the UK.
1993	Chubby Soft Drinks Launched The launch of SMJ’s flagship brand Chubby, a carbonated range of soft drinks targeted to children 4 to 9 years old in a special patented PET package.
1996	Exporter of the Year Award SMJ cops five( 5) Prime Minister Exporter of the Year awards in Trinidad and Tobago, including largest exporter in the non-petroleum sector.
1997	Busta Soft Drinks Launched Launch of Busta soft drink range in PET bottles
1997	Subsidiary in Guyana Incorporated Guyana Beverages was incorporated for distribution of all SMJ brands.
1997	Subsidiary in Barbados Launched SMJ and Goddard Enterprises formed a joint venture to buy BIM Beverages in Barbados. The Busta and Chubby brands were bottled in Barbados by SMJ Beverages Barbados.
1999	Subsidiary in Jamaica Launched Jamaica Beverages Ltd. opens operations in Kingston and Montego Bay Jamaica, to distribute Chubby and Busta.
1999	Red Spot Relaunched Red Spot re-launched to commemorate 75th Anniversary.
1999	Chubby Launched in Canada SMJ signs a franchise agreement with Cott Corporation for Chubby.
1999	Haiti Beverages Launched Joint venture between SMJ and Culligan in Haiti for the distribution of Busta, Chubby and Fruta.
1999	Chubby Launched in Brazil Joint venture between SMJ and Empresa Brasileria de Distribuicao Ltda for distribution of Chubby in Brazil.
1999	Chubby Launched in Mexico Franchise agreement with Mundet S.A. de CV for Chubby in Mexico.
2000	S.M.J. Beverages St. Lucia Ltd. Launched SMJ’s plant was opened in Vieux Fort, St. Lucia, producing carbonated soft drinks in PET bottles. The Chubby and Busta brands were bottled in St. Lucia to supply the islands in the Organization of the Eastern Caribbean, Dominica, St. Vincent & The Grenadines, Grenada, St. Kitts and Antigua.
2000	Viva Flavoured Sparkling Water Launched The Viva range of flavoured sparkling waters was launched.
2000	Innovation Award SMJ won the Prime Minister’s award for Innovation in Trinidad and Tobago.
2004	Fruta Kool Kidz Juice Drinks Launched The Fruta Kool Kidz brand was launched in Tetra Pak packaging in a 200ml pack, which focused on offering a range of juice drinks to kids between the ages of 4 and 11 years old.
2004	Chubby Saudi Arabia Launched Mohammed Abdul Aleem and Partners started operations to bottle and distribute Chubby in Damam Saudi Arabia, and for export to other Middle Eastern countries.
2006	Oasis Premium Bottled Water Launched Oasis premium bottled water was launched.
2007	Fruta Juice Drinks in PET Launched Fruta juice drinks were launched in plastic bottles using hot-fill technology.
2007	Caribbean Cool Drinks in PET Launched The Caribbean Cool drink range was re-launched in plastic bottles using hot-fill technology.
2008	Fruta Juice Drinks launched in Tetra Pak Launched Fruta was launched in 250ml Tetra Pak packaging.
2008	SMJ Acquires Trinidad Fruit Juice Range SMJ acquired Trinidad Fruit Juice range of brands from Co-Operative Citrus Growers’ Association (CCGA).
2009	Tampico Drinks SMJ was awarded the licence to produce Tampico juice drinks in the English-speaking Caribbean region.
2009	Fruta Juice Drinks - 1 Litre Launched Fruta 1L range was developed
2009	Turbo Energy Drink In 2009 SMJ entered the energy drink market with Turbo Energy Drink.
2009	Chubby Launched in South Africa SMJ distributes Chubby in South Africa.
2010	Maaee Water Launched SMJ Asia Limited was formed in India, producing and distributing the Maaee brand of water
2012	SMJ Acquires Jamaica Citrus Growers Limited In 2012, SMJ acquired the assets of Jamaica Citrus Growers Limited, a manufacturer of fruit juices in Jamaica that was in receivership.

Locations

SM Jaleel's headquarters reside at the Otaheite Industrial Estate in South Oropouche, Trinidad and Tobago. There are subsidiary offices in Jamaica, Barbados, Suriname, Guyana, St. Lucia, South Africa and Asia.

== Products Manufactured and Distributed by SMJ ==
=== Juices & Juice Drinks ===
- Fruta
- Fruta Kool Kidz
- Caribbean Cool
- Trinidad Juices
- Tampico
- Trinidad Fresh

Carbonated soft drinks

- American Classic
- Busta
- Chubby
- Cole Cold
- Seagrams

Water

- Cool Runnings
- Island Mist
- Mt. Pelier
- Oasis
- Viva

Energy drinks

- Turbo Energy Drink

Isotonic drinks

- Altitude

Iced teas

- Island Fusion

=== Consideration for the Environment ===
- Approximately 10% of all virgin (rejected) bottles before being filled are sterilized and re-injected into the line.
- Re-use of the liners that come with the pallets of empty cans, for lining the sugar pallets, and the stacked finished product.
- Collection of wasted water in special pipe lines to re-use for cooling equipment on the plant.
- Since 2004 SMJ has been making PET bottles lighter in weight by using less material in its composition to create less post consumer waste.
- Sale of all post industrial material (returned bottles, cans and plastic), cardboard, pallets and metal drums to recycling companies.
- Use of shredding machines both in Barbados, which shred returned plastic (PET) bottles (post consumption). The shredded plastic is packed in sacks and exported to international recycling companies. The PET flakes are used by these companies to make various things like carpeting, wall insulation, and polyester T-shirts.
- Purchase of large quantities of oranges and grapefruit from local farmers for use in the freshly squeezed juice products (for Trinidad Juices - Not from concentrate). The peel from these fruits are processed to make animal feed.
