= Ironbeer =

Cuban soft drink

Ironbeer is a soft drink that originated in Cuba in 1917 and was created by Manuel Rabanal. It has been described as tasting like "a fruitier Dr Pepper" or like Ironport soda. After Fidel Castro became Cuba's dictator and oversaw nationalization of private property in 1960, "Inversiones Rabanal" run by Jesus Larrazabal (husband of Teresa Rabanal – Manuel's daughter) along with the Ironbeer of Cuba families (Rabanal, Larrazabal, Rojas) were exiled and settled in Miami.

The U.S. version of Ironbeer Softdrink, without the 500 pounds (230 kg) bell on logo, is owned and operated by the Blanco Family.

== History ==
In 1991, Ironbeer's sister company, Sunshine Bottling, got into a business venture with Tropicana, which was looking for a new bottling company. Ironbeer then invested heavily into expanding Sunshine Bottling Co. to get it ready for the demands of this really enormous contract.

Subsequently, Tropicana made a demand about the percentage of air in each can of their orange juice—an impossible demand, industry experts said, and one outside the terms of their contract—and extricated themselves from it.

Ironbeer's CEO, Pedro Blanco Sr., sued Tropicana and eventually won a considerable sum for production costs and damages, but not before the huge legal bills sent Ironbeer into bankruptcy court. They emerged from bankruptcy in 1999.

The soft drink, along with a few others and the Sunchy line of juices, is bottled in Miami by Sunshine Bottling Company. The company is owned and operated by president and CEO Carlos Blanco Sr.; Pedro Blanco Sr. has since died.

The labels on Ironbeer cans give the following story about the soda's origins:

On a Summer's afternoon, in 1917, a mule-drawn, wooden wagon arrived at a popular cafeteria in Havana, Cuba. It delivered the first four cases of a new soft drink that would soon be called "The National Beverage." Now, more than 80 years later, IRONBEER is still enjoyed for its refreshing flavor with just a hint of island spices. A lot can change over the years—but not the original flavor of IRONBEER!

== Legacy ==
In 2019, a beer inspired by the original Ironbeer was launched by Miami-based microbrewery Beat Culture Brewery; the beer was called Iron Bier. Ironbeer imagery has also been appropriated by artists and incorporated into the fine arts, most notably by Cuban-American artist Ric Garcia.
