= Cola Couronne =

Soft drink from Haiti

- A bottle of Cola Couronne
- Type: Fruit Champagne
- Manufacturer: Brasserie de la Couronne
- Origin: Haiti
- Introduced: 1924
- Color: Gold

Cola Couronne (French: crown cola), is the oldest manufactured soft drink from Haiti by Brasserie de la Couronne S.A. It is arguably the country's most well-liked soda, as it is a staple beverage for Haitians and those abroad. In Haiti, Cola Couronne is sold in tall glass bottles or plastic bottles, as the amount of aluminum required to can the beverage does not exist in Haiti. However, canned Cola Couronne is produced in its U.S. plant in Miami, called Universal Beverages, LLC. As a result, cans are readily available in South Florida and other parts of the U.S. and Canada with a sizable population of Haitians, such as Montreal. In the Dominican Republic Cola Couronne is produced by the Coca-Cola company in Santo Domingo.

Each can of Couronne has 120 calories and 31 grams of sugar. The sodium level is 45 mg, equal to the sodium level of American Coca-Cola.

== See also ==
- List of soft drinks by country
