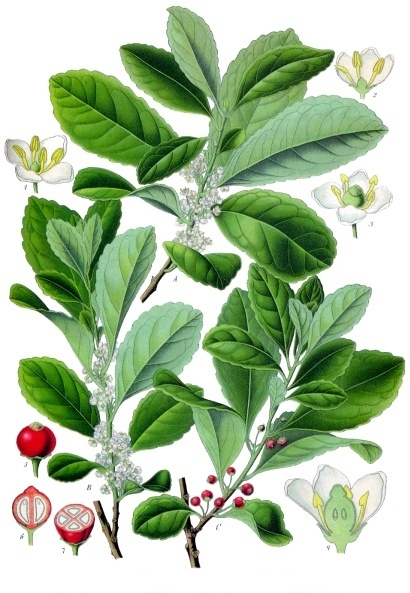

Conservation status
- Near Threatened (IUCN 3.1)

Scientific classification
- Kingdom: Plantae
- Clade: Embryophytes
- Clade: Tracheophytes
- Clade: Angiosperms
- Clade: Eudicots
- Clade: Asterids
- Order: Aquifoliales
- Family: Aquifoliaceae
- Genus: Ilex
- Species: I. paraguariensis

Binomial name
- Ilex paraguariensis A.St.-Hil.
- Native range of Ilex paraguaiensis

= Yerba mate =

South American holly plant

Yerba mate or yerba maté (/ˈjɜːrbə ˈmɑːteɪ/ YUR-bə MAH-tay), Ilex paraguariensis, is a plant species of the holly genus native to South America. The leaves of the plant can be steeped in hot water to make a beverage known as mate. Brewed cold, it is used to make tereré. Both the plant and the beverage contain caffeine.

The indigenous Guaraní and some Tupi communities (whose territory covered modern Paraguay) first cultivated and consumed yerba mate prior to European colonization of the Americas. Its consumption was exclusive to the natives of two regions of the territory that became Paraguay, specifically the departments of Amambay and Alto Paraná. After the Jesuits discovered its commercialization potential, yerba mate became widespread throughout the province and even elsewhere in the Spanish Crown. The plant was named by the French botanist Augustin Saint-Hilaire.

Mate is traditionally consumed in central and southern regions of South America, primarily in Paraguay, as well as in Argentina, Uruguay, Southern Brazil, the Gran Chaco of Bolivia, and Southern Chile. It has also become popular in the Druze and Alawite community in the Levant, especially in Syria and Lebanon, where it is imported from Paraguay and Argentina, thanks to 19th-century Syrian immigrants to Argentina. Yerba mate can be found worldwide in various energy drinks as well as being sold as a bottled or canned iced drink.

== Name and pronunciation ==
The name given to the plant in the Guaraní language (of the indigenous people who first used mate) is kaʼa, which has the same meaning as 'herb'. Congonha, in Portuguese, a term describing several herb species, is derived from the Tupí expression kõ'gõi, meaning something like 'what keeps us alive', but is rarely used nowadays. Mate is from the Quechua mati, a word that means 'container for a drink' and 'infusion of an herb', as well as 'gourd'. The word mate is used in modern Portuguese and Spanish.

The pronunciation of yerba mate in Spanish is [ˈɟʝeɾβa ˈmate], with the stress on the first syllable of mate. The word yerba is Spanish for 'herb', a variant spelling of hierba used throughout Latin America. Yerba may be understood as 'herb', but also as 'grass' or 'weed'. In Argentina and Uruguay, yerba refers exclusively to the yerba mate plant. Yerba mate, therefore, literally means the 'gourd herb'; i.e., the herb one drinks from a gourd.

The Portuguese name for the plant is pronounced [ˈɛɾvɐ ˈmate] or [ˈɛɾvɐ ˈmatʃi] in the areas of traditional consumption. The drinks are usually called chimarrão [ʃimaˈʁɐ̃w] (hot; traditionally served in a gourd), tereré [teɾeˈɾɛ] (cold; traditionally served in a bull horn), or chá mate [ˈʃa ˈmate] (hot or cold; lit. 'mate tea', served in cups or glasses). While chá mate is made with roasted leaves, the other drinks are made with raw or lightly toasted green leaves, and are very popular in the south and center-west of the country. Most people, colloquially, call both the plant and the beverage by the word mate.

In English, both the spellings mate and maté are used to refer to the plant or the beverage. The acute accent over the final '-e' was likely added by analogy with words of French origin like café, not to mark stress but to indicate that the '-e' is not silent as it is in the English word mate (partner or friend); indeed French also uses the spelling maté with an accent. In Spanish, the spelling maté is an unrelated word meaning 'I killed', a conjugation of the verb matar.

== Description ==
Ilex paraguariensis begins as a shrub and then matures to a tree, growing up to 15 meters (50 ft) tall. The leaves are evergreen, 7–110 millimeters (1/4–4 3/8 in) long and 30–55 millimeters (1 1/8–2 1/8 in) wide, with serrated margins. The leaves are often called yerba (Spanish) or erva (Portuguese), both of which mean "herb". They contain caffeine (known in some parts of the world as mateine) and related xanthine alkaloids, and are harvested commercially.

The flowers are small and greenish-white with four petals. The fruit is a red drupe 4–6 millimeters (5/32–1/4 in) in diameter.

Junqueira 2001 reported extrafloral nectaries on its leaves.

== History ==
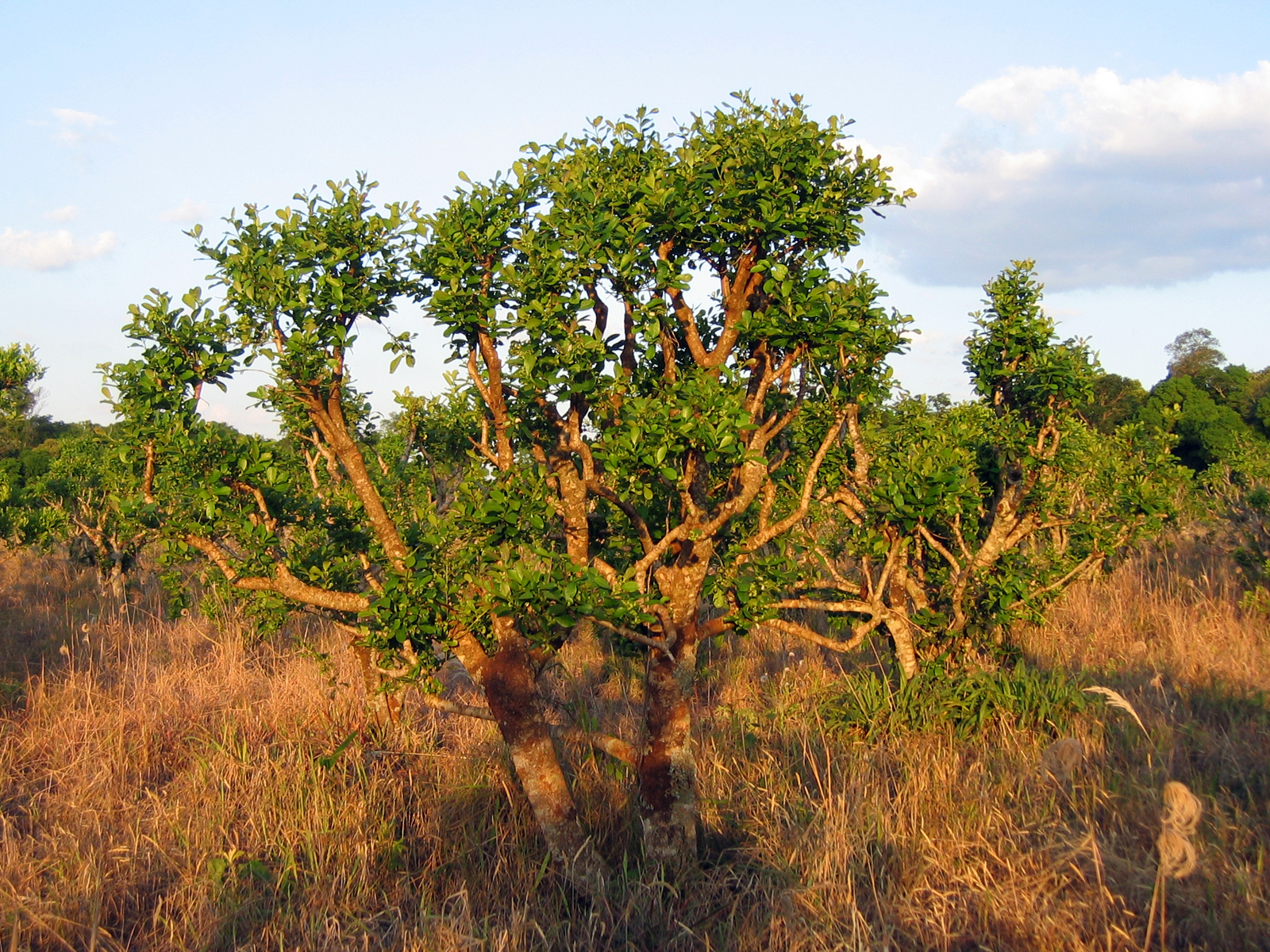
Yerba mate growing in the wild

Mate was first consumed by the indigenous Guaraní people and also spread in the Tupí people that lived in the departments of Amambay and Alto Paraná the territory of Paraguay. Its consumption became widespread during European colonization, particularly in the Spanish colony of Paraguay in the late 16th century, among both Spanish settlers and indigenous Guaraní, who had, to some extent before the Spanish arrival, consumed it. This widespread consumption turned it into Paraguay's main commodity above other wares, such as tobacco, and the labour of indigenous peoples was used to harvest wild stands.

In the mid-17th century, Jesuits managed to domesticate the plant and establish plantations in their Indian reductions in Misiones, Argentina, sparking severe competition with the Paraguayan harvesters of wild stands. It is here when the plant began its incursion into other non-Paraguayan territories. After their expulsion in the 1770s, their plantations fell into decay, as did their domestication secrets. The industry continued to be of prime importance for the Paraguayan economy after independence, but development in benefit of the Paraguayan state halted after the War of the Triple Alliance (1864–1870) that devastated the country both economically and demographically. Some regions with mate plantations in Paraguay became Argentine territory.

Brazil then became the largest producer of mate. In Brazilian and Argentine projects in the late 19th and early 20th centuries, the plant was domesticated once again, opening the way for plantation systems. When Brazilian entrepreneurs turned their attention to coffee in the 1930s, Argentina, which had long been the prime consumer, took over as the largest producer, resurrecting the economy in Misiones Province, where the Jesuits had once had most of their plantations. For years, the status of largest producer shifted between Brazil and Argentina. Today, Brazil is the largest producer, with 53%, followed by Argentina, 37%, and Paraguay, 10%.

In the city of Campo Largo, state of Paraná, Brazil, there is a Mate Historic Park (Portuguese: Parque Histórico do Mate), funded by the state government to educate people on the sustainable harvesting methods needed to maintain the integrity and vitality of the oldest wild forests of mate in the world. As of June 2014, however, the park is closed to public visitation.

== Cultivation ==
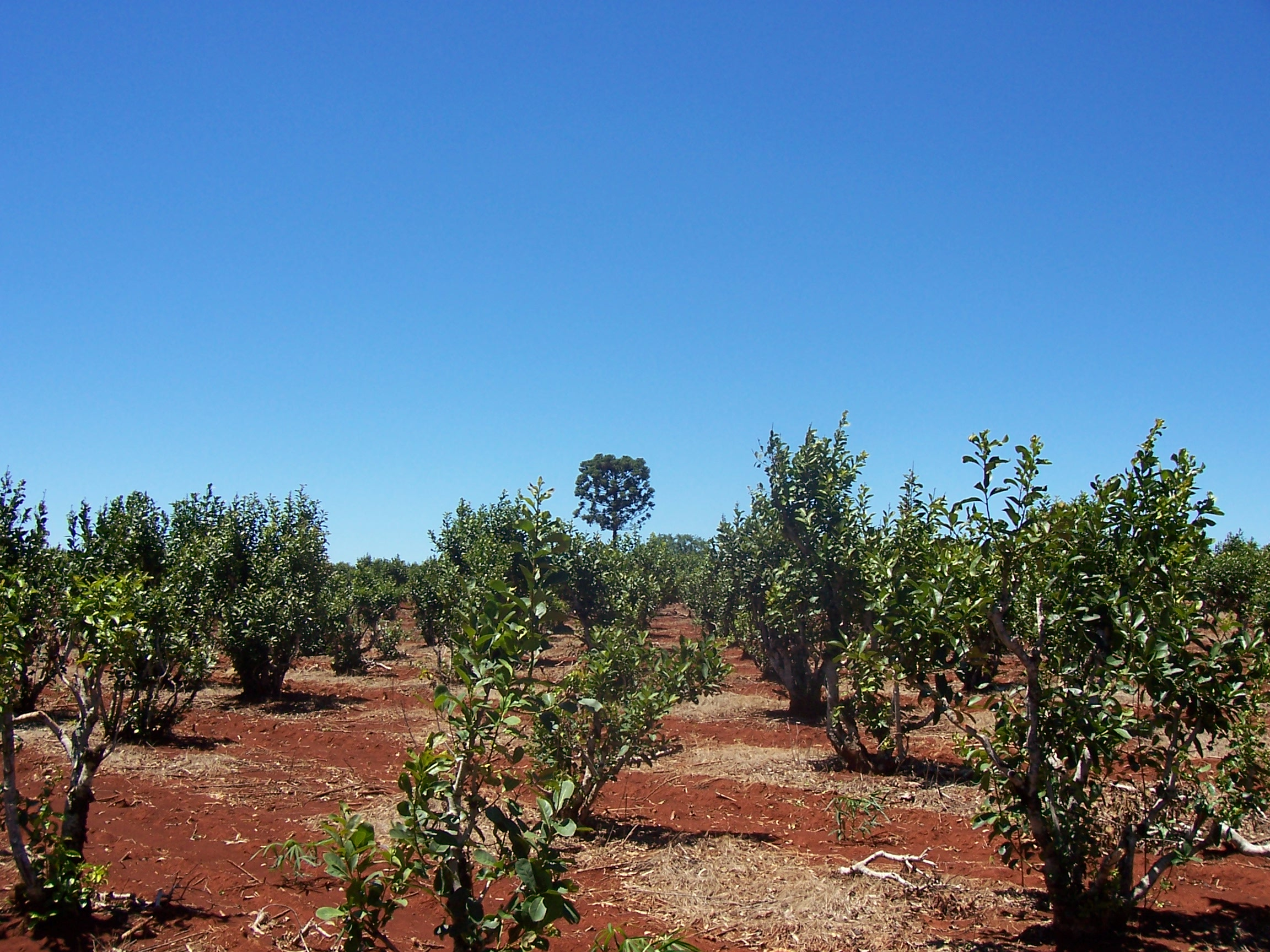
Plantation in Misiones, Argentina

The yerba mate plant is grown and processed in its native regions of South America, specifically in Paraguay, some parts of northern Argentina (Misiones), Uruguay, and southern Brazil (Rio Grande do Sul, Santa Catarina, Paraná, and Mato Grosso do Sul). Cultivators are known as yerbateros (Spanish) or ervateiros (Brazilian Portuguese).

Seeds used to germinate new plants are harvested after they have turned dark purple, typically from January to April. After harvest, they are submerged in water in order to eliminate floating non-viable seeds and detritus like twigs, leaves, etc. New plants are started between March and May. For plants established in pots, transplanting takes place April through September. Plants with bare roots are transplanted only during the months of June and July.

Many of the natural enemies of yerba mate are difficult to control in plantation settings. Insect pests include Gyropsylla spegazziniana, a true bug that lays eggs in the branches; Hedyphates betulinus, a type of beetle that weakens the tree and makes it more susceptible to mold and mildew; Perigonia lusca, a moth whose larvae eat the leaves; and several species of mites. P. lusca may be controlled with a nuclear polyhedrosis virus used as a biopesticide. This was first applied in 1992.

When I. paraguariensis is harvested, the branches are often dried by a wood fire, imparting a smoky flavor. The strength of the flavor, caffeine levels, and other nutrients can vary depending on whether it is a male or female plant. Female plants tend to be milder in flavor and lower in caffeine. They are also relatively scarce in the areas where yerba mate is planted and cultivated.

According to Food and Agriculture Organization in 2012, Brazil is the biggest producer of mate in the world with 513,256 tonnes (565,768 short tons) (58%), followed by Argentina with 290,000 tonnes (320,000 short tons) (32%) and Paraguay with 85,490 tonnes (94,240 short tons) (10%).

== Use as a beverage ==
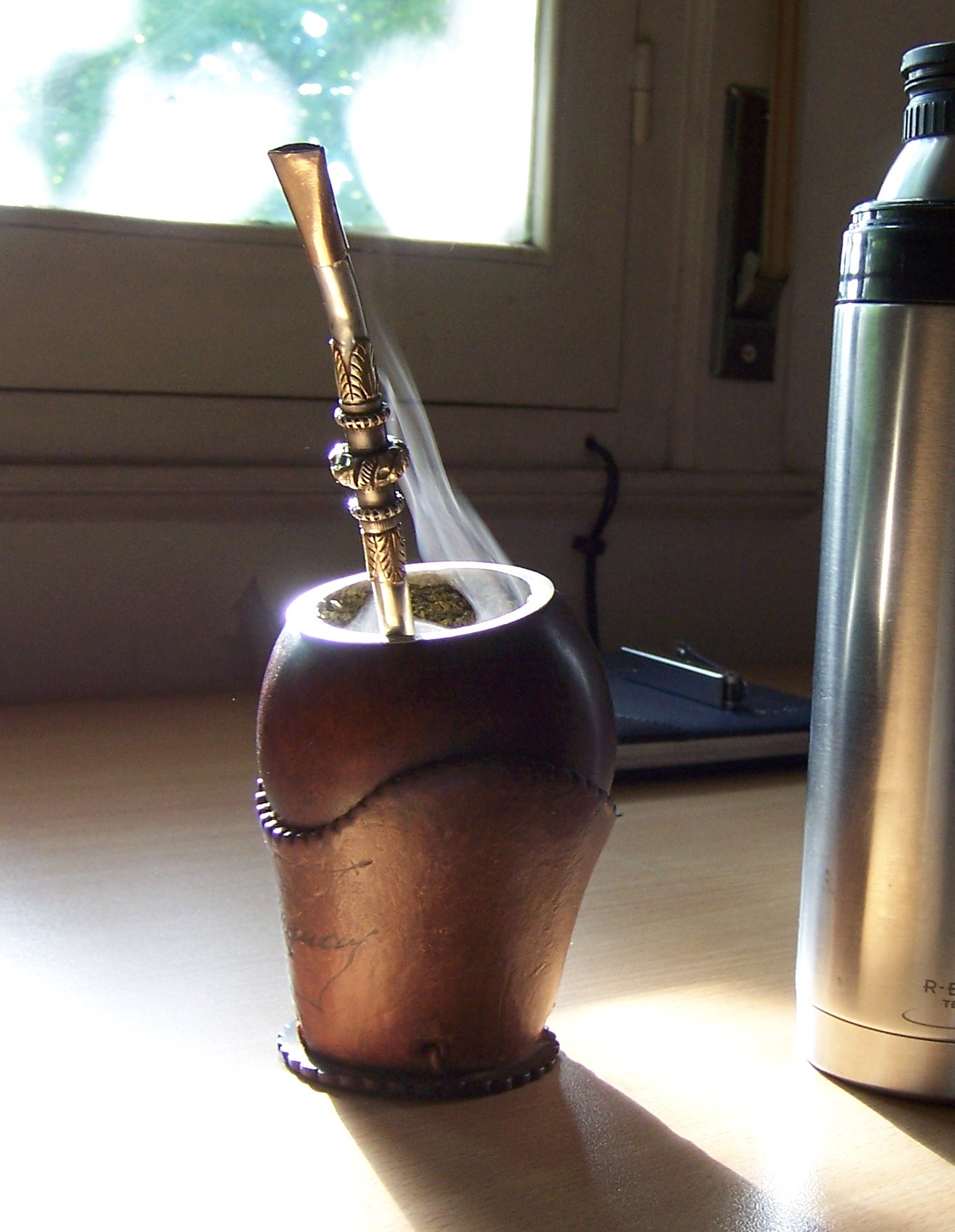
Steaming mate infusion in a cup that resembles a gourd, the customary vessel

The infusion, called mate in Spanish-speaking countries and chimarrão in Brazil, is prepared by filling a container, traditionally a small, hollowed-out gourd (described below), up to three-quarters full with dry leaves (and twigs) of I. paraguariensis, and filling it up with water at a temperature of 70–80 °C (160–175 °F), hot but not boiling. Sugar may or may not be added. The infusion may also be prepared with cold water, in which case it is known as tereré.

Drinking mate is a common social practice in Paraguay, Uruguay, Argentina, Southern Brazil, and Southern Chile among people of all ages, and is often a communal ritual following customary rules. Friends and family members share from the same container, traditionally a hollow gourd (also called a guampa, porongo, or simply mate in Spanish, a cabaça or cuia in Portuguese, or a zucca in Italian), and drink through the same wooden or metal straw (a bombilla in Spanish or bomba in Portuguese). The gourd is given by the brewer to each person, often in a circle, in turns. The recipient drinks the few mouthfuls in the container, and then returns the mate to the brewer, who refills it and passes it to the next person in clockwise order. The recipient is not supposed to give thanks until they are done drinking the beverage, and if they do, they will not be served any more mates. Although traditionally made from a hollowed calabash gourd, these days mate "gourds" are produced from a variety of materials including wood, glass, bull horns, ceramic, and silicone.

In the same way as people meet for tea or coffee, friends often gather and drink mate (matear) in Paraguay, Argentina, Southern Brazil, Uruguay, and Southern Chile. In warm weather the hot water is sometimes replaced by lemonade.

Yerba mate is most popular in Paraguay and Uruguay, where people are seen walking the streets carrying the mate and often a termo (thermal vacuum flask) in their arms. In Argentina, 5 kg (11 lb) of yerba mate is consumed annually per capita; in Uruguay, the largest consumer, consumption is 10 kg (22 lb). The amount of herb used to prepare the infusion is much greater than that used for tea and other beverages, which accounts for the large weights.

The flavor of brewed mate resembles an infusion of vegetables, herbs, and grass and is reminiscent of some varieties of green tea. Some consider the flavor to be very agreeable, but it is generally bitter if steeped in hot water. Sweetened and flavored mate is also sold, in which the mate leaves are blended with other herbs (such as peppermint) or citrus rind.

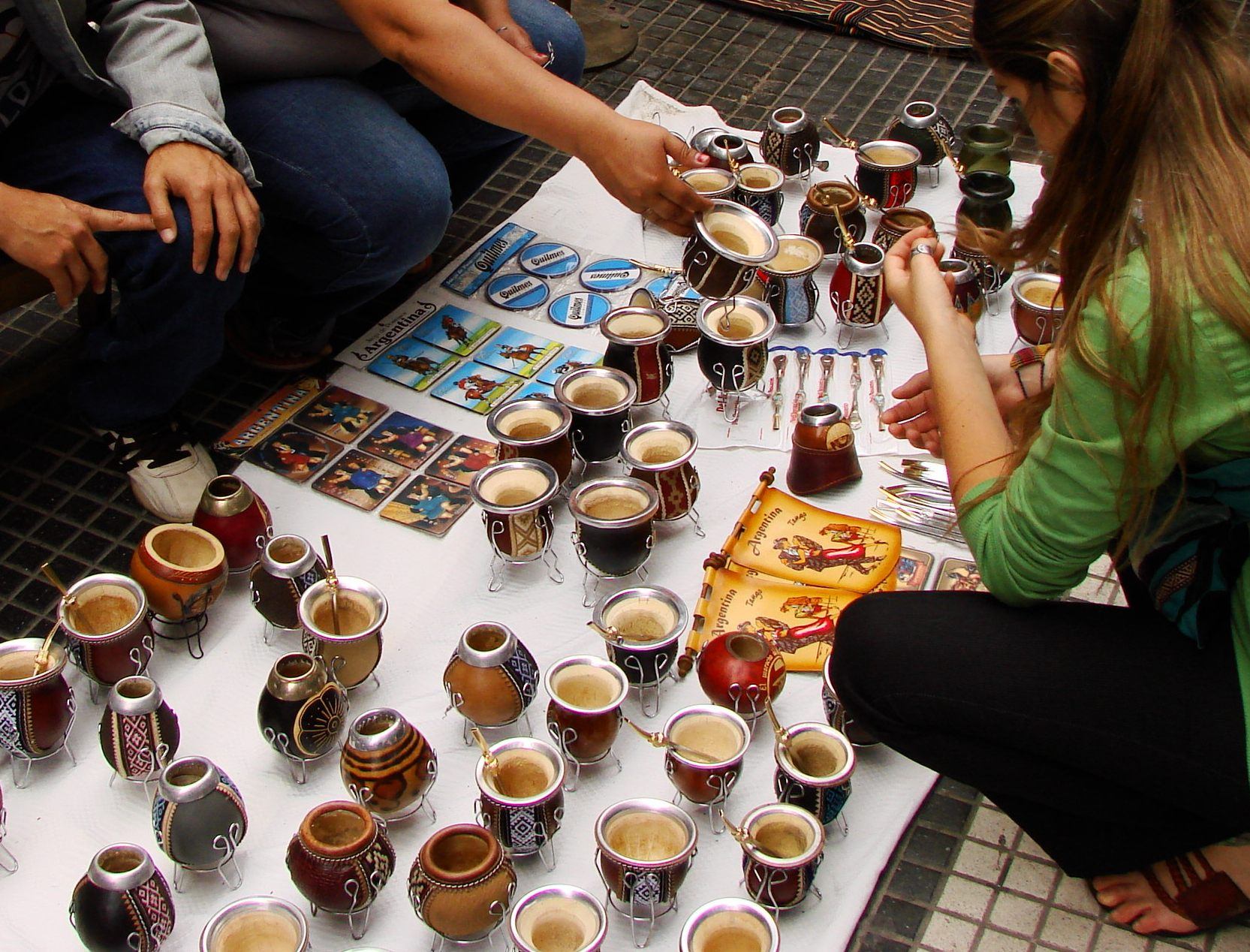
Selection of yerba mate gourds and bombillas at a street vendor in Buenos Aires, Argentina

In Paraguay, Brazil, and Argentina, a version of mate known as mate cocido (or just mate or cocido) in Paraguay and chá mate in Brazil is sold in teabags and in a loose-leaf form. It is often served sweetened in specialized shops or on the street, either hot or iced, pure or with fruit juice (especially lime, known in Brazil as limão) or milk. In Paraguay, Argentina, and Southern Brazil, this is commonly consumed for breakfast or in a café for afternoon tea, often with a selection of sweet pastries (facturas).

An iced, sweetened version of mate cocido is sold as an uncarbonated soft drink, with or without fruit flavoring. In Brazil, this cold version of chá mate is especially popular in the south and southeast regions, and can easily be found in retail stores in the same cooler as other soft drinks. Mate batido, which is toasted, has less of a bitter flavor and more of a spicy fragrance. Mate batido becomes creamy when shaken and is more popular in the coastal cities of Brazil, as opposed to the far southern states, where it is more commonly consumed in the traditional way (green, with a silver straw from a shared gourd), and called chimarrão (cimarrón in Spanish, particularly Argentine Spanish).

In Paraguay, Southern Brazil (Mato Grosso do Sul, west of São Paulo and Paraná), and the Argentine littoral, a mate infusion, called tereré in Spanish and Portuguese or sometimes tererê in Gaúcho, Caipira and Sulista Portuguese, is also consumed as a cold or iced beverage, usually sucked out of a horn cup called a guampa with a bombilla. The Guarani drank it in this format, but without ice, as they lacked the technology to create or store it. Thus, tereré is accredited to be the first and original way of consuming mate. Tereré can be prepared with cold water (the most common way in Paraguay and Brazil) or fruit juice (the most common way in Argentina). The version with water is more bitter; fruit juice acts as a sweetener (in Brazil, this is usually avoided with the addition of table sugar). Medicinal or culinary herbs, known as yuyos (weeds), may be crushed with a pestle and mortar and added to the water for taste or medicinal reasons.

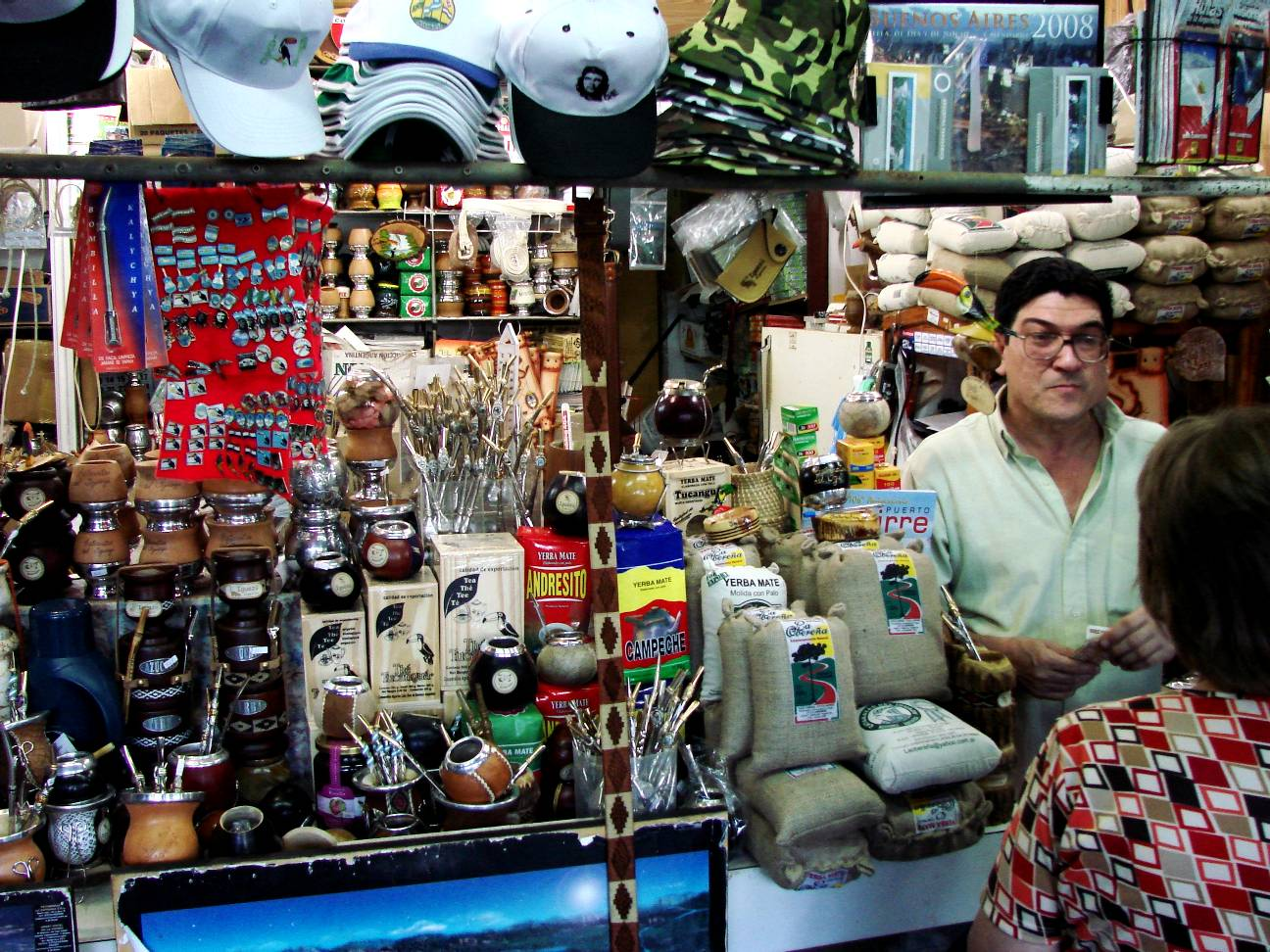
Yerba mate shop, Puerto Iguazu, Argentina

Paraguayans have a tradition of mixing mate with crushed leaves, stems, and flowers of the plant known as flor de agosto (the flower of August, plants of the genus Senecio, particularly Senecio grisebachii), which contain pyrrolizidine alkaloids. Modifying mate in this fashion is potentially toxic, as these alkaloids can cause veno-occlusive disease, a rare condition of the liver which results in liver failure due to progressive occlusion of the small venous channels.

Mate has also become very popular outside of South America. In the tiny hamlet of Groot Marico, North West Province, South Africa, mate was introduced to the local tourism office by the returning descendants of the Boers, who in 1902 had emigrated to Patagonia in Argentina after losing the Anglo Boer War. It is also commonly consumed in Lebanon, Syria, and some other parts of the Middle East, mainly by Druze and Alawite people. Most of its popularity outside South America is a result of historical emigration to South America and subsequent return. It is consumed worldwide by expatriates from the Southern Cone.

Materva is a sweet, carbonated soft drink based on yerba mate. Developed in Cuba in 1920, and produced since the 1960s in Miami, Florida, it is a staple of the Cuban culture in Miami.

=== Chemical composition and properties ===
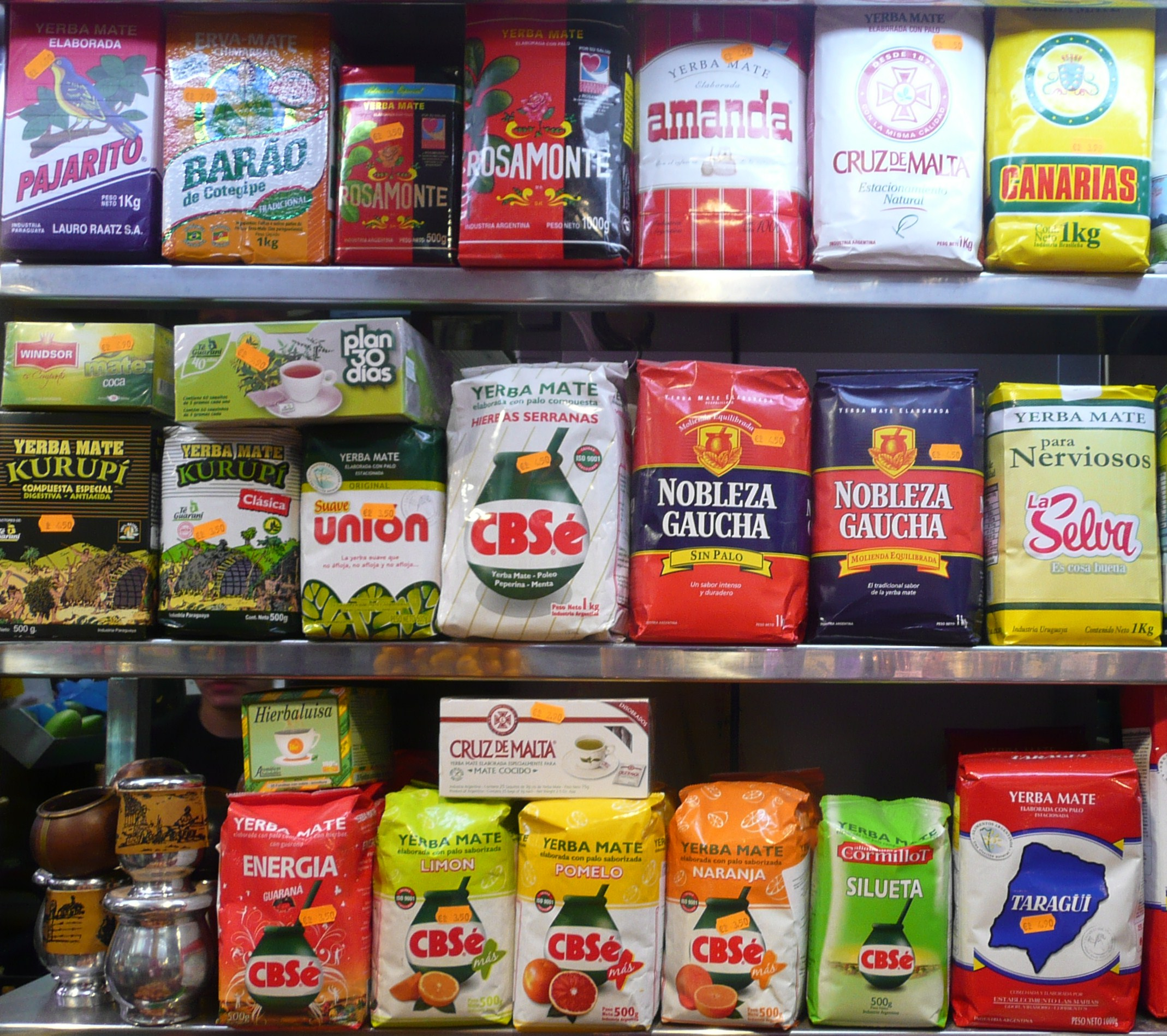
Yerba for sale in the open-air market of La Boqueria in Barcelona, Spain

Yerba mate contains a variety of polyphenols, such as the flavonoids, quercetin and rutin.

Yerba mate contains three xanthines: caffeine, theobromine, and theophylline, with caffeine content varying between 0.7% and 1.7% of dry weight (compared with 0.4–9.3% for tea leaves, 2.5–7.6% in guarana, and up to 3.2% for ground coffee). Theobromine content varies from 0.3% to 0.9%; theophylline is typically present only in small quantities or sometimes completely absent.

=== Weight loss ===
There is no good evidence for yerba mate having an effect on body weight in humans.

=== Cancer ===
Column chart displaying Benzo(a)pyrene concentration in processed yerba mate leaves sampled in 2006, 2008, and 2010: 2006 batches 2008 batches 2010 batches

Long-term consumption of hot mate (above 65 °C) was identified in 1991 by the International Agency for Research on Cancer (IARC) as "probably" causing esophageal cancer and oral cancer. There is no such association for cold mate and, in general, preparations under 65 °C are not considered carcinogenic and are evaluated as "not classifiable as to its carcinogenicity to humans" (group 3).

Because the traditional preparation of yerba mate leaves involves smoking them, exposure to polycyclic aromatic hydrocarbons, such as benzo(a)pyrene, which are carcinogenic, may significantly increase cancer risk.

== See also ==
- Black drink
- Club-Mate
- Matte Leão
- Ilex guayusa, known as guayusa, another caffeine-containing holly species of the Ilex genus, native to the Ecuadorian Amazon rainforest
- Ilex vomitoria, a caffeine-containing species of the Ilex genus native to North America
- Kuding, Ilex kudingcha
- Materva
- Nativa
- Guayaki
- Yerba Mate Playadito
