= Coca-Cola Light Sango =

Blood-orange flavoured variety of Coca-Cola Light/Diet Coke

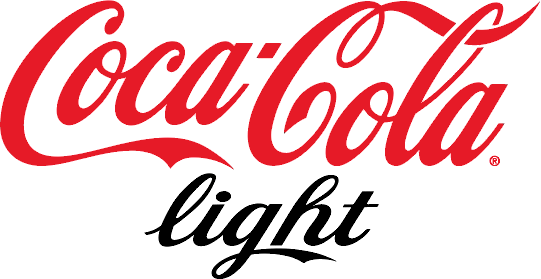
- Product type: Orange-flavoured cola
- Current owner: The Coca-Cola Company
- Produced by: The Coca-Cola Company
- Country: Belgium, France
- Introduced: 2006
- Discontinued: 2008
- Related brands: Coke Citra, Diet Coke/Coke Light with Lime, Diet Coke/Coke Light with Lemon, Mezzo Mix

Coca-Cola Light Sango was a blood-orange flavoured variety of Coca-Cola Light/Diet Coke produced by The Coca-Cola Company. It was distributed in Belgium in 2005, and in France in 2006. Coca-Cola Light Sango's name was based on sang, the French word for blood, in reference to its blood orange flavouring.

Developed in Belgium, the flavour was the first variety of Coca-Cola to have been developed outside of the Coca-Cola Company's Atlanta, Georgia, headquarters. Belgium was likely chosen due to its reputation as the world's top consumer of Coke Light products per-capita. The use of France and Belgium as test markets for Coke Sango was likely due to the success of previous citrus-flavoured varieties of Coke Light in the two countries.

After its limited release in its test markets of France and Belgium, the drink was discontinued by Coca-Cola sometime around 2007-2008. (Note: Previous versions of this article stated a discontinuation year of 2008. This was an unsourced and unverified date that has since been reported outside Wikipedia.)
