= Coca-Cola Lemon =

Soft drink brand

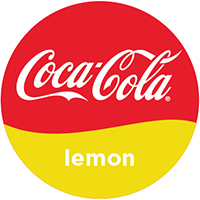
- Logo as seen on Coca-Cola fountains

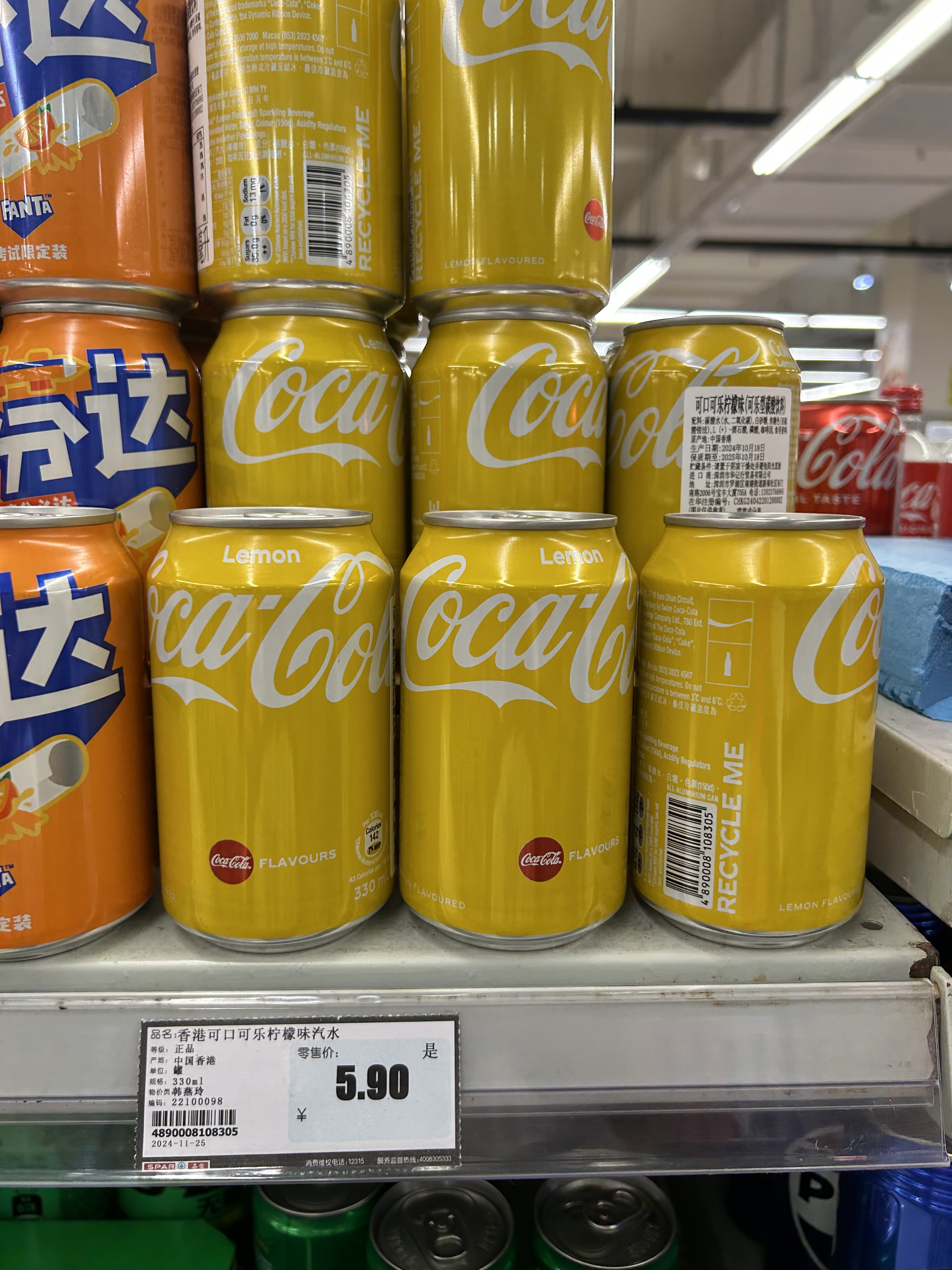
- Cans of Coca-Cola Lemon in Hong Kong in 2024
- Type: Lemon-flavored cola
- Manufacturer: The Coca-Cola Company
- Origin: United States
- Introduced: 2001; 25 years ago (Note: Launching of the Diet version. Later introductions were in 2005 (regular) and 2017 (Zero Sugar).)
- Related products: Coca-Cola Lime; Coca-Cola Citra

Coca-Cola Lemon, including its variants Diet Coke with Lemon and Coca-Cola Zero Sugar Lemon, are lemon-flavored cola soft drinks produced and distributed by The Coca-Cola Company's bottlers since 2001.

== History ==
Coca-Cola with Lemon was originally released as Diet Coke with Lemon (in some markets known as Coca-Cola Light Lemon), based on the company's existing Diet Coke product. It was test marketed in the Midwest United States in September 2001 and released in more areas the following month before global releases. The product was launched around the same time as rival PepsiCo's own lemon cola, Pepsi Twist, which they test marketed in 2000.

Diet Coke Lemon was only the second flavored cola drink (whether Coca-Cola or Diet Coke) introduced by the company, sixteen years after Cherry Coke was introduced. In the years following, the company would significantly expand the Coca-Cola portfolio. By 2007, it consisted of various additional new brands including Coca-Cola/Diet Coke Black Cherry Vanilla, BlāK, C2, Citra, Lime, Raspberry, Vanilla, Zero, as well as Diet Coke Plus and Diet Coke Sweetened with Splenda.

In April 2005, Coca-Cola announced Coca-Cola with Lemon, a version based on the regular Coca-Cola. In March 2017, Coca-Cola introduced Coca-Cola Zero Sugar Lemon, a version based on Coca-Cola Zero Sugar.

== Production ==
=== Diet Coke with Lemon / Coca-Cola Light with Lemon / Diet Coca-Cola with Lemon ===
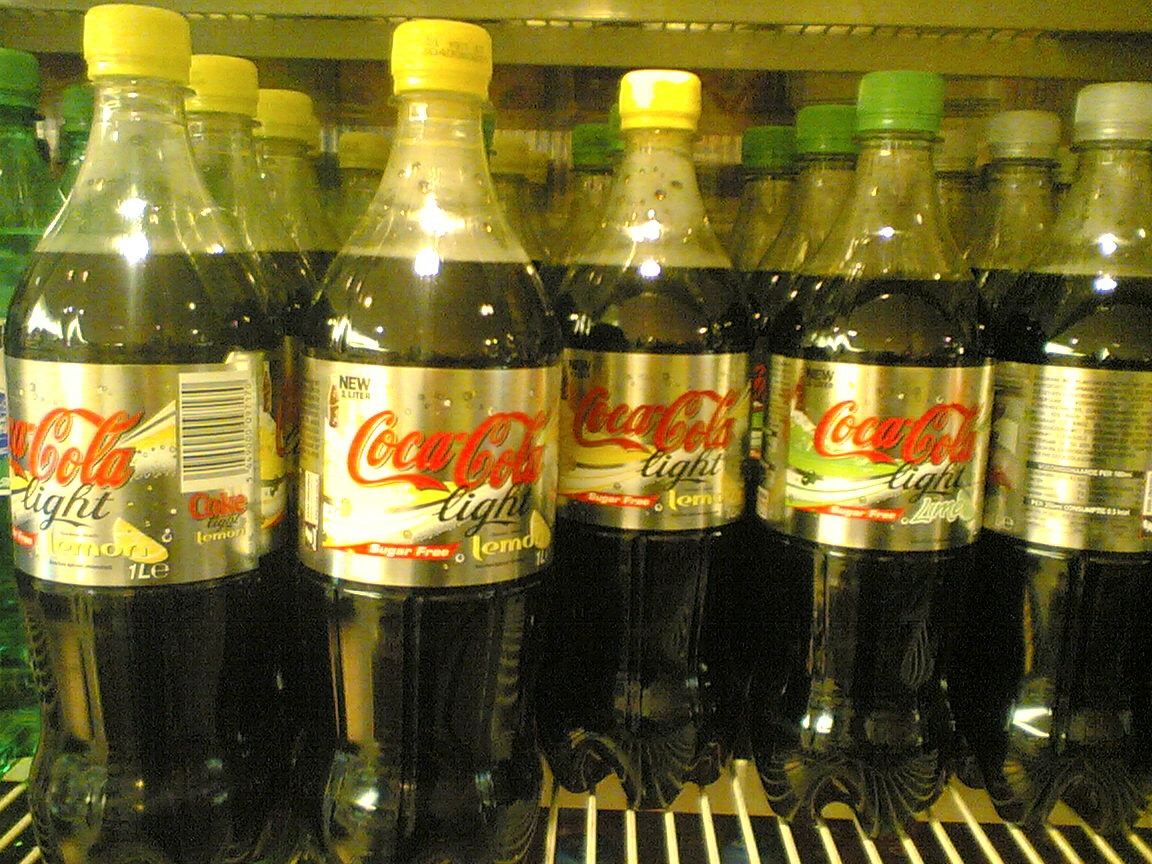
Bottles of Coca-Cola Light Lemon (on left) along with Lime (on right) in 2006

Diet Coke with Lemon was introduced in the United States in 2001. In most territories, it is now called Coca-Cola Light with Lemon or Diet Coca-Cola with Lemon.

The drink has since been released in many territories around the world. It launched in several European countries including Belgium, France and Great Britain in 2002. In Singapore, Coca-Cola Light with Lemon launched in 2003. It launched in South Africa in September 2004. In Japan, the drink launched in 2016.

The drink was discontinued in the United States at the end of 2005, although it is still available in Coca-Cola Freestyle machines.

=== Coca-Cola with Lemon / Coca-Cola Lemon ===
Coca-Cola with Lemon was first released in Japan on May 30, 2005. It received a limited released in Britain in summer 2005, and soon was released in France in 2006.

In July 2014, Coca-Cola with Lemon was re-released in Japan for a limited time. The product went to 16,622 different stores of 7-Eleven throughout Japan. The bottle was reintroduced with new packaging, and was only on shelves until supplies lasted. In March 2017, the drink was released in Brazil as a limited edition.

In 2022, the drink was introduced in Hungary. In February 2024, it was announced that the drink would return to Britain (along with a Zero Sugar variety) having been discontinued in 2006. In April 2024, the drink was introduced in Romania. In April 2025, the drink returned to the market in France. In autumn of 2025, the drink was introduced in Latvia, Estonia and Lithuania. In January 2026, the drink was introduced in Belgium and Luxembourg.

=== Coca-Cola Zero Sugar Lemon ===
Coca-Cola Zero Sugar Lemon was first released on 13 March 2017 in the Netherlands, and it has since been expanded to other countries around the world. The drink was released in Italy in April 2017 and Belgium and Luxembourg in May 2017. In 2018, Coca-Cola Zero Sugar Lime launched in Sweden and Israel. In Germany the drink was released in January 2022.

In Hungary it was discontinued in 2025 and replaced by Coca Cola Lime and returned in July 2026. In May 2026, Coca-Cola Zero Lemon was introduced in Romania. Coca-Cola Zero Lemon was available in North Macedonia from 2020, but it got discontinued in 2023.
