= Caffeine-Free Coca-Cola =

Caffeine-free version of Coca-Cola introduced in 1983

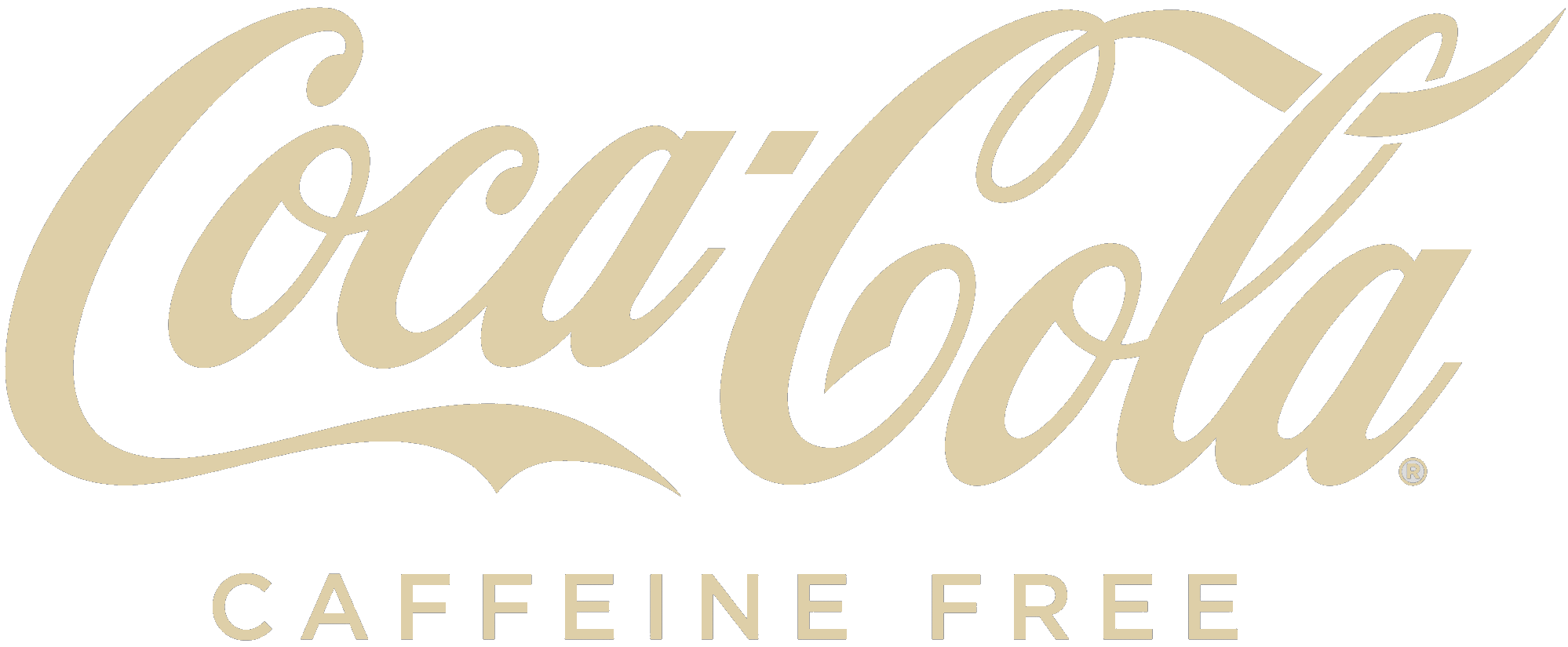

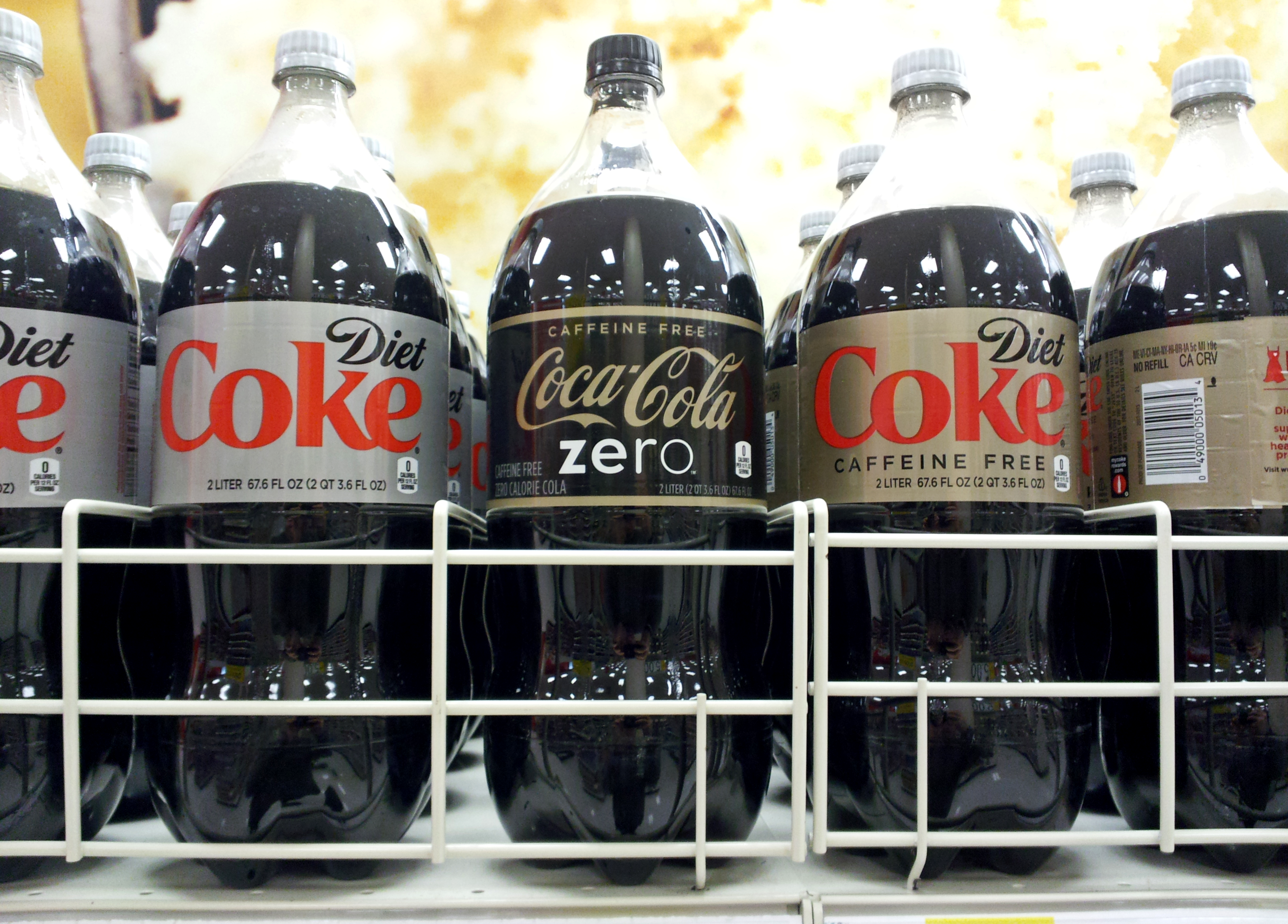
- Type: Cola
- Manufacturer: The Coca-Cola Company
- Origin: United States
- Introduced: 1983; 43 years ago
- Variants: Caffeine-Free Diet Coke; Coca-Cola Zero Sugar Caffeine Free
- Related products: Coca-Cola; Diet Coke; Coca-Cola C2; Coca-Cola Zero; Tab

Caffeine-Free Coca-Cola is a caffeine-free version of Coca-Cola, produced and sold by The Coca-Cola Company in bottles, cans and Freestyle machines. It also includes Caffeine Free Diet Coke, based on Diet Coke, and Coca-Cola Zero Sugar Caffeine Free, based on Coca-Cola Zero Sugar.

Caffeine-free colas were first released in 1983–84 for both regular Coca-Cola and Diet Coke, but also the company's Tab cola. It was made at a time of growing health public consciousness in regard to caffeine and sugar drinks and came a year after competing Pepsi Free (later called Caffeine-Free Pepsi), which launched a year earlier. Caffeine-Free Coke have since been marketed all around the world. In 2013, Caffeine-Free Coca-Cola Zero was introduced in the United States and Canada. It had been sold in other territories such as France prior to its North American release.

In 2020, it was reported that Caffeine-Free Coca-Cola had been difficult to find in stores, both in cans and 2-liter bottles. The explanation given by various non-official sources is that it is due to a shortage of aluminum cans caused by the 2021–2023 global supply chain crisis. Because of the shortage of cans, less popular products are in short supply. However, there was no ongoing shortage of aluminum cans.

== See also ==
- Coca-Cola
- Diet Coke
- Coca-Cola Zero Sugar
