= Patio (drink) =

Sugar-free Soda

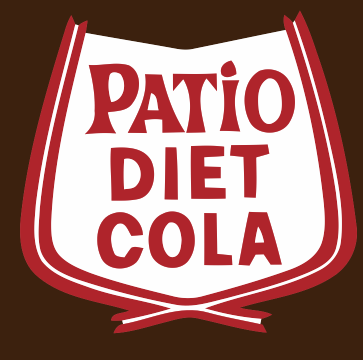
- Type: Diet cola
- Manufacturer: PepsiCo
- Origin: United States
- Introduced: 1963
- Variants: Root Beer; Orange; Imitation Grape; Imitation Strawberry; Dry Ginger Ale; Dry Club Soda; Dry Tonic Water; Diet Cola; Red Cherry

Patio Diet Cola was a brand of diet soda introduced by PepsiCo in 1963. It was created in response to Diet Rite Cola. Fitness promoter Debbie Drake was Patio Diet Cola's spokesperson; the drink was also marketed as a soda alternative for diabetics.

In 1964, Patio released orange, grape, and root beer flavors. This flavor line was not meant to compete with brands like Orange Crush, but rather fill out the line. Patio sodas were available in the cold-bottle market: grocery and mom-and-pop stores. Advertising for Patio was comparatively scarce; at the time, bottlers were regionally franchised, and related advertising was necessarily local.

In 1964, Patio Diet Cola became Diet Pepsi. The newly branded diet soda was advertised alongside Pepsi, with the tagline "Pepsi either way", which replaced the slogan "Dances with flavor". Most of the remaining Patio line of flavors were phased out by the early 1970s, while a few survived until the mid-1970s.

Patio Red Cherry was available as a soda fountain choice at Bojangles' Triarc-franchised locations in central North Carolina, but no longer appears on the Bojangles website as of June 2024. Patio Red Cherry was not a diet soda as it contained 58g of sugar in a 16oz serving. However, the "patio" logo on the fountain dispenser was substantially the same as that used on the 12-ounce cans of diet soda from 1972 through 1976 (which were accompanied by a design with spiral rows of balls).

== In popular culture ==
The creation of an advertising campaign for Patio was a featured plot of a three-episode story arc in the third season of the AMC television series Mad Men, first mentioned in the episode “Love Among the Ruins" (2009, S03E02). In the next episode, "My Old Kentucky Home" (2009, S03E03), the advertising agency hires an Ann-Margret look-alike. Finally, in "The Arrangements" (2009, S03E04), they use a riff of Ann-Margret's opening number from the film Bye Bye Birdie for their Patio television commercial.

== Flavors ==
- Diet Cola (became Diet Pepsi in 1964)
- Root Beer
- Orange
- Imitation Grape (later changed to artificially flavored)
- Imitation Strawberry
- Dry Ginger Ale
- Dry Club Soda
- Dry Tonic Water
- Red Cherry (contains sugar; not a diet/diabetic soda)
