= Diet Coke =

Diet cola brand

- Logo used since December 25, 2017

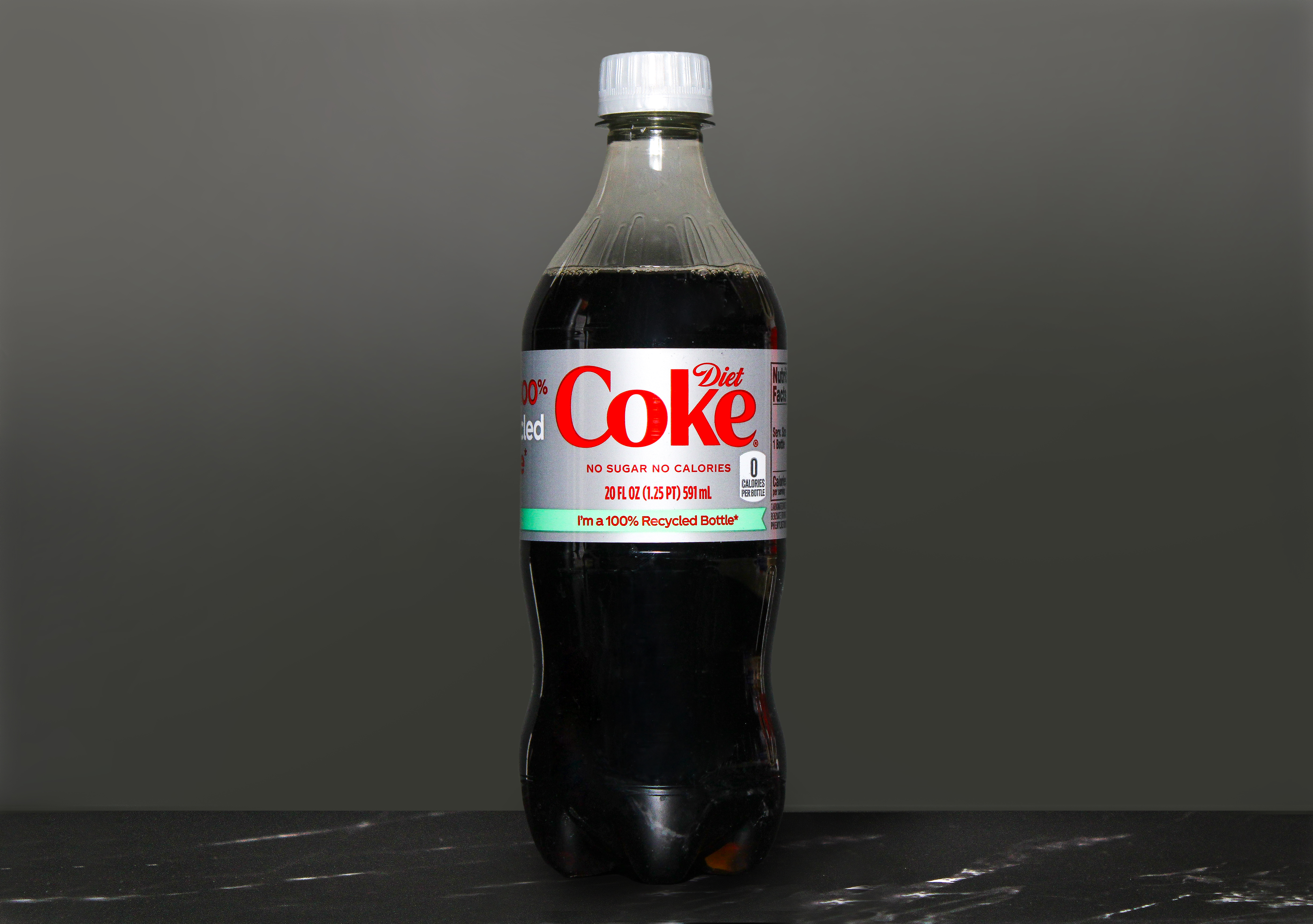
- A 20oz bottle of Diet Coke
- Type: Diet cola
- Manufacturer: The Coca-Cola Company
- Origin: United States
- Introduced: July 1982; 44 years ago
- Color: Caramel
- Variants: See below
- Related products: Coca-Cola; Coca-Cola C2; Coca-Cola Zero Sugar; Tab; Diet Pepsi; Pepsi Max
- Website: dietcoke.com

Diet Coke, also branded as Coca-Cola Light or Diet Coca-Cola, is a sugar-free and low-calorie diet soda produced and distributed by the Coca-Cola Company. It is a cola drink containing artificial sweeteners, primarily aspartame, instead of sugar. Diet Coke is based on a different recipe from the flagship Coca-Cola drink, with a distinct taste of its own.

Unveiled on July 8, 1982, it was the first new brand since the Coca-Cola Company's creation in 1886 to use the Coca-Cola trademark. Following its launch, Diet Coke/Coca-Cola Light became wildly successful and a cultural status symbol. It has since been a core product and brand for the company, leading worldwide diet soda sales for most of its existence.

== History ==
When diet colas first entered the market, beginning with No-Cal in 1958, the Coca-Cola Company had a long-standing policy to use the Coca-Cola name only on its flagship cola, and so its diet cola was named Tab when it was released in 1963. Its rival Pepsi had no such qualms, and after the long-term success of its sugar-free Diet Pepsi (launched in 1964) became clear, Coca-Cola decided to develop a competing sugar-free brand under the Coca-Cola name that could be marketed more easily than Tab. The new product was years in the making, and it was based on Tab's recipe instead of the Coca-Cola formula. Internally, the secret development was known as Project Harvard.

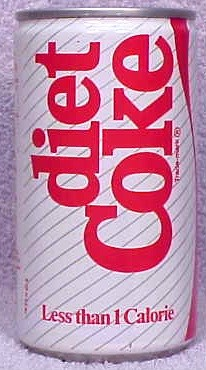
Original Diet Coke can from 1982

Diet Coke was launched in 1982, debuting in New York City in Julyand expanding to some Canadian markets and throughout most of the United States by the end of the year. and rolling out to most of the rest of the United States by end of 1982, and some Canadian markets. Coca-Cola referred to it as "the Company's most significant new product entry in 96 years". In an attempt to address concerns that Diet Coke may eat into sales of Tab, then President of Coca-Cola USA Brian Dyson told the New York Times that the company was looking to target men as a new demographic of diet soda drinkers. It quickly overtook Tab in sales by a wide margin (though Tab would remain on the market for decades to come) to become the top selling low-calorie soft drink in America. Diet Coke's domestic success was swift, by the end of 1983 overtaking 7UP to become the third highest selling soft drink overall in the United States, a position it would hold on to for decades to come. According to the company, Diet Coke was the "fastest-growing major soft drink in history."

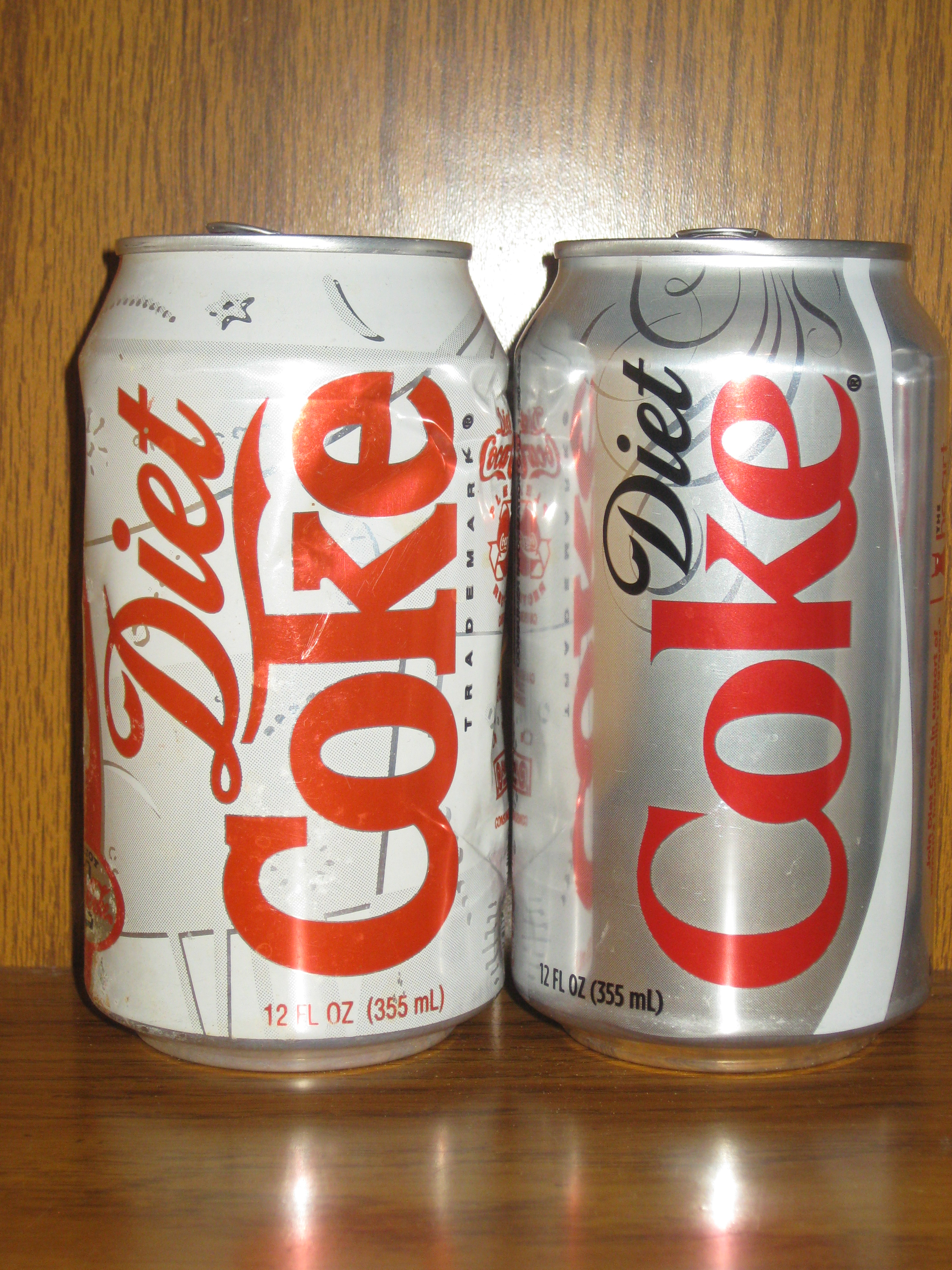
White mid-1990s and silver late-2000s Diet Coke cans next to each other

In 1983, Diet Coke was launched in 28 international markets to a high degree of success. In many markets, the drink was branded as Coca-Cola Light (or Coke Light) instead. Diet Coke/Coca-Cola Light was launched in a further ten major markets in 1984, including Japan. The Coca-Cola Company then used the Diet Coke recipe to develop the controversial New Coke with high-fructose corn syrup and with a slightly different balance of ingredients, released in 1985.

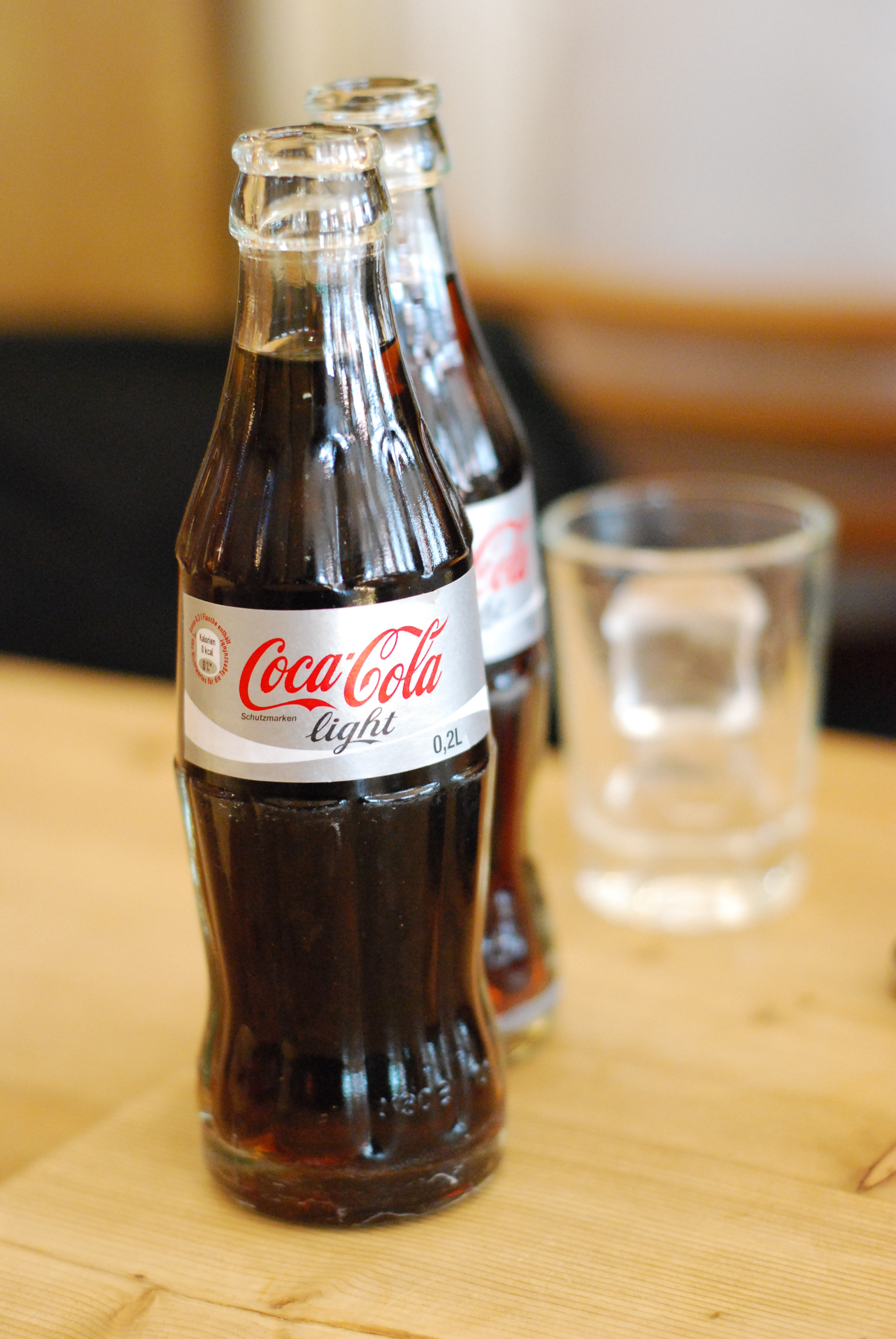
Glass bottles of Coca-Cola Light

The company launched the first Diet Coke variety product, Caffeine-free Diet Coke, in 1983, which is a diet/sugarless version of Caffeine-Free Coca-Cola. In 1986, Coca-Cola introduced Diet Cherry Coke (later known as Diet Coke Cherry) in American markets, a diet version of Coca-Cola Cherry which itself became the first flavored cola drink the company had released.

In the United States, Diet Coke held a market share of 11.7% in 1991 according to Beverage Digest (this compares to 20.0% for Coca-Cola Classic and 18.4% for Pepsi-Cola). In the year 1992, the product was available in 117 markets worldwide with a unit case volume of 1.25 billion. In some countries, including Australia, Belgium, Germany, Great Britain and Norway, it was the second most sold carbonated soft drink, all behind Coca-Cola. At the start of 1994, Diet Coke was redesigned for the first time since in eight years, and the logo most notably added a scripted "Diet" in place of the simple italic letters it previously bore. Later, the drink was relaunched as Coca-Cola Light in some countries where Diet Coke underperformed, with a slightly sweeter taste to suit local preferences.

In the 2000s when cola manufacturers were increasingly diversifying products, Coca-Cola launched Diet Coke with Lemon in 2001, a type of Diet Coke with lemon flavor, as well as Diet Vanilla Coke in 2002 (a sugarless version of Coca-Cola Vanilla) and then in 2004 launched Diet Coke with Lime and Diet Coke Plus, with more vitamins and minerals, in 2007. The company also launched a separate second sugar-free cola drink in 2005 called Coca-Cola Zero, now known as Coca-Cola Zero Sugar, which is more closely based on original Coca-Cola.

In 2005, under pressure from retailer Walmart (which was impressed with the over-the-counter popularity of Splenda sweetener), the company released a new formulation called "Diet Coke sweetened with Splenda". Sucralose and acesulfame potassium replaced aspartame in this version. As the formulation was done to mollify one retailer, this variety had little advertising and promotion, as the company preferred to market Coca-Cola Zero instead.

In 2010, Diet Coke surpassed Pepsi in sales for the first time to become the second most popular soda in the United States after Coca-Cola. Diet Coke dropped below Pepsi again in 2014. In 2018, the Diet Coke brand was significantly revamped and "relaunched" in its biggest change since it launched. A new wave of bold Diet Coke flavors were launched, including Ginger Lime, Feisty Cherry, Zesty Blood Orange and Twisted Mango, and then Blueberry Acai and Strawberry Guava in 2019.

== Marketing and impact ==
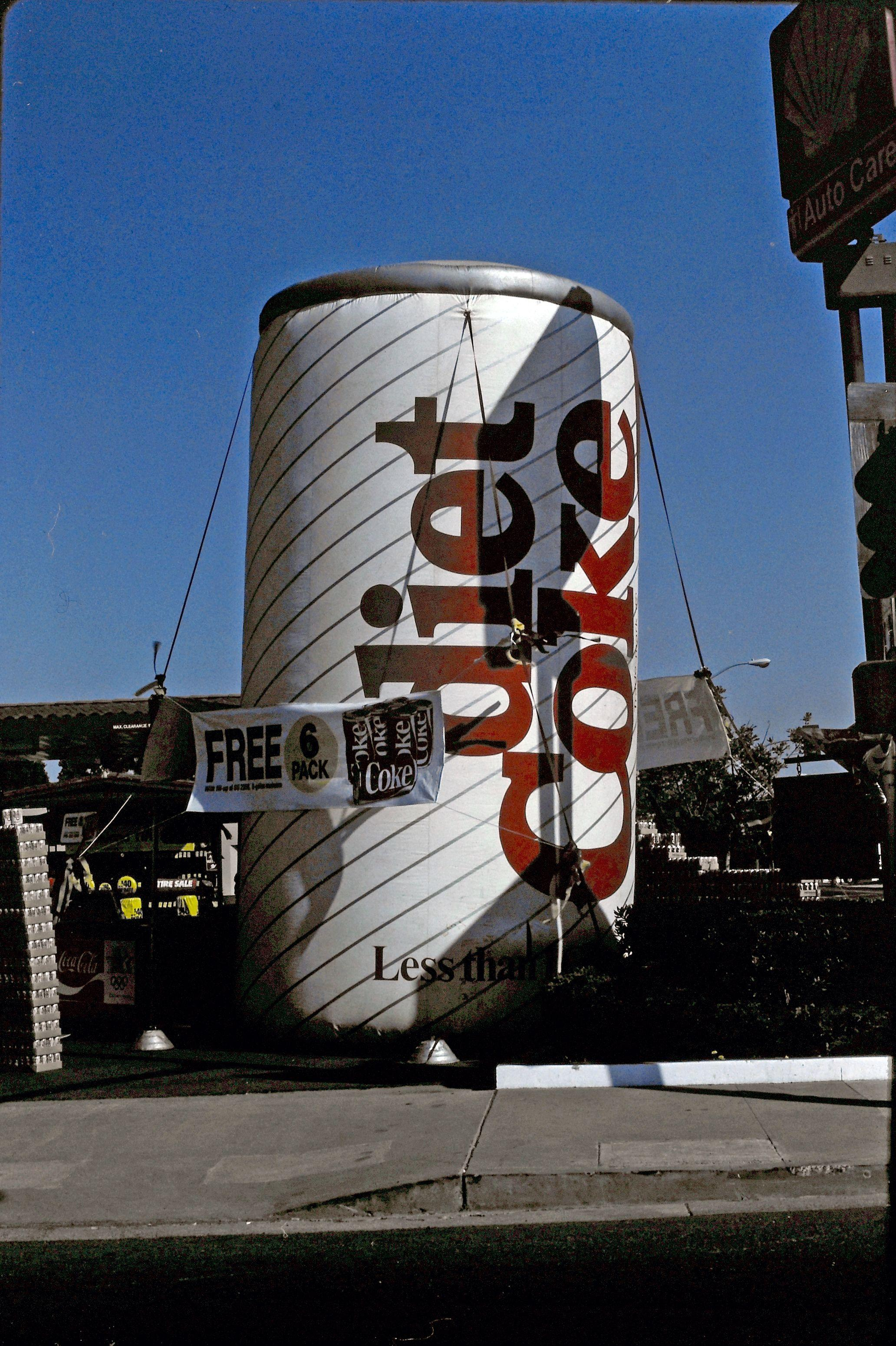
An inflatable Diet Coke can sculpture in California, 1980s

Diet Coke (and rivals like Diet Pepsi) have capitalized on the markets of people who require low sugar regimens, such as diabetics and people concerned with calorie intake. For example, a 330 ml can of Diet Coke contains around 1.3 kilocalories (5 kJ) compared to 142 kilocalories (595 kJ) for a regular can of Coca-Cola (exact values may vary by region).

Coca-Cola used the slogan "Just for the taste of it!" for almost all years between its 1982 launch and at least 1997, and has been accompanied with an iconic jingle. A version of the song was also performed by Elton John and Paula Abdul in an ad at Super Bowl XXIV. A famous advert of the brand was "Diet Coke Break" in 1994 featuring Lucky Vanous, from which point on the brand became targeted primarily at women. In 1996, Coca-Cola tied in with TV sitcom Friends to advertise Diet Coke, at a time when soda sales had been struggling. The ads began to emphasize the "Coke" and taste of the product instead of its health connotations. Beginning in 2011, in many countries around the world Coca-Cola swapped the logo of their cola products including Diet Coke with 150 of the local country's most popular names, as part of campaigns called "Share a Coke". In an effort to be more appealing to millennials, Diet Coke in 2018 was packaged in a taller, more slender can (of the same volume), although the cans reverted to the conventional shape a year later.

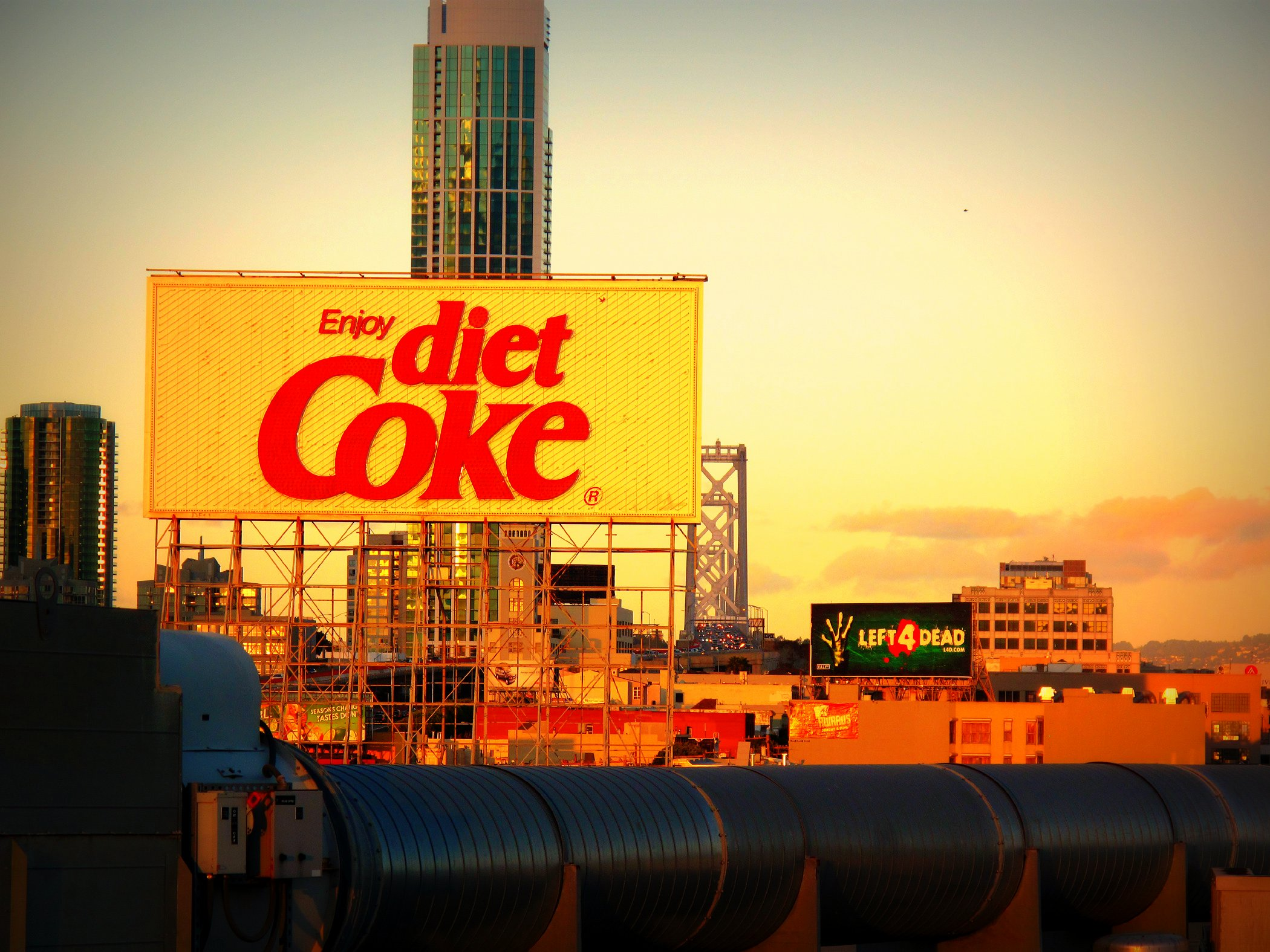
Enjoy Diet Coke billboard in the USA

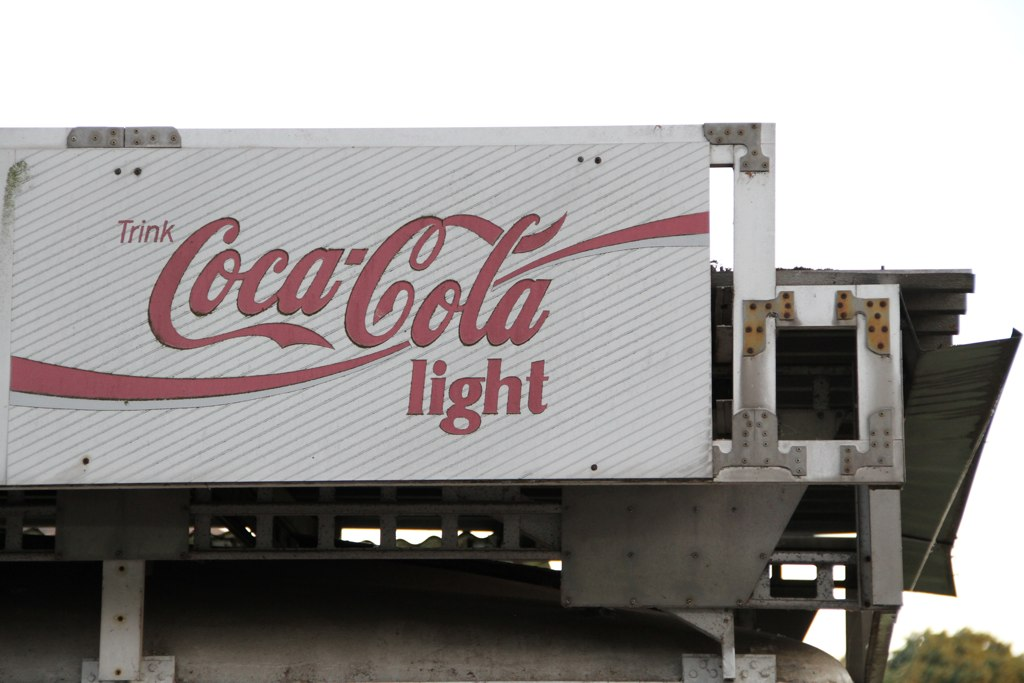
Trink Coca-Cola Light billboard in Germany

The drink's all-silver can color, which has been in use since 1997, has been considered iconic and a distinctive design. Diet Coke has had a significant cultural impact, including links with healthiness and wellness but also negative connotations in regards to body image. It has achieved high popularity in certain circles with loyal fans, including in popular culture. Victoria Beckham, Dua Lipa and Bill Clinton are known fans of the drink, and Donald Trump notably has a dedicated button for Diet Coke in his presidential office. The drink has been known to be the choice of "it girls", and has been popular in the fashion scene. Designers Karl Lagerfeld and Jean Paul Gaultier have previously served as the brand's creative director. Kate Moss became creative director in 2022 at the drink's 40th anniversary.

Partly because of marketing reasons, connected to the public perception of the word "diet" and what it stands for, Coca-Cola launched Coca-Cola Zero as another sugarless cola product in 2005. "Zero sugar" has become increasingly trendy in the early 2020s. While the company have attempted to sideline Diet Coke in favor of Zero Sugar, loyal customers have kept Diet Coke alive and still selling in higher numbers in the US, as of 2025. Although Diet Coke continues to be one of the most popular soft drinks, diet sodas in general have increasingly dipped by target consumers choosing non-soda beverages like water or coffee. Consumption of soda drinks overall among Americans has been in decline after the 2000s.

=== Naming ===
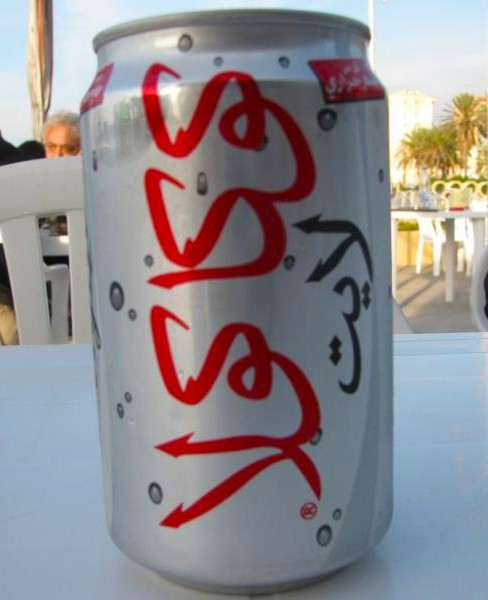
Can with Coca-Cola Light branding in Arabic

Since its inception in 1982, Diet Coke has been the product name in Coca-Cola's home country the United States and a number of other countries. Other countries, such as Germany (then West Germany) have used the Coca-Cola Light name since the beginning. This name is now most common in most of Europe, the Middle East, Latin America and Asia. In Canada's Quebec, the drink is sold as Coke Diète.

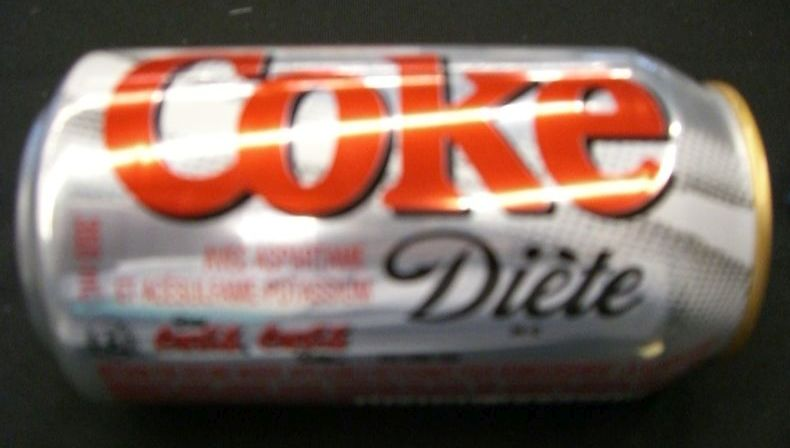
Can with Coke Diète branding, Canada

In many countries including Italy, Mexico and the Netherlands, the product originally launched in 1983–84 under the "Diet Coke" name, but would later switch to the "Coca-Cola Light" name in the early 1990s. Similarly in Australia, it renamed some time from its original name to "Diet Coca-Cola". In Japan, it was known as "No Calorie Coca-Cola" from 2007. In Germany and the Netherlands, the name was changed from Coca-Cola Light to "Coca-Cola Light Taste" as part of the 2018 rebranding, but reverted back by 2021.

=== Advertising slogans ===
Coca-Cola has used various slogans throughout Diet Coke's history to advertise the product, both in the United States and internationally. "Just for the taste of it!" was the brand's first tagline and has been used continuously off and on since 1982. Another tagline Diet Coke used in the 1980s was "The one of a kind".

In the 1990s, a number of different slogans were used including: "Taste it all!", "This is Refreshment", and "You are what you drink". This was followed by "Live Your Life" in 1999. In the 2000s, slogans used for Diet Coke include: "Do what feels good", "Must be a Diet Coke thing", "Life is how you take it", "Light it up!", and "Yours". In 2009, Diet Coke was part of Coca-Cola's Open Happiness campaign which lasted for several years. There was also the "Hello You..." campaign in Britain in 2009, and "I light it" in Spain 2010 (a reference to Coca-Cola Light).

From 2010 to 2014, "Stay Extraordinary" was the main slogan in use. Coca-Cola launched the "You're on" campaign in 2014. However it was soon dropped after it was mocked, due to its unintentional drug reference (cocaine). Later that year, "Get a Taste" was introduced, asking the question "what if life tasted this good?". This campaign lasted until 2018. In 2018, Diet Coke launched the "Because I can." slogan and campaign at the same time as a major rebrand and the addition of new flavors. The campaign had a lukewarm reception. In 2020, a new campaign was launched in Britain, "Give yourself a Diet Coke break".

In 2021, Diet Coke launched the slogan and campaign "Just because", along with a remixed version of their "Just for the taste of it!" jingle. "This Is My Taste" was launched for the brand in Britain and Ireland in 2024.

== Ingredients ==
The ingredients and taste of Diet Coke has slight variations between different bottling countries. According to the Coca-Cola Company, the sweetener blend is "formulated for each country based on consumer preference". Diet Coke in the U.S. was sweetened with aspartame, an artificial sweetener that became available in the United States in 1983. Early on, to reduce costs, this was blended with saccharin. After Diet Rite cola advertised its 100 percent use of aspartame, and the manufacturer of NutraSweet (then G. D. Searle & Company) warned that the NutraSweet trademark would not be made available to a blend of sweeteners, Coca-Cola switched the formula to 100 percent aspartame. Diet Coke from fountain dispensers still contains some saccharin to extend shelf life.

Cyclamates were banned in the U.S. in 1970 after Canadian laboratory tests found it could pose health risks. In countries where they are permitted Diet Coke/Coca-Cola Light may be sweetened with a blend containing aspartame, cyclamates, and acesulfame potassium (Ace-K), which reportedly would give a sweeter taste compared to the original American product. The use of sodium cyclamates depends, for example in Hong Kong, Coca-Cola Light contains it in its ingredients whereas in Singapore it does not because the substance is banned. In Canada, Ace-K was added to the Diet Coke recipe sold locally in 1995. In 2008, Coca-Cola removed the sodium benzoate preservative from Diet Coke specifically in the British market due to health risks associated with it.

Other than sweeteners, Diet Coke differs from Coca-Cola by having a higher amount (approximately 33% more) of caffeine. A 12 oz serving of Diet Coke contains 46 mg of caffeine compared to 34 mg in the equivalent Coca-Cola or Coca-Cola Zero Sugar. 99% of a diet soda like Diet Coke is water compared to 90% in a full calorie soda like Coca-Cola.

== Health assessment ==
The most commonly distributed version of Diet Coke uses aspartame as a sweetener. As one of the most intensively scrutinized food additives, the safety of aspartame has been studied since its discovery. Aspartame has been deemed safe for human consumption by the regulatory agencies of many countries. Nevertheless, since its inception the drink has been scrutinised by some with claims that it is harmful in various ways, such as that it can dehydrate and increase food cravings. Such claims have also been scientifically countered.

== Brand portfolio ==
Name	Launched	Discontinued	Notes
Diet Coke	1982	—N/a	The original variety. It was the first variant of Coca-Cola to be produced without sugar.
Caffeine-Free Diet Coke	1983	—N/a	Diet Coke without the caffeine. It was the first extension of the Diet Coke formula.
Diet Cherry Coke/Diet Coke Cherry	1986		Diet Coke with a cherry flavor.
Diet Coke with Lemon	2001		Diet Coke with a lemon flavor.
Diet Vanilla Coke/Diet Coke Vanilla	2002		Diet Coke with a vanilla flavor. Currently only available as a selection in Coca-Cola Freestyle machines.
Diet Coke with Lime	2004		Diet Coke with a lime flavor.
Diet Coke Raspberry	June 1, 2005	End of 2005	Diet Coke with a raspberry flavor.
Coca-Cola Light Citra/Diet Coke with Citrus Zest	2005	2018	Diet Coke with a lemon and lime flavor.
Diet Coke Sweetened with Splenda	2005	2024	A version that was sweetened with Splenda (sucralose) and acesulfame potassium. Diet Coke with Splenda contained 2.83 mgs of caffeine per fluid ounce.
Diet Coke Black Cherry Vanilla	2006	2007	Diet Coke with a combination of black cherry and Vanilla flavors.
Coca-Cola Light Sango	2005	2010's	Coca-Cola Light with a blood orange flavor.
Diet Coke Plus Vitamins	2007	2011	Diet Coke with a combination of vitamins and minerals.
Diet Coke Plus Antioxidant	2007	unknown	Diet Coke with a combination of antioxidants and a Green Tea flavor.
Diet Coke Plus	2007	2011	Diet Coke with a combination of vitamins and minerals.
Coca-Cola Light Lemon-C	2008	2017	Lemon-flavored Coca-Cola Light with a combination of vitamins and minerals.
Diet Coke Feisty Cherry	2018	2020	Diet Coke with a "spicy" cherry flavor.
Diet Coke Ginger Lime	2018	2020	Diet Coke with a combination of Ginger and Lime flavors. It was sold in the United States and Canada (replacing Diet Coke with Lime) and in a number of European countries.
Diet Coke Twisted Mango / Exotic Mango	2018	2020	Diet Coke with a Mango flavor. It was sold in the United States and Canada, and as "Exotic Mango" in a number of European countries.
Diet Coke Zesty Blood Orange	2018	2020	Diet Coke with a Blood Orange flavor, similar to Coca-Cola Light Sango. It was sold in the United States, Canada, Great Britain and Ireland.
Diet Coke Ginger Lemon	2018	2020	Diet Coke with a combination of Ginger and Lemon flavors. Exclusively sold in the United States from Coca-Cola Freestyle machines.
Diet Coke Strawberry Guava	2019	2020	Diet Coke with a Psidium cattleyanum flavor, sold in the United States.
Diet Coke Blueberry Acai	2019	2020	Diet Coke with an Açaí Blueberry flavor, sold in the United States.
Diet Coke Twisted Strawberry	2019	2020	Diet Coke with a Strawberry flavor, only sold in Great Britain and Ireland.
Coca-Cola Light Taste Pineapple	2019	2020	Coca-Cola Light with a Pineapple flavor, only sold in Belgium and Luxembourg.
Coca-Cola Light Taste Goji Berry Lime	2019	2020	Coca-Cola Light with a Goji and lime flavor, only sold in the Netherlands, Belgium and Luxembourg.

== See also ==
- Diet Coke and Mentos eruption
- Diet Coke Break
- Coca-Cola Zero Sugar
- Diet Pepsi
