= Pepsi Twist =

Lemon flavored cola

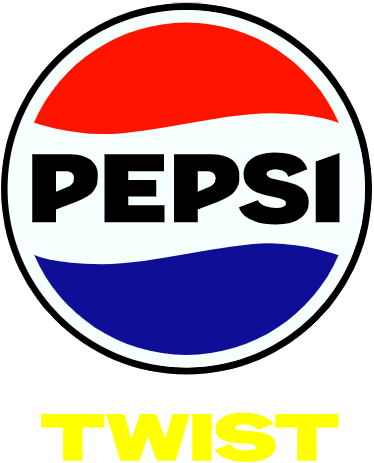

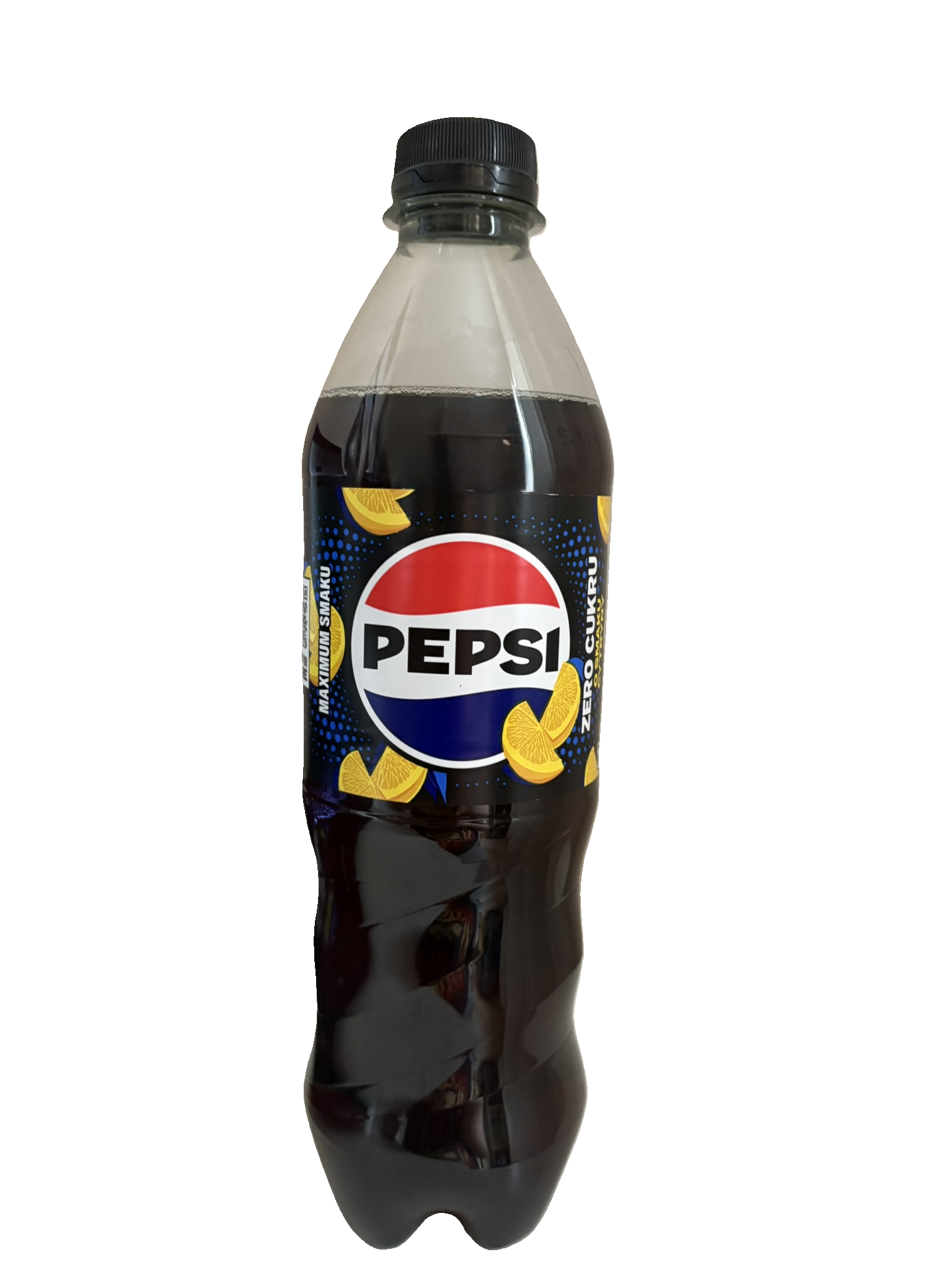
- Pepsi Twist (Zero Sugar variant) bottle from Poland (2025)
- Type: Lemon-flavored cola
- Manufacturer: PepsiCo
- Origin: United States
- Introduced: 2000; 26 years ago
- Variants: Diet Pepsi Twist
- Related products: Coca-Cola with Lemon, Pepsi Light, Pepsi Lime, Coca-Cola with Lime

Pepsi Twist, also marketed as Pepsi Lemon Twist, is a lemon-flavored version of the regular Pepsi Cola soft drink, marketed by PepsiCo. The drink was test marketed in 2000 and launched in November 2001 in the United States, around the same time as its rival The Coca-Cola Company's Coca-Cola with Lemon, although has since been discontinued in America. Pepsi Twist has been marketed in other regions around the world, including no-calorie variants Diet Pepsi Twist/Pepsi Twist Light (Diet Pepsi) and Pepsi Twist Zero Sugar (Pepsi Zero Sugar), and continues to be sold in parts of South America and Europe.

== Precursor ==
Bottled lemon-flavored Pepsi dates back to 1975. The first incarnation of Pepsi Light was cola and lemon flavor with 50% fewer calories. It was soon replaced with lemon-flavored diet cola of the same name in the 1970s and 1980s in the United States called Pepsi Light, which was lemon-flavored by necessity to counteract the aftertaste of the artificial sweetener saccharin. When aspartame became more widely available, the lemon flavoring was removed from the newly rechristened Diet Pepsi in 1983.

== Marketing ==
=== United States ===
The product was advertised during Super Bowl 2003, with Ozzy, Jack and Kelly Osbourne appearing in the commercial, along with Florence Henderson and Donny and Marie Osmond. It was also endorsed by pop singer Britney Spears in 2002 and 2003, as part of her contract with the company; it also appeared as a promotional tie-in with Austin Powers in Goldmember.

In 2005, Japanese toy company Takara released a special edition Transformers Optimus Prime (known as "Convoy" in Japan) figure in Pepsi colours, with a bottle/can holding trailer. Known as Pepsi Convoy, this figure comes pre-packaged with a cardboard Pepsi Twist bottle. This figure was later released two years later in America as "Pepsi Optimus Prime", with some slight modifications.

Professional wrestler CM Punk dubbed one of his signature moves the Pepsi Twist.

=== Brazil ===
In 2002 a pair of lime mascots (although referred to as lemons) were created for a TV commercial in Brazil dubbed by actors and comedians Lúcio Mauro Filho and Bruno Mazzeo, involving a style of acid humor. The popularity of the commercials involving the characters led to them becoming brand mascots, often returning to appear together every time the brand was relaunched and sometimes also appearing printed on the cans.

In 2007, plush toys of the characters were distributed through a campaign called "Toma que o Limão é seu" ("Take the Lemon, it's yours"). The plushes were distributed again in 2014 in another promotion. In 2016 a female lime (referred to as "limoa") appeared in a commercial being voiced by singer Anitta. The characters also appeared in a collaboration with the Ruffles brand for the launch of Ruffles' lemon flavor.

In 2018 another mascot was created for the limited ginger flavor in Brazil also sold under the Pepsi Twist brand, called Gengibrão.

== Availability ==
=== Americas ===
Original logo of Pepsi Twist, 2000–03

Pepsi Twist was introduced on June 16, 2000 in the US states of Minnesota and Texas. After a successful test run, it was released all across the country on November 5, 2001. The product was marketed until being discontinued in the summer of 2006. Pepsi Twist made a brief informal return in the summer of 2008, with the NFL Kickoff Limited Edition Flavor, which boasted that it was Pepsi "with a kick of lemon."

Pepsi Twist launched in Brazil on 1 February 2002 and became a fairly successful product. A limited-edition version was also sold, the Pepsi Twistão, with an even stronger lime flavor.

Pepsi Twist was launched in Chile in 2003. In Argentina, it went on sale in October 2002, the following year "Pepsi Twist Light" was launched, until it was withdrawn from the market in late 2004 because of low sales. At the end of 2023 they announced its return as "Pepsi Twist Black". In Uruguay, Pepsi Twist was first launched in 2005. Ten years later, it was reintroduced in a limited edition in September 2015. It was brought back again in January 2025, in no-calorie Pepsi Zero Sugar formulation.

=== Europe ===
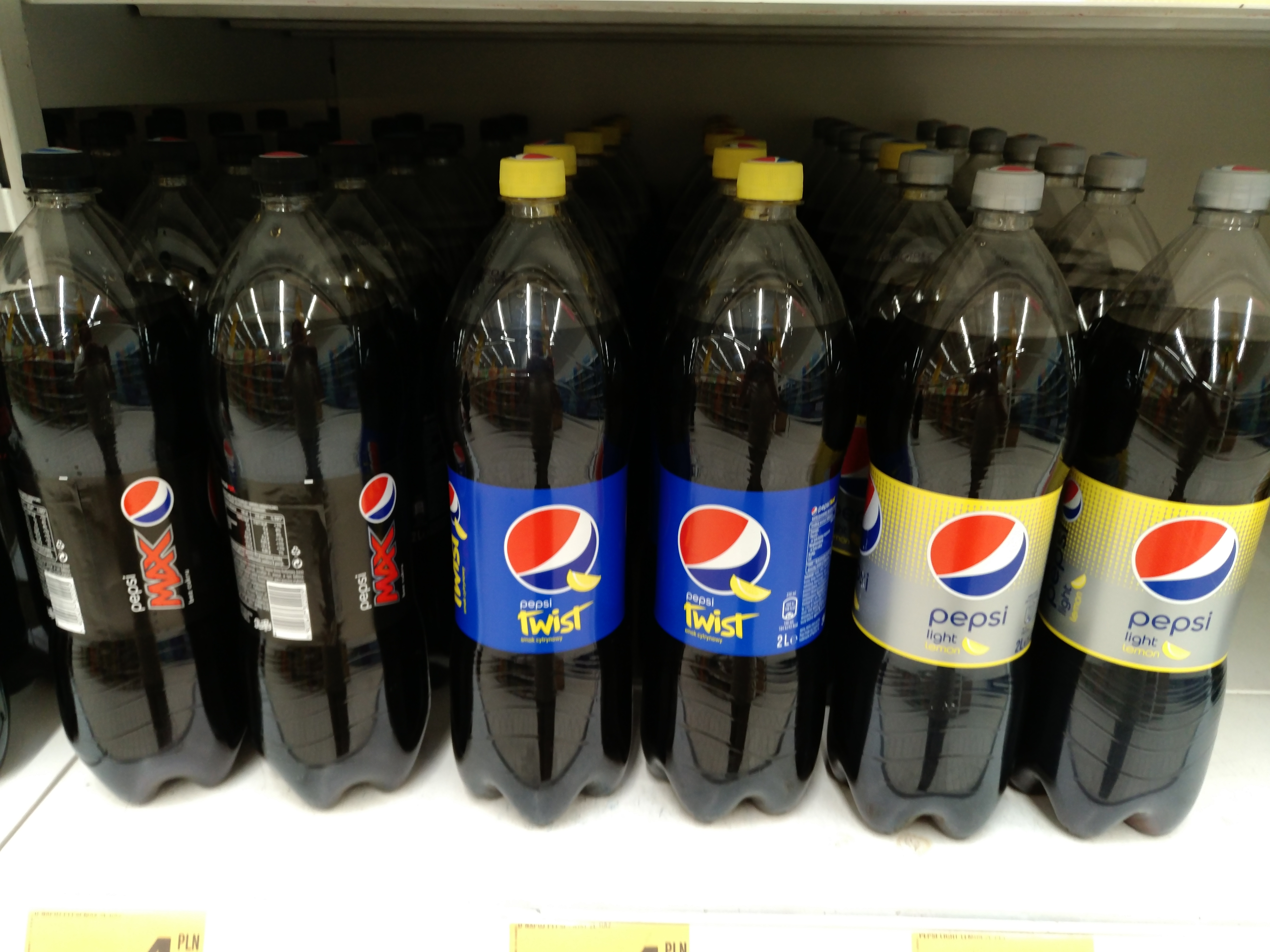
Bottles of Pepsi Twist (in the middle) next to Pepsi Max and Pepsi Light Lemon in Poland in 2016

Pepsi Twist was launched in Great Britain by local distributor Britvic in July 2002, being the first launch of a Pepsi brand variant in the country since Pepsi Max in 1993. It was soon discontinued, with Britvic announcing a similar drink for their Pepsi Max range called Lemon and Lime Twist, in November 2004. PepsiCo also launched Pepsi Twist in France, in 2002.

Pepsi Twist was introduced in Poland in the summer of 2002. In 2013, PepsiCo decided to introduce Pepsi Light Lemon in Poland, without the "Twist" brand name. Pepsi Twist is marketed in Romania as of 2006 under the name Pepsi Twist Lemon as well as Pepsi Twist Light Lemon (diet version). In 2024, Pepsi Twist Zero Sugar was introduced in Romania, which is based on Pepsi Zero Sugar (newly renamed from Pepsi Max). In Czech Republic and Slovakia, Pepsi Twist was introduced in 2002, its diet counterpart Pepsi Twist Light was introduced in January 2003. Both versions were on sale as of 2010.

Pepsi Twist launched in Italy in late 2002. In 2012, a variant called Pepsi Twist Fusion launched in Italy in a special bottle. Pepsi Twist launched in Portugal in 2003 as a limited edition during summer, and has remained popular. The drink has also been sold in Turkey, and is available as of 2020. In the Netherlands and Belgium, the original Pepsi Twist was sold for a while, and was replaced by Pepsi Max Twist, a "lemon and lime" version, which has also been discontinued. It has since been returned under the "Pepsi Max Cool Lemon" brand. In Ukraine, Pepsi Twist was released in 2004. In 2012, it was reintroduced under the "Pepsi +1" logo and "Pepsi-Twist" trade name. In Latvia, Pepsi Twist was introduced in late 2011.

=== Asia ===
PepsiCo launched the drink under the name "Pepsi A-ha" in India in 2002. It did not sell very well and was later phased out. The drink was also launched in Thailand, in October 2002 and then relaunched as Pepsi Twist with Extra Lemon in March 2004.

Pepsi Twist was released in Japan in 2003. In the Philippines, it was released in 2002, and was an instant hit among the teenagers, but failed to capture the market. Pepsi Twist was also released in Pakistan in 2006. The product failed to capture the market. In Cyprus, Pepsi Twist was introduced at the start of 2014.

== See also ==
- List of Pepsi types
