= Diet Rite =

Soft drink brand

- Type: Diet soda
- Manufacturer: Keurig Dr Pepper
- Origin: United States
- Introduced: 1954; 72 years ago
- Discontinued: 2024; 2 years ago
- Related products: Diet Coke, Diet Pepsi, and Tab
- Website: https://www.kdpproductfacts.com/product/a0e3h000003LJzLAAW/diet-rite-cola-12-fl-oz-us

Diet Rite was a brand of no-calorie soft drinks that was originally distributed by the RC Cola company.

== History ==
Diet Rite was introduced in 1954 and was initially released as a dietetic product, but in 1962 it was introduced nationwide and marketed to the general public as a health-oriented beverage. The original formula was sweetened with cyclamate and saccharin. After cyclamate was banned in 1969, it was removed from the product. NutraSweet brand aspartame was added after its introduction to the market, and in 1987 saccharin was eliminated entirely, along with caffeine. In the 1990s, several fruit-flavored varieties of Diet Rite were introduced.

In 2000, the line was reformulated again, this time to replace aspartame with Splenda brand sucralose and Sunett brand acesulfame potassium. It became the first major diet soda in the United States to use neither aspartame nor saccharin as a sweetener. In 2005, "Pure Zero" was added to the name, and a cherry cola flavor was introduced in 2006.

The soda was discontinued in late 2024 and remained owned by Keurig Dr Pepper.

== Flavors ==
- Diet Rite Pure Zero Cola: The classic, caffeine-free diet cola.
- Diet Rite Pure Zero Red Raspberry: A highly popular, sweet, and fruity option.
- Diet Rite Pure Zero White Grape: A light, fruity flavor.
- Diet Rite Pure Zero Tangerine: A bright citrus option.
- Diet Rite Pure Zero Black Cherry: A deep, cherry-flavored soda.
- Diet Rite Pure Zero Cherry Cola: A blend of classic cola and cherry.

== Advertising ==
In the early 1960s, The Paris Sisters performed a jingle for a Diet Rite television commercial that included the line "Stay thin with the best-tasting cola of all!".
