= Coca-Cola Citra =

Beverage made by The Coca-Cola Company

Coca-Cola Citra Diet Coke with Citrus Zest
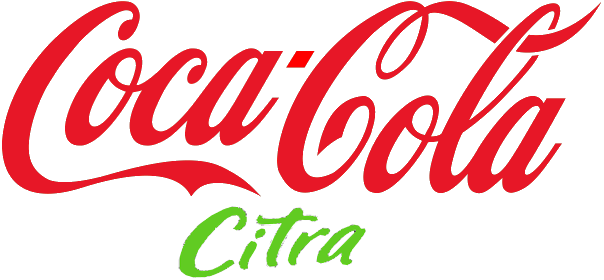
- Product type: Citrus flavored cola
- Current owner: The Coca-Cola Company
- Country: United States
- Introduced: 2005; 21 years ago
- Related brands: Diet Coke; Coca-Cola with Lemon; Coca-Cola with Lime

Coca-Cola Citra is a lemon and lime blend flavored variant of Coca-Cola, a cola beverage made by The Coca-Cola Company.

The drink was first released in Mexico in April 2005 as a trial product, both as a regular cola and a diet (Diet Coke/Coca-Cola Light) version known as Coca-Cola Citra Light. It was thereafter given a limited edition run in the New Zealand market from October 2005 until 2006, and again from March-September 2007. Coca-Cola Citra was also released in Japan, where it was distributed from May 29, 2006, for about a year.

The diet version of the drink had a permanent release and distribution in Britain as Diet Coke with Citrus Zest. It was launched there in February 2007, replacing the Diet Coke with Lemon and Diet Coke with Lime flavors. It was originally reported that an orange-flavored drink, i.e., Coca-Cola Light Sango, was planned to launch instead. In May 2018, Diet Coke with Citrus Zest was discontinued in the British market, replaced by Diet Coke Exotic Mango.

In 2023, a Zero Sugar variant, named Coca-Cola Zero Calories Lemon-Lime, was released in Jordan.

== See also ==
- Coca-Cola
- Coca-Cola Lemon
- Coca-Cola Lime
