= Diet Coke Plus =

Variant of Diet Coke

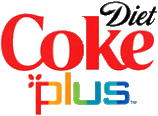

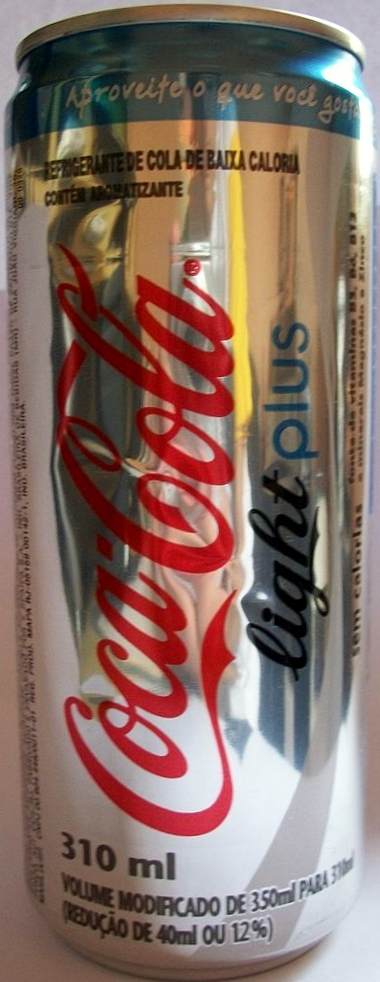
- Brazilian Coca-Cola Light Plus
- Type: Diet Cola
- Manufacturer: The Coca-Cola Company
- Origin: United States
- Introduced: 2007
- Discontinued: 2011; 15 years ago (USA)
- Related products: Coca-Cola; Diet Coke

Diet Coke Plus, also marketed as Coca-Cola Light Plus, was a formulation of Diet Coke fortified with vitamins and minerals. It was sweetened with a blend of aspartame and acesulfame potassium.

The drink was first released in April 2007 in the United States. Coca-Cola then launched it in Belgium in July 2007, followed by Britain in October 2007, and France, Germany and Finland in 2008. It was also released in Brazil in January 2010.

Coca-Cola Light Plus logo including the indicators of its two variants

In some markets (excluding the US) it was available in two variants, one with vitamins B_{3}, B_{12}, and vitamin C, and the other containing antioxidants with added green tea and vitamin C. Although Diet Coke Plus Antioxidants is labeled as sugar free, it actually contains 0.1 grams of sugar in the green tea powder per 100ml.

== FDA warning letter ==
On December 10, 2008, the United States Food and Drug Administration wrote a Warning Letter to The Coca-Cola Company that Diet Coke Plus violates the Federal Food, Drug, and Cosmetic Act. The term "plus" is a regulated term on food and beverages. A food may be labeled "plus" to describe its nutrients only if it contains at least 10% more of the Reference Daily Intake or Daily Reference Value compared to the usual amount. Because Diet Coke Plus labeling does not indicate the increased amount of nutrients, it cannot use the word "plus" on its label. Regardless, snack foods, such as carbonated soda, may never use the word "plus" because the FDA does not consider it appropriate to fortify snack foods. The FDA required The Coca-Cola Company to detail corrective action within 15 days.

The Coca-Cola Company issued a statement saying, "This does not involve any health or safety issues, and we believe the label on Diet Coke Plus complies with FDA's policies and regulations."

When a food manufacturer or marketer violates federal regulations, the FDA generally will send a letter to the company. While the letters themselves are not legally binding, the FDA may take the company to court if it does not take corrective action. The drink was discontinued in November 2011.
