= Brian Dyson =

American businessman (1935–2026)

- Born: September 7, 1935; Santa Fe Province, Argentina
- Died: August 9, 2026 (aged 90)
- Education: University of Buenos Aires; Harvard Business School
- Occupation: Former CEO of The Coca-Cola Company
- Spouse: Evelyn Penelope Jane Dyson

Brian G. Dyson (September 7, 1935 – August 9, 2026) was an American businessman and the chief executive officer (CEO) of Coca-Cola Enterprises Inc. from 1986 to 1991. Dyson is also known for his “five balls” speech.

== Early life and career ==
Brian G. Dyson was born in Santa Fe Province, Argentina on September 7, 1935. Dyson earned his BA from Facultad de Ciencias Económicas in University of Buenos Aires. He later attended Harvard Business School.

Dyson joined Coca-Cola Co. in Venezuela in 1959 and worked for many years in South America, the Caribbean and Mexico. In 1978 Dyson was named the president of Coca-Cola United States, the company's U.S. soft drink division. In 1983, he was named president of Coca-Cola North America, with responsibility for the company's entire North America portfolio. In 1986 Dyson was named president and chief executive officer (CEO) of Coca-Cola Enterprises (CCE).

He served as a Senior Consultant to The Coca-Cola Company from January 1992 to October 1993. He retired from The Coca-Cola Company in 1994, but remained active as a consultant to the company. In August 2001 he came out of retirement and accepted the position of vice chairman and chief operating officer (COO) of The Coca-Cola Company.

Dyson was the individual responsible for changing old Coke's name and then eventually restoring it.

He was a Member of advisory board of Linley Capital. From May 1995, Dyson served as a Director of Audits & Surveys Worldwide Inc. He served as the chairman of the Board of PlusPharma from August 2004. Dyson was also the President of Chatham International Corp. from December 1993.

An author of short stories, in 1996 he published a novel, Pepper in the Blood.

== Personal life and death ==
Dyson was married to Penny Dyson. In 1978, the family moved to Atlanta. They had two children.

Dyson died from complications of pneumonia on August 9, 2026, at the age of 90.
