= Diet soft drink =

Soft drink with little or no sugar or calories

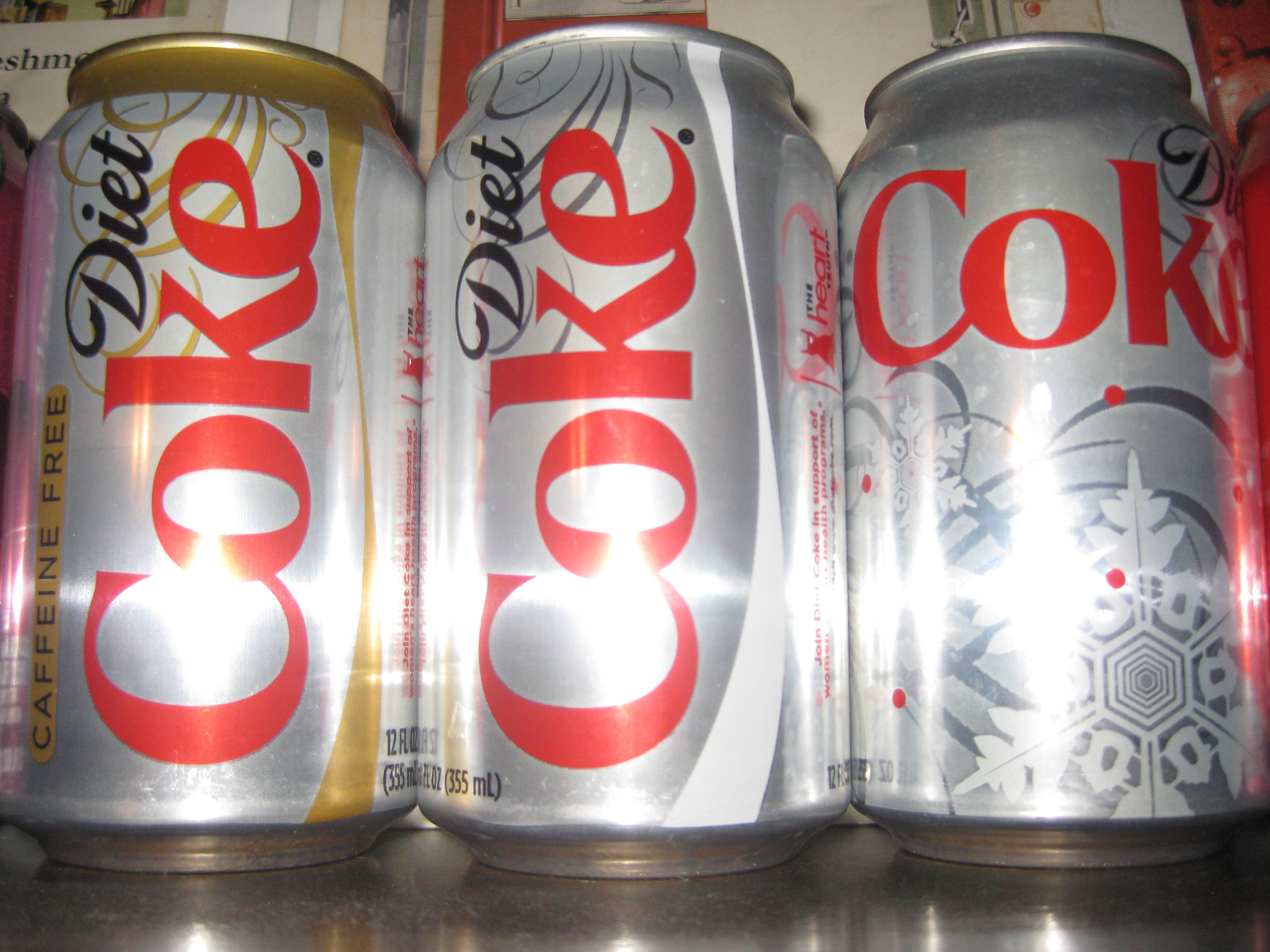
Diet Coke, one of the most popular diet sodas in the world

Diet soft drinks (also known as sugar-free, zero-calorie, low-calorie or zero-sugar soda, pop, or soft drinks) are soft drinks which contain little or no sugar and/or calories. First introduced onto the market in 1949, diet sodas are typically marketed for those with diabetes or who wish to reduce their sugar or caloric intake.

== History ==
Though artificial sweeteners had been known since the discovery of saccharin in 1878, the diet beverage era began in earnest with the 1949 launch of La Casera (also known as Gaseosa) in Madrid, Spain using cyclamate. The product, which belongs now to Suntory Beverage and Food Europe (SBFE), is still on the market. This was followed by the development of No-Cal ginger ale in 1952. Hyman and Morris Kirsch of Kirsch Beverages (Brooklyn, New York) formulated No-Cal for diabetic and otherwise sugar-restricted hospital patients, also using cyclamate calcium to replace the sugar. Recognizing Americans' growing desire for weight loss, Kirsch began marketing No-Cal to the general public, particularly to women. By 1953, the drink had become popular in New York City and the surrounding region. Canada Dry followed with Canada Dry Glamor in 1954.

In 1958, Royal Crown Cola introduced their own cyclamate and saccharin sweetened dietetic beverage, Diet Rite. Following highly successful trials in Chicago and North Carolina, RC began marketing Diet Rite nationwide for the general public in 1962. It shortly became the 4th-best selling soda in the US, behind only Coca-Cola, Pepsi, and RC Cola itself.

The following year (1963), Dr Pepper released a diet version of its own soft drink, "Dietetic Dr. Pepper" (later renamed to Sugar Free Dr. Pepper, then Diet Dr. Pepper), although it sold slowly due to the misconception that it was meant solely for diabetic consumption. The same year, The Coca-Cola Company joined the diet soft drink market with Tab, followed up by Pepsi with Patio Diet Cola (shortly renamed to Diet Pepsi). Coca-Cola added Fresca in 1966.

All of the above products were originally sweetened with cyclamates and saccharin, this changed as a result of experiments conducted in the late 1960's. In 1969, an FDA scientist announced that eggs injected with cyclamate resulted in deformed chicks. In the same year, the University of Wisconsin found that laboratory rats given high doses of cyclamate resulted in an increased incidence of bladder cancer. This led to further studies by Abbott Laboratories (a manufacturer of cyclamate) which found a similar result. Per the Delaney amendment, the FDA announced a ban on cyclamate in food and drink products, to take effect in 1970. Diet sodas were reformulated with saccharin alone (in the hopes that consumers would tolerate the metallic aftertaste), but the market share of diet sodas rapidly fell from 20% to 3% overall.

After further studies in the 1980s linked saccharin to cancer as well, most manufacturers switched to aspartame in 1983.

By the early 1990s, a wide array of companies had their own diet refreshments on supermarket shelves. Tab made a comeback during the late 1990s after new studies demonstrated that saccharin is not an important factor in the risk of cancer. Nevertheless, The Coca-Cola Company has maintained its 1984 reformulation, replacing some of the saccharin in Tab with NutraSweet.

By 2002, some beverage companies had diversified to include such flavors as vanilla and lemon among their products and diet drinks were soon being produced with those flavors as well (see Diet Vanilla Coke, Diet Pepsi Vanilla). By 2004, several alcohol companies had released sugar-free or "diet" alcoholic products too.

== Sweeteners ==
Several different sweeteners are used to replace sugar in low-calorie diet beverages. The primary compounds worldwide are aspartame, saccharin, sucralose, cyclamates (outside the US), acesulfame potassium ("Ace K"), and stevia.

The ideal goal in artificial sweetening is to replicate the exact taste and texture effects of sucrose with one or more non-caloric sweeteners. Despite decades of research and development, this goal remains elusive. Most sweeteners carry a marked aftertaste, often described as "bitter" or "metallic". The perception of this aftertaste has been studied intensively, and appears to be based on genetic factors that vary from person to person.

In recent years, rising consumer preference for "natural" products and concern over the possible health effects of artificial sweeteners has spurred demand for stevia-based sweeteners and driven manufacturers to seek novel phytochemicals.

=== Aspartame ===
Aspartame, commonly known by the brand name NutraSweet, is one of the most commonly used artificial sweeteners. The 1982 introduction of aspartame-sweetened Diet Coke accelerated this trend. Today, at least in the United States, "diet" is nearly synonymous with the use of aspartame in beverages.

Neotame and advantame are further derivatives of aspartame. They received FDA approval in 1998 and 2014 respectively. Due to its high efficiency (20,000 times sucrose) which enables use of minute quantities for sweetening, advantame has the advantage of being safe to consume for individuals with phenylketonuria. As such, products sweetened with it are not required to carry a phenylalanine warning label.

=== Cyclamates ===
Cyclamates are approved as a sweetener in at least 130 countries, including the European Union. In 1970, the Food and Drug Administration banned cyclamates in the United States based on the results of a study which found that it increased the incidence of bladder cancer in rats in combination with saccharin. Later studies were unable to reproduce the original studies results. Although the FDA has stated that a review of all available evidence does not implicate cyclamate as a carcinogen, cyclamate remains banned in the US.

=== Sucralose and acesulfame potassium; "sugar-free" soft drinks ===
Recently, two other sweeteners have been used with increasing frequency: sucralose (marketed as Splenda) and acesulfame potassium ("Sunett" or "Ace K"). The K in "Ace K" represents the chemical symbol for potassium. Acesulfame potassium is usually combined with aspartame, sucralose, or saccharin rather than alone and its use is particularly common among smaller beverage producers (e.g. Big Red). Diet Rite is the non-aspartame diet soft drink brand with the highest sales today; it uses a combination of sucralose and acesulfame potassium.

In the US, sucralose and Ace-K received FDA approval for use in soft drinks in 1998.

Advocates say drinks employing these sweeteners have a more natural sugar-like taste than those made just with aspartame, and do not have a strong aftertaste. The newer aspartame-free drinks can also be safely consumed by phenylketonurics, because they do not contain phenylalanine. Critics say the taste is not better, merely different, or note that the long-term health risks of all or certain artificial sweeteners is unclear.

The widespread, though not universal, agreement that the newest formulations taste much more "normal" (sugar-like) than the older diet soft drinks have prompted some producers, such as Jones Soda, to abandon the "diet" label entirely in favor of "sugar-free", implying that the taste is good enough to drink even when not trying to lose weight. (This idea was first floated by Diet Coke in 1984, with the tagline, "Just For the Taste of It.")

In 2005, The Coca-Cola Company announced it would produce a sucralose-containing formulation of Diet Coke known as Diet Coke with Splenda, but that it would continue to produce the aspartame version as well. There were also rumors that a sugar-free version of Coca-Cola Classic, also sweetened with sucralose, was being formulated as well. This formulation was eventually called Coca-Cola Zero, though it is sweetened with aspartame in conjunction with acesulfame potassium.

=== Stevia ===
Stevia-based sweeteners incorporate steviol glycosides, sweet-tasting compounds produced in the leaves of the Stevia rebaudiana plant.

One study investigated the electrochemical properties of stevia rebaudiana, a herb with potential as a glucose sugar alternative. By using a cyclic voltammetric technique with a nano-sensor modified glassy carbon electrode, the limited safety dose was determined as 0.4 mM (28 mg/mL), where the stevia compound acted as an anti-oxidative sweetener. The study also showed that the electrochemical properties of stevia varied in acidic and alkaline pH, with an oxidative behavior in acidic and an anti-oxidative behavior in alkaline solutions.

Initially launched in Argentina in 2013, Coca-Cola Life is made with a mix of stevia and sugar as its sweeteners. Pepsi has also released a variant of their cola sweetened with stevia and sugar, called Pepsi Next.

== Amount of artificial sweeteners in diet soft drinks ==
The table below displays milligrams of sweetener and phosphorus in a 12-ounce (≈355 ml) serving of canned soft drink, as provided by the manufacturers in the US market in 2012. Fountain drinks may contain different sweeteners or different amounts of the same sweeteners.

| Beverage | Aspartame (mg) | Acesulfame K (mg) | Sucralose (mg) | Phosphorus (mg) |
|---|---|---|---|---|
| Diet Coke | 188 | 0 | 0 | 27 |
| Coke Zero Sugar | 87 | 47 | 0 | 54 |
| Diet Pepsi | 124 | 32 | 0 | 33 |
| Diet Pepsi Lime | 125 | 32 | 0 | 89 |
| Diet Pepsi Vanilla | 125 | 32 | 0 | 89 |
| Pepsi Zero Sugar | 125 | 32 | 0 | 42 |
| Pepsi Next | 36 | 18 | 14 | 33 |
| Diet Dr. Pepper | 185 | 0 | 0 | 50 |
| Diet Mountain Dew | 86 | 27 | 27 | 0 |
| Sprite Zero Sugar | 75 | 51 | 0 | 0 |
| Fresca | 75 | 51 | 0 | 0 |
| Barq's Diet Root Beer | 99 | 61 | 0 | 0 |

== Health concerns ==
Many consumers are concerned about possible health effects of sugar substitutes and caffeine overuse.

Reviews and dietetic professionals have concluded that moderate use of non-nutritive sweeteners as a safe replacement for sugars may help limit energy intake and assist with managing blood glucose and weight. Other reviews found that the association between body weight and non-nutritive sweetener usage is inconclusive.

Multiple reviews have found no link between artificial sweeteners and the risk of cancer. FDA scientists have reviewed scientific data regarding the safety of aspartame and different sweeteners in food, concluding that they are safe for the general population under common intake conditions.

High consumption of artificially sweetened beverages was associated with a 12% higher risk of all-cause mortality and a 23% higher risk of cardiovascular disease (CVD) mortality in a 2021 meta-analysis. A 2020 meta-analysis found a similar result, with the highest-consuming group having a 13% higher risk of all-cause mortality and a 25% higher risk of CVD mortality. However, both studies also found similar or greater increases in all-cause mortality when consuming the same amount of sugar-sweetened beverages.

== Nomenclature ==
In countries outside of the United States, United Kingdom and Canada, the term "light" is often used instead of "diet"; sometimes, even in countries that do not speak English, the word "light" in English is used (e.g., "Coca-Cola Light" in Spain). The formulation of these is slightly different than the "diet"-named versions and thus the taste is slightly different.

== Reduced-calorie drinks ==
In an effort to profit on the surging popularity of low-carbohydrate diets, Coca-Cola and PepsiCo both released reduced-calorie versions of their flagship colas in 2004. The products contain approximately half the sugar of the regular versions. The Pepsi variant, Pepsi Edge, is sweetened with sucralose and corn syrup. The sweetening of the Coca-Cola variant, Coca-Cola C2, is a combination of corn syrup, aspartame, acesulfame potassium and sucralose. Pepsi discontinued Edge in 2005, citing lackluster sales. Coca-Cola soon followed suit. Pepsi then released Pepsi Max in 2012.

Half of the sugar of a can of regular cola still exceeds the daily sugar allowance of some popular low-carbohydrate diets. It is possible that these soft drinks were targeted to so-called "carb-conscious consumers", who are paying attention to their carbohydrate intake but not trying to drastically reduce it.

== Consumption ==
According to a study by the National Center for Health Statistics, about one-fifth of the US population ages 2 years and over consumed diet drinks on a given day in 2009‒2010, and 11% consumed 16 fluid oz. of diet drinks or more. Overall, the percentage consuming diet drinks was higher among females compared with males. The percentage consuming diet drinks was similar for females and males at all ages except among 12- to 19-year-olds, where a higher percentage of females than males consumed diet drinks. A higher percentage of non-Hispanic white people consumed diet drinks compared with non-Hispanic black and Hispanic people. The study included calorie-free and low-calorie versions of soft drinks, fruit drinks, energy drinks, sports drinks, and carbonated water.

== Regulation ==
Diet soda is defined in US law as a food of minimal nutritional value.

== See also ==
- Fat substitute
- Light beer
- List of brand name soft drinks products
- List of soft drink flavors
- List of soft drink producers
- List of soft drinks by country
