= Diet Pepsi =

Sugar-free, artificially sweetened soda

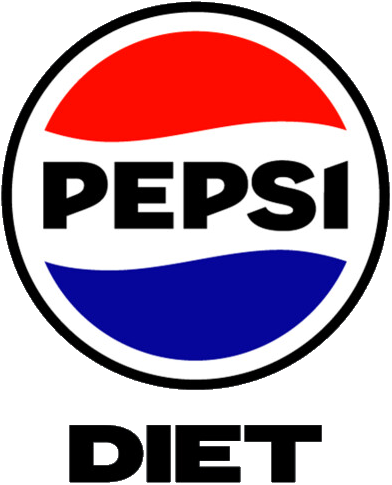

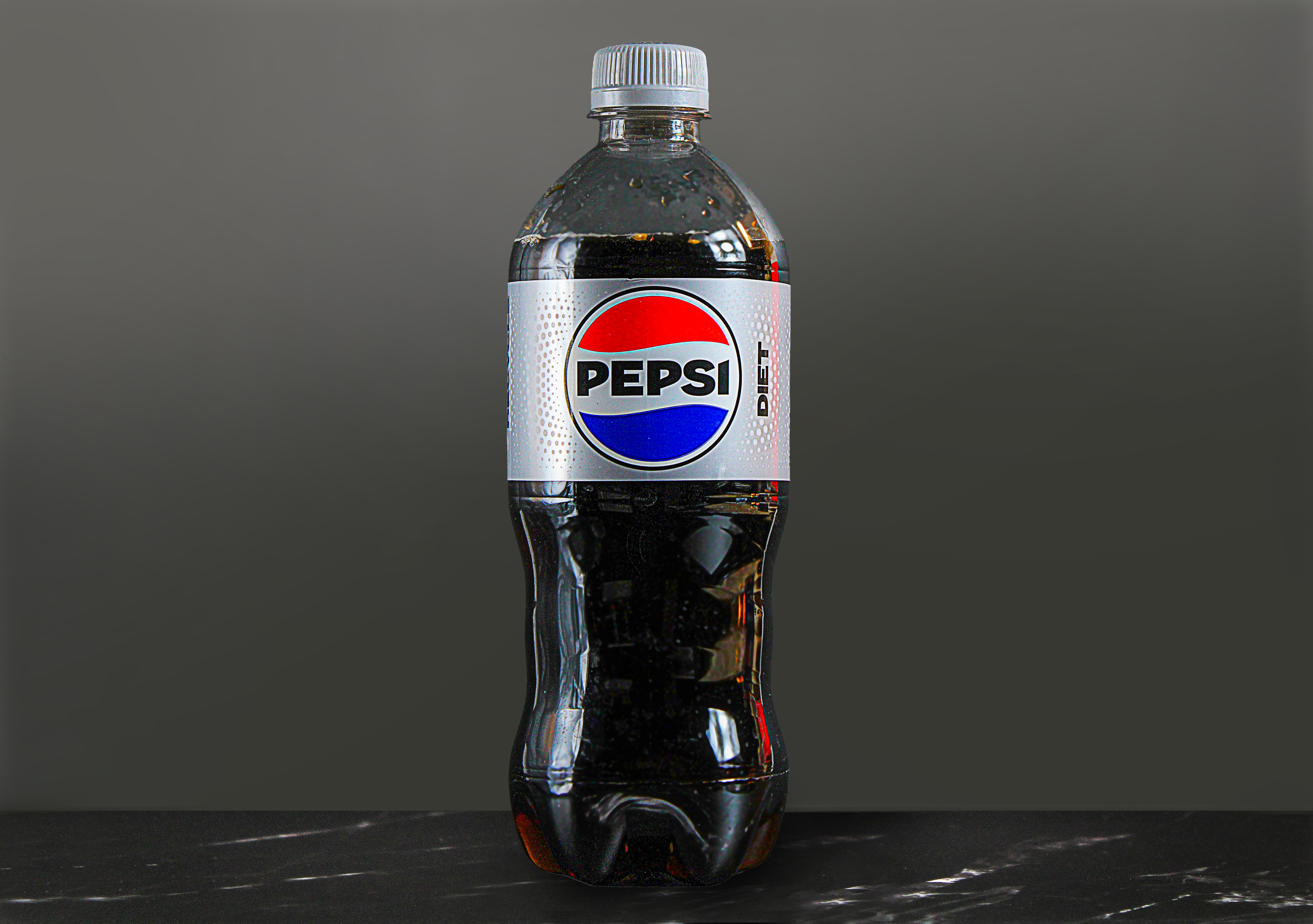
- A bottle of Diet Pepsi from America (2025)
- Product type: Diet cola
- Current owner: PepsiCo
- Country: United States
- Introduced: December 28, 1964; 61 years ago
- Related brands: Pepsi One; Pepsi Max; Coca-Cola Zero Sugar; Diet Coke
- Website: pepsi.com/products/diet-pepsi

Diet Pepsi, also called Pepsi Light in some countries, is a carbonated cola soft drink produced by PepsiCo. It is an alternative to Pepsi, containing no sugar, instead using artificial sweeteners (primarily aspartame). First test marketed in 1963 under the name Patio Diet Cola, it was re-branded as Diet Pepsi the following year, becoming the first diet cola to be distributed on a national scale in the United States before expanding internationally. In addition to Diet Pepsi, PepsiCo also produces the low-calorie cola Pepsi Zero Sugar, also called Pepsi Max in some areas, which was developed after Diet Pepsi.

== History ==
Diet Pepsi was originally test marketed in the United States under the name Patio in 1963. Following a positive reception attributed to the shifting dietary habits and preferences among Baby Boomers, the drink was launched nationally as Diet Pepsi the following year. It became the first diet cola to be distributed on a national scale in the US. The product sold 55 million cases nationally in 1966.

Distribution of the product has since expanded to other countries around the world. Diet Pepsi made its debut in the British market in 1983, where it is also referred to as Pepsi Diet. In many markets however, the beverage is or was marketed under the name Pepsi Light instead, including in Italy, Czechia, Poland, Argentina, Spain Greece, Turkey, Russia, Ukraine, and Brazil. This is not to be confused with a separate "Pepsi Light" that was introduced in the United States in 1975 as a cola with an added taste of lemon.

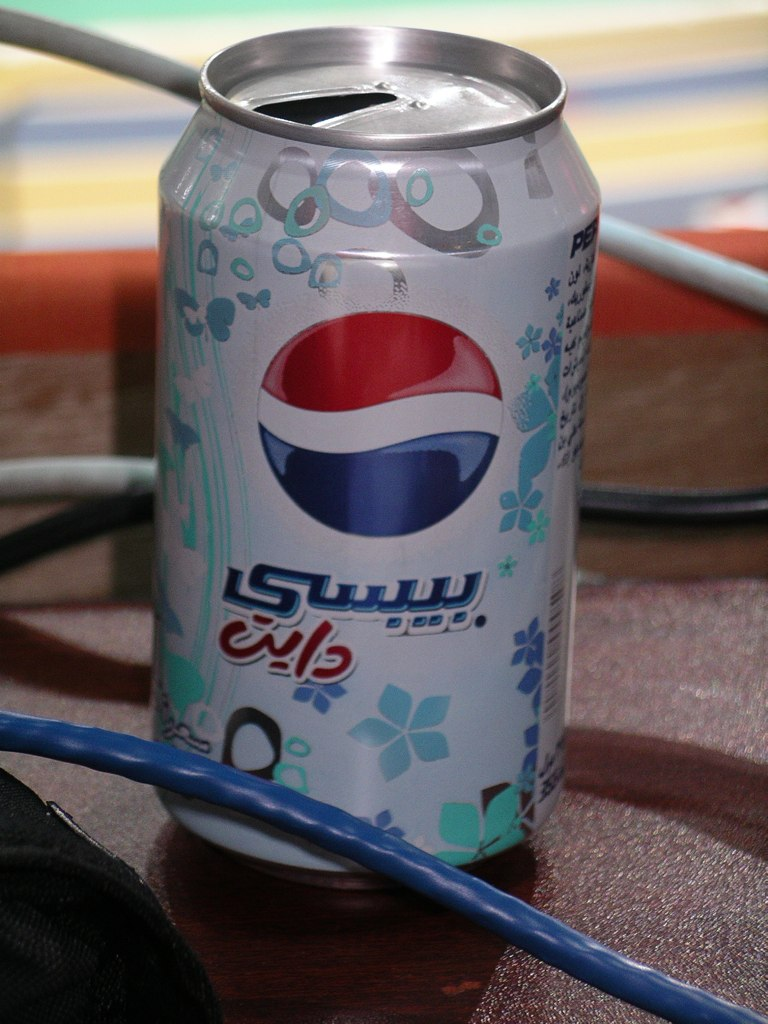
A Diet Pepsi can with Arabic branding

Diet Pepsi competed primarily with The Coca-Cola Company's Tab in the 1960s and 1970s; however, The Coca-Cola Company introduced Diet Coke in 1982, which has since been the principal competing product to Diet Pepsi. In 1986, Diet Pepsi was the fourth highest selling soft drink in America with a market share of 4.3 percent, one spot under Diet Coke which had 7.1 percent. In 2000, Diet Pepsi had a marginally higher share of 4.7 percent, but placed seventh in the ranking, below Dr Pepper, Sprite, and Mountain Dew (also from PepsiCo) in fourth, while its main competitor Diet Coke remained third. As of 2010, Diet Pepsi represented a 5.3 percent share of all carbonated soft drink sales in the United States, and was ranked as the #7 soft drink brand by volume. In the same year, Diet Coke was recorded as having a 9.9 percent market share.

PepsiCo introduced two further sugar-free cola drinks during the 1990s: Pepsi Max (primarily Europe) in 1993 and then Pepsi One (for the United States) in 1998. Both had a differing formulation compared to Diet Pepsi.

In December 2012, an AP article reported that Diet Pepsi was changing its sweetener to sucralose ahead of a major rebranding of the soft drink that was set for January 2013, but was quietly delayed to August 2015. In that same year, some people on Facebook and Twitter expressed their distaste for the new formula. In response, Pepsi revived its aspartame formulation, as "Diet Pepsi Classic Sweetener Blend" for US markets in September 2016, and it was sold alongside the new formula. PepsiCo later announced plans to revert Diet Pepsi's sweetener from sucralose to aspartame. The new formulation was released marketwide on February 25, 2018.

Selected former logos

1975–81

1986–91

2002–06

2014–23

== Flavor variations ==
Additional variations of Diet Pepsi/Pepsi Light have been introduced over the years since the drink's debut, wherein other flavors (such as wild cherry, vanilla, lemon, and lime) have been added to the cola. There is also a variant that has no caffeine: Caffeine-Free Diet Pepsi was the first Diet Pepsi variant and introduced by PepsiCo in 1982. Diet Pepsi Wild Cherry was launched in 1988. Both are still produced today.

In addition, other now-discontinued flavors have existed in the past such as Diet Pepsi Twist/Pepsi Twist Light Lemon (a diet version of Pepsi Twist), Diet Pepsi Vanilla (a diet version of Pepsi Vanilla), Diet Pepsi Lime, the Jazz sub-brand, and a number of limited editions.

== Composition ==
Diet Pepsi
Nutritional value per 12 fl oz (355 ml)
- Energy: 0 kcal (0 kJ)
- Carbohydrates: 0
- Sugars: 0
- Dietary fiber: 0
- Fat: 0
- Saturated: 0
- Trans: 0
- Protein: 0
Vitamins and minerals
Vitamins	Quantity %DV^{†}
Vitamin A equiv.	0% 0 μg
Vitamin C	0% 0 mg
Minerals	Quantity %DV^{†}
Calcium	0% 0 mg
Iron	0% 0 mg
Potassium	0% 0 mg
Sodium	2% 35 mg
- Other constituents: Quantity
- Cholesterol: 0
- ^{†}Percentages estimated using US recommendations for adults, except for potassium, which is estimated based on expert recommendation from the National Academies.

In the United States, Diet Pepsi is marketed as having zero calories, as FDA guidelines categorize products with fewer than five calories per serving to be labeled as containing "zero calories".

Though Diet Pepsi is represented worldwide as a low- or no-calorie beverage, the ingredients comprising its makeup vary in some cases by the country of origin. In the US, its ingredients are recorded as "carbonated water, caramel color, aspartame, phosphoric acid, potassium benzoate (preserves freshness), caffeine, citric acid, natural flavor, acesulfame potassium; phenylketonurics: contains phenylalanine". In Canada, the ingredient listing reads: "carbonated water, caramel color, phosphoric acid, aspartame (124 mg/355 ml, contains phenylalanine), sodium benzoate, caffeine, flavor, acesulfame potassium (32 mg/355ml), citric acid, dimethylpolysiloxane". Comparatively in the UK, Diet Pepsi is listed as consisting of "carbonated water, colour (caramel E150d), flavorings (including caffeine), phosphoric acid, sweeteners (aspartame, acesulfame K), acidity regulator (sodium citrate), preservative (sodium benzoate), citric acid, contains a source of phenylalanine".

The initial formulation of Diet Pepsi was sweetened with the artificial sweetener saccharin, although concerns over saccharin emerged in the 1970s, prompting a shift to an alternative sweetener, aspartame, which was marketed as the brand NutraSweet, in 1983. Aspartame has been the subject of controversy, most notably in 1996 following a 60 Minutes report on concerns alleging that aspartame might be linked to the development of brain tumors in humans. Critics of aspartame have expressed concerns that numerous health risks may be associated with its consumption; however, peer-reviewed comprehensive review articles and independent reviews by governmental regulatory bodies have analyzed the published research on the safety of aspartame and have described it as safe for consumption at current levels. Aspartame has been deemed safe for human consumption by regulatory agencies in their respective countries, including the U.S. Food and Drug Administration (FDA), the U.K. Food Standards Agency, the European Food Safety Authority (EFSA) and Health Canada.

== Packaging design ==
When it was first introduced in 1964, Diet Pepsi was packaged in glass bottles, and was also made available in can format. In 1994, Diet Pepsi became the first product to list a "freshness date" on each individual can and bottle, a practice that would later become a widespread standard in the packaged food and beverage industry. As of 2020, the product is distributed in plastic bottles, cans, and glass bottles, as well as via soda fountains in retail operations such as restaurants and convenience stores.

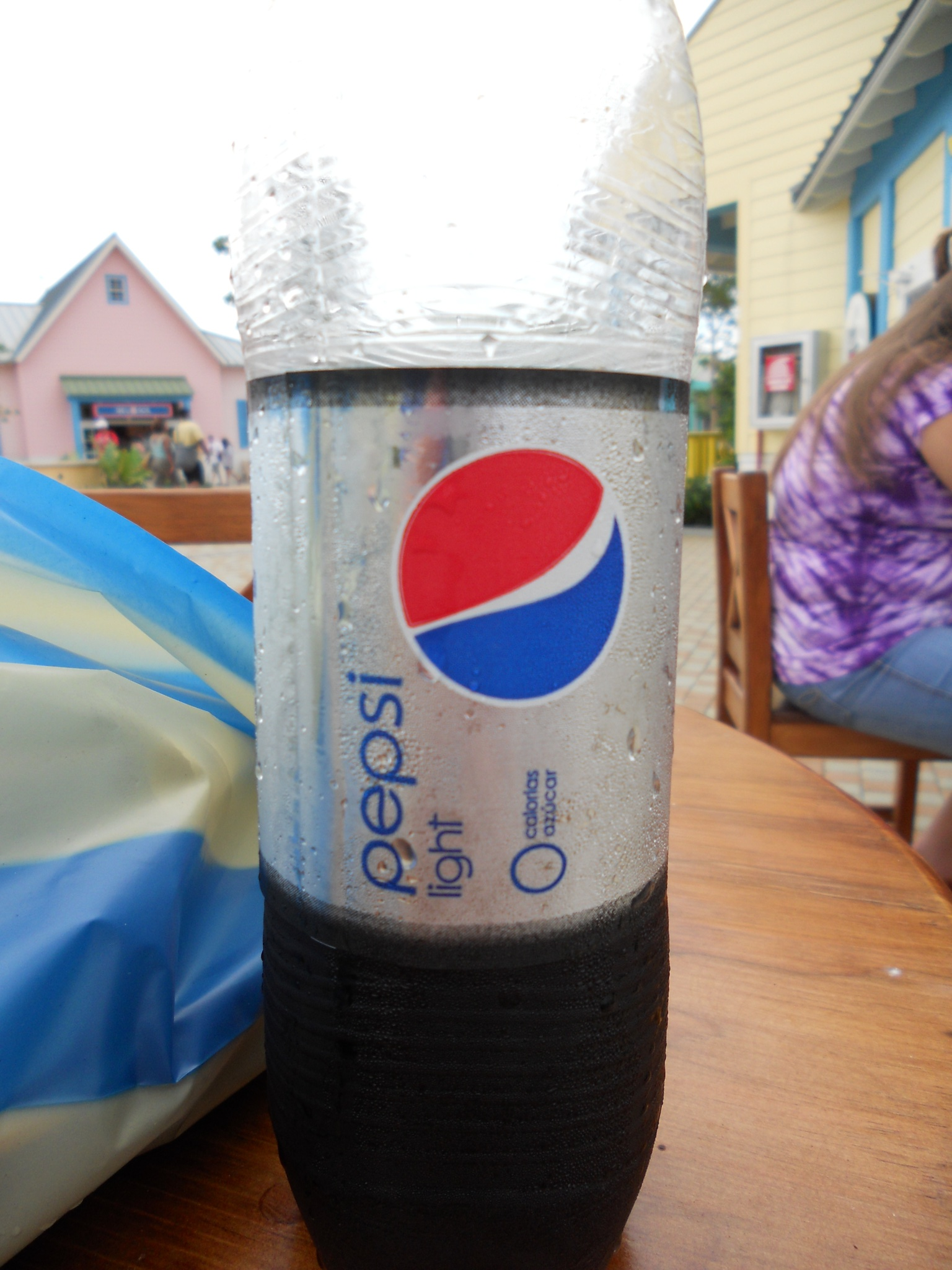
Bottle of Pepsi Light from 2009

The logo used in the packaging and advertisement of Diet Pepsi has changed multiple times since its original iteration. In October 2008, PepsiCo announced it would be redesigning its logo and re-branding many of its products, including Diet Pepsi. At this time the brand's blue and red Pepsi Globe logo became a series of "smiles," with the central white band arcing at different angles depending on the product. In the case of Diet Pepsi, the logo consisted of the small "smile". Starting in mid-2010, all Pepsi variants, both regular and diet, began using the original "smile" logo.

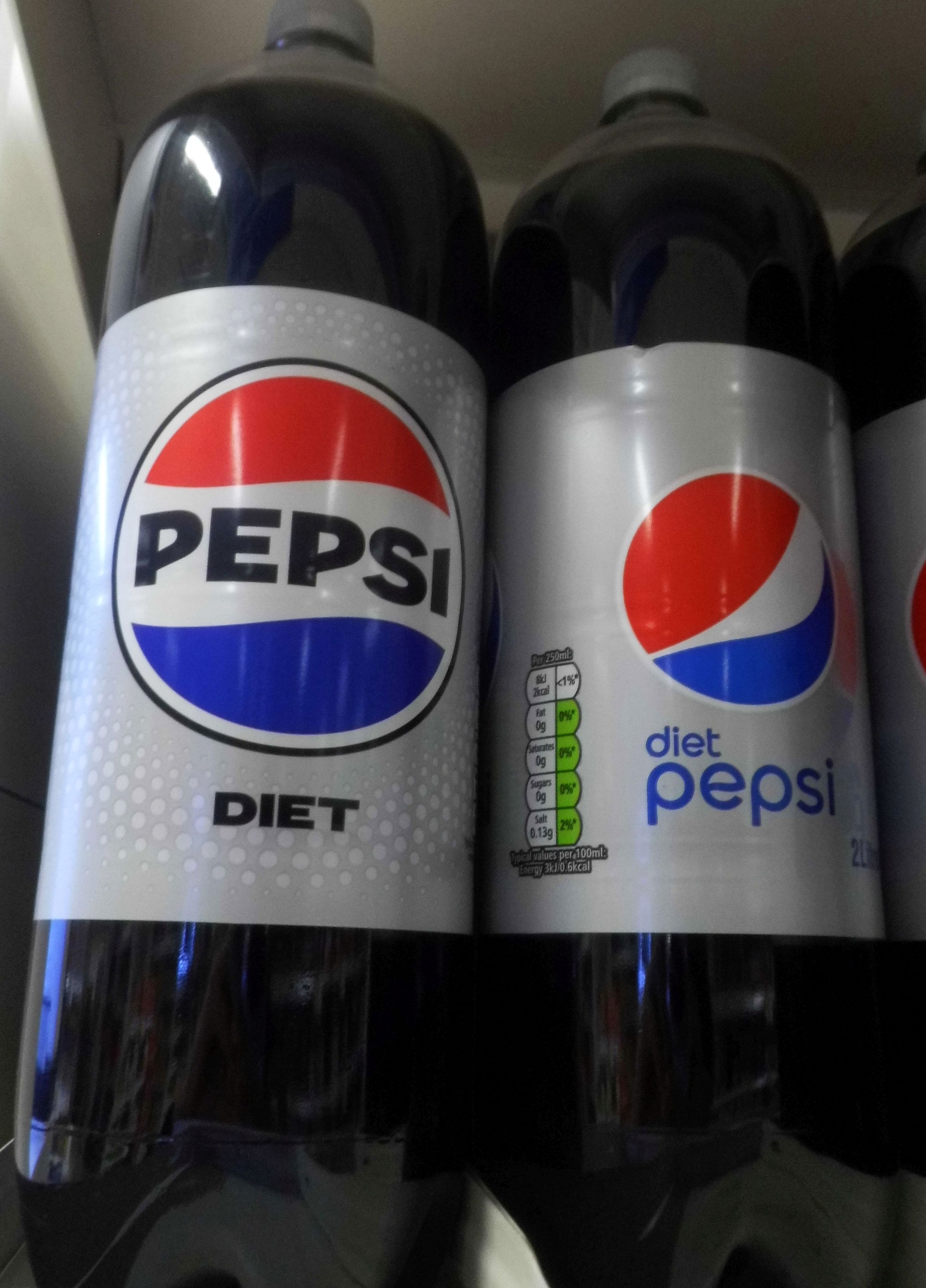
Bottles of Diet Pepsi with the older logo (right) and new since 2023 (left)

The Classic Sweetener Blend variety was distinguished by its use of the 2003–2006 wordmark along with the "smile" logo, and a light blue label background in contrast to the modern formulation's silver label. By mid-2017, packages of Classic Sweetener Blend dropped the 2003 wordmark and began using the modernized wordmark instead. With the restoration of aspartame as the main sweetener in the regular version, the alternate label was dropped, and packages bore the title "Classic Diet Pepsi Taste" which is very reminiscent to the "Coca-Cola Classic" title that was in use from 1985 to 2009, when New Coke received backlash.

== Advertising and promotion ==
While it was initially advertised alongside Pepsi, Diet Pepsi began to be promoted independently in the late 1960s. The first television advertisement to feature Diet Pepsi as a standalone product was "Girlwatchers," which placed focus on the cosmetic aspects of the beverage. The musical jingle from this ad generated popular culture appeal to the extent that it was eventually recorded and played on the radio, and later became a Top 40 hit.

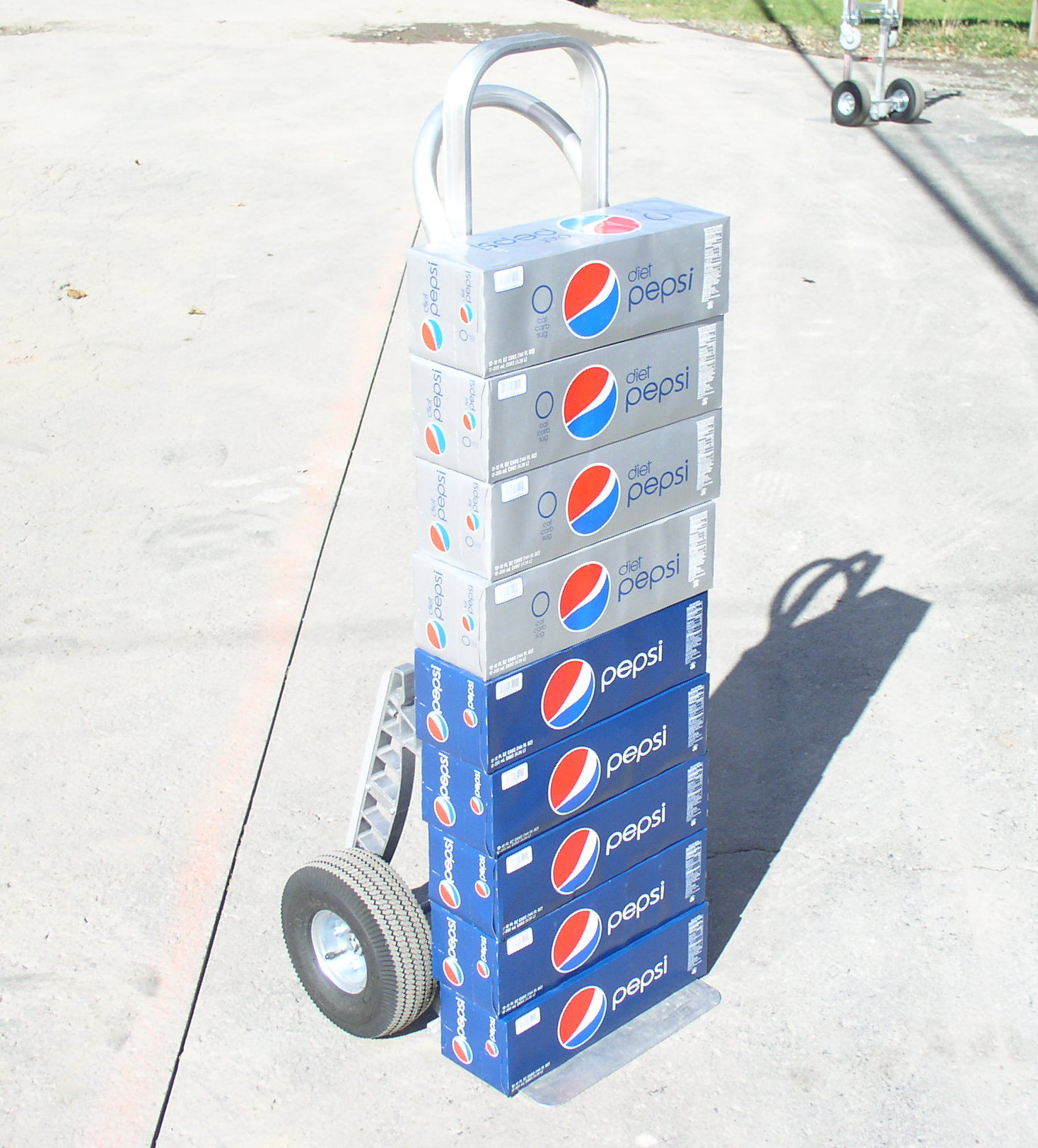
12-can packs of Pepsi and Diet Pepsi on a hand truck

Since its inception, musicians, professional athletes, actors and actresses have been featured prominently in the promotion of Diet Pepsi. In 1985, immediately following Super Bowl XIX, the game's respective quarterbacks, Joe Montana (of the San Francisco 49ers) and Dan Marino (of the Miami Dolphins), met in a hallway of what appeared to be a football stadium. Montana, of the winning 49ers, buys Marino a Diet Pepsi, and Marino promises to buy the drink the next time. A Diet Pepsi advertisement in the same year featured Geraldine Ferraro, the first woman to run for vice-president in the U.S. When the feature film Top Gun was released on home video cassette in 1987, it was promoted via television advertisements – consisting of a Top Gun pilot flying upside down while holding a bottle of Diet Pepsi – which were paid for by Pepsi. In exchange, the film's production studio, Paramount Pictures, included a 60-second Diet Pepsi advertisement on all Top Gun VHS tapes. The resulting cross-promotion was the first of its kind, and after it set record videocassette sales, it was described as "the beginning of a trend" by the Los Angeles Times.

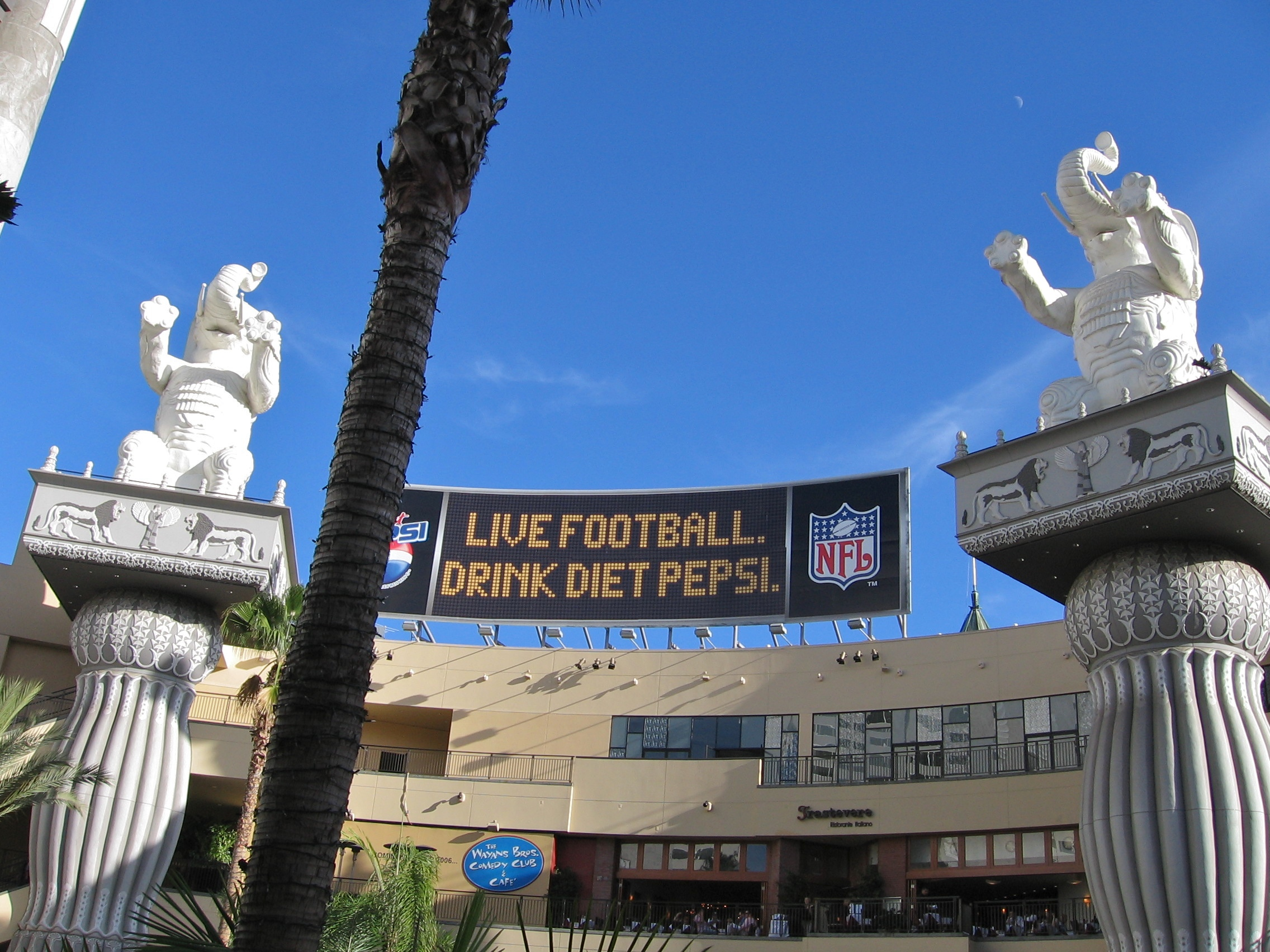
Diet Pepsi with NFL advertisement at Ovation Hollywood

In the late 1980s, Michael J. Fox appeared in commercials for Diet Pepsi, including a memorable commercial that featured him making a robot clone of himself. In that commercial, Fox's girlfriend (played by Lori Loughlin) shows up and accidentally hits Fox with the door, causing him to fall down a chute into the basement. The girlfriend takes the robot clone on a date and leaves the real Fox trapped.

During the early 1990s, R&B singer Ray Charles was featured in a series of Diet Pepsi ads featuring the brand's then-current tagline, "You got the right one, baby!" Supermodel Cindy Crawford became a recurring celebrity endorser for the Diet Pepsi brand at this time as well, beginning with a 1991 television ad in which she purchases a can of the drink from a vending machine on a hot summer day. Cindy Crawford was also brought back in 2002 to introduce a new packaging design for Diet Pepsi, and again in 2005 to promote the revised slogan "Light, crisp, refreshing" with an ad which debuted during Super Bowl XXXIX. In 2005 and 2006, recording artist Gwen Stefani appeared in advertisements related to a campaign in which codes printed underneath Diet Pepsi bottle caps could be redeemed for music downloads on Apple's iTunes Store.

== See also ==
- Cola wars
- Diet Coke
