= Coca-Cola C2 =

Cola-flavored beverage

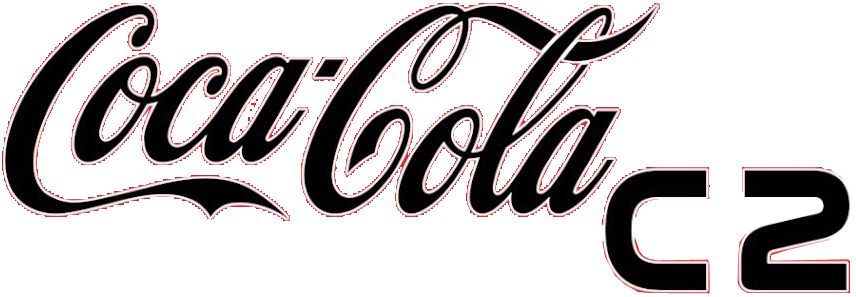

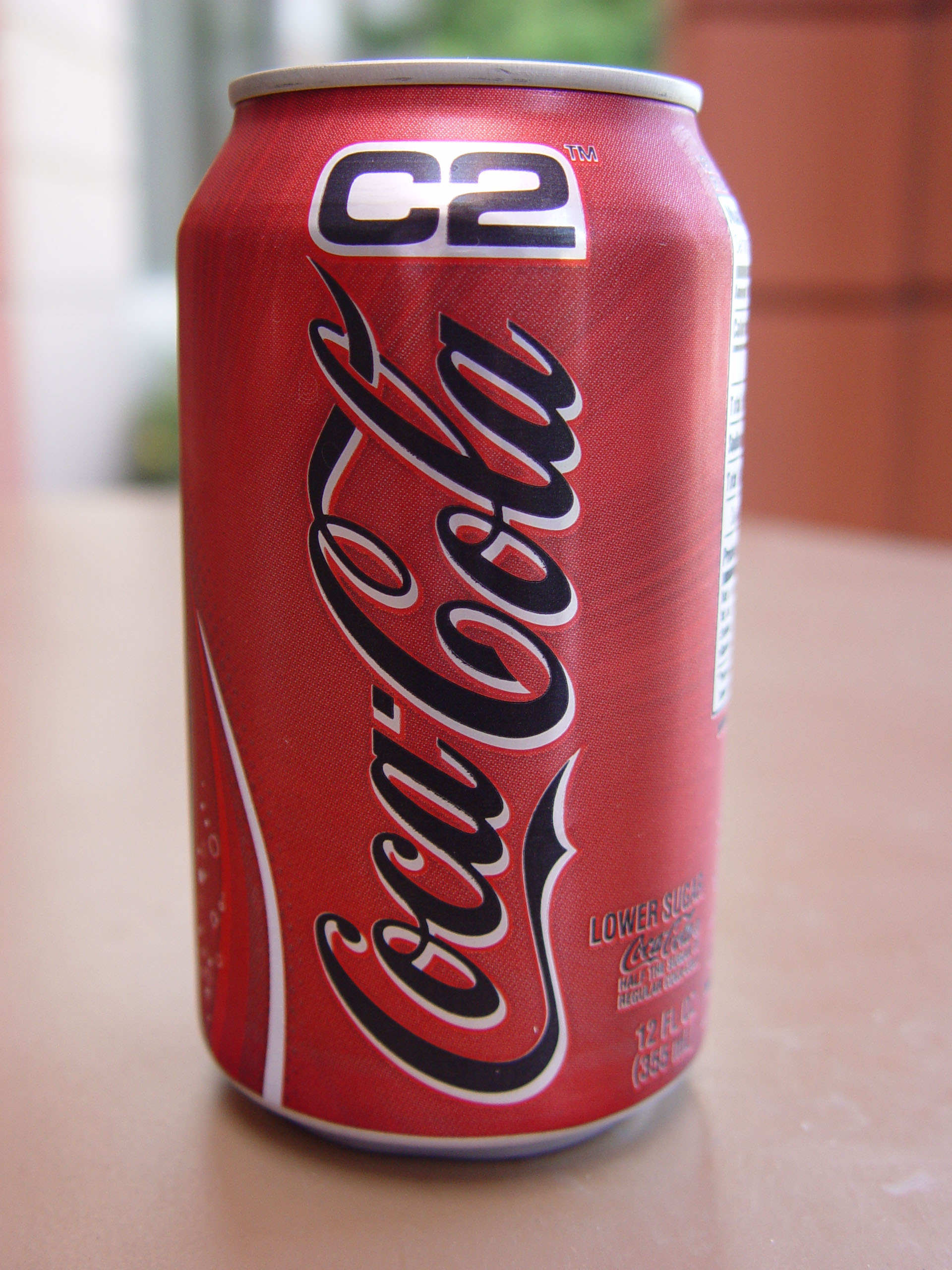
- Type: Diet soda
- Manufacturer: The Coca-Cola Company
- Origin: Japan
- Introduced: June 7, 2004; 22 years ago
- Discontinued: 2007; 19 years ago
- Related products: Coca-Cola Life, Pepsi ONE, Diet Coke, Coca-Cola Zero

Coca-Cola C2 was a cola-flavored beverage produced from 2004 to 2007 in response to the low-carbohydrate diet trend. This Coke product was marketed as having half the carbohydrates, sugars and calories of standard Coca-Cola. It was sweetened with aspartame, acesulfame potassium, and sucralose in addition to the high fructose corn syrup (and sugar in Japan) typically found in cola beverages distributed in America.

== History ==
Codenamed as "Coca-Cola Ultra", The Coca-Cola Company revealed C2 in April 2004, announcing that the drink would be released in Japan prior to its release in the United States.

The drink launched in Japan on June 7, 2004, with an advertising campaign featuring Japanese footballer Hidetoshi Nakata. The drink's launch in the United States at the end of the month was promoted on radio and television, and movie theaters initially using The Rolling Stones' "You Can't Always Get What You Want" and later Queen's "I Want to Break Free". Eight different NASCAR Cup Series drivers ran paint schemes in the 2004 Pepsi 400 race to promote the new drink. The drink was released in Canada shortly afterwards. A planned launch for C2 in the United Kingdom was abandoned in December 2004 after research found that the drink would overtake Diet Coke in sales.

American sales did not live up to early expectations mainly due to customers' lack of interest in a mid-calorie soda; however, Coca-Cola said the brand would remain in its lineup. Pepsi discontinued an equivalent product, Pepsi Edge, in late 2005, one year after its introduction.

By 2005, many store shelves completely replaced the product with Coca-Cola Zero due to display, shelving and storage limitations. The drink was silently discontinued in Japan in 2006 for similar reasons as in the United States, and by 2007 the drink had been replaced in stores by Coca-Cola Cherry Zero.

In 2013, The Coca-Cola Company introduced a similar product, Coca-Cola Life, a mid-calorie variant of Coca-Cola sweetened with stevia leaf extract in addition to sugar or corn syrup. Coca-Cola Life, while more available than C2 had been, had similar low sales and was discontinued by 2020.

== See also ==
- List of defunct consumer brands
