= Coca-Cola Lime =

Coca-Cola variant

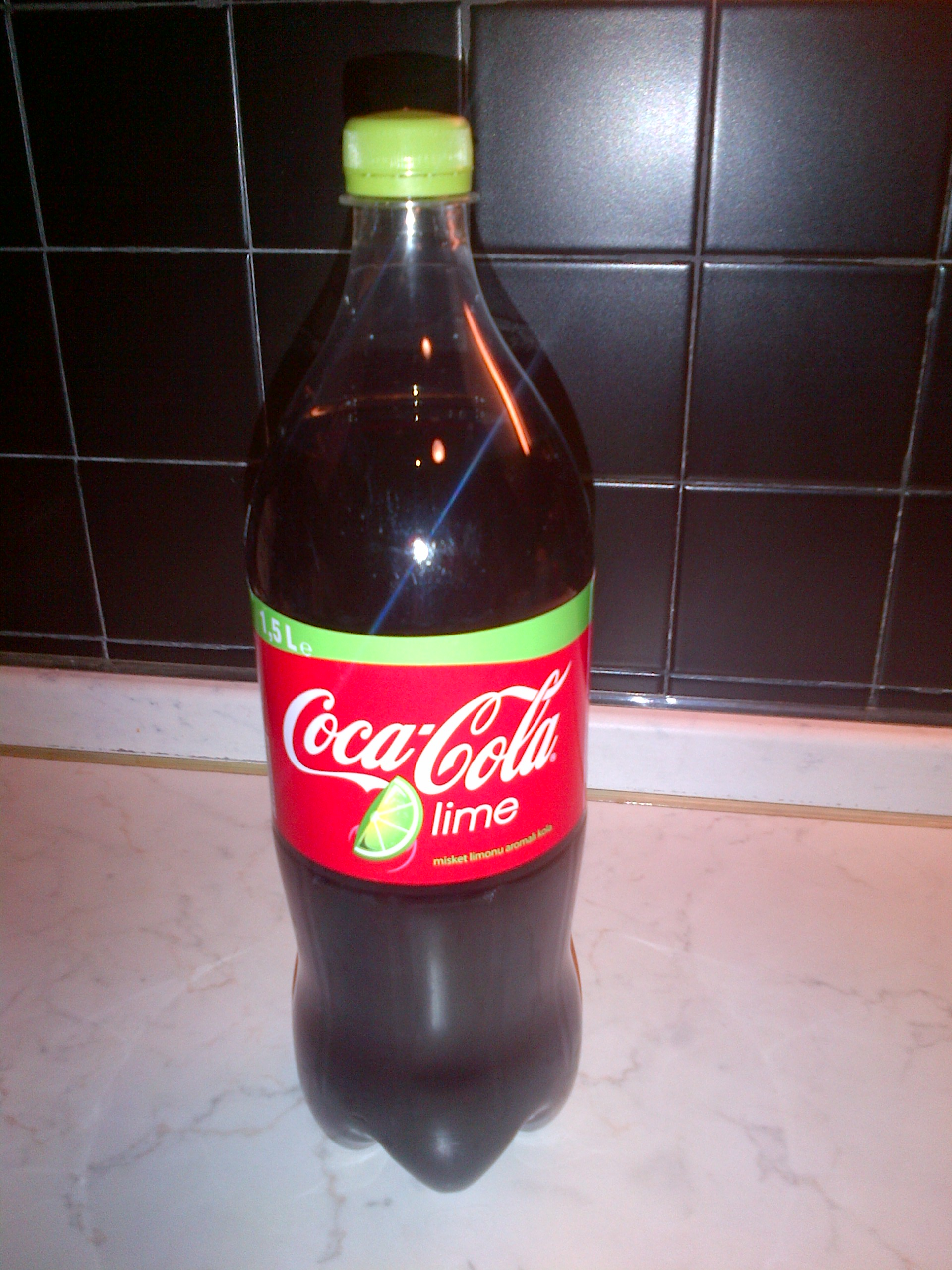
- 1.5 L bottle sold in Turkey (2015)
- Product type: Lime-flavored cola
- Current owner: The Coca-Cola Company
- Country: Worldwide
- Introduced: 2004 (Diet); 2005 (regular); 2019 (Zero Sugar)
- Related brands: Coca-Cola Lemon; Diet Coke with Citrus Zest

Coca-Cola Lime is a soft drink produced by The Coca-Cola Company. It is a version of the original Coca-Cola containing lime flavoring. There also exist non-sugar variations based on Diet Coke or Coca-Cola Zero Sugar. Lime was the fourth flavor to be launched by the company in their line of cola products after the launches of Cherry, Lemon and Vanilla. Besides being sold in cans and bottles, Coca-Cola Lime can also be created in Coca-Cola Freestyle machines.

== Diet/Light version ==
The diet version of the drink, based on Diet Coke/Coca-Cola Light, was the first to be released. In January 2004, The Coca-Cola Company announced the release of the drink, entitled Diet Coke with Lime. The drink remained a popular variety all the way until 2018, when the drink was discontinued as part of Diet Coke's relaunch in favor of Diet Coke Ginger Lime, a variant with added ginger flavoring, which itself was sold canned until 2020 but continues to be available on Coca-Cola Freestyle. In October 2025 and March 2026, The Coca-Cola Company announced that the drink would return to store shelves until the end of the year. This limited-time release features retro-style packaging, similar to the re-release of Diet Cherry Coke at the beginning of the year.

Great Britain was the first territory outside North America to get the drink, which was released in March 2005. The international expansion continued with its release in the Netherlands in May 2005, Sweden, France, Belgium and Fiji throughout 2005 and 2006, all under the name of Coca-Cola Light Lime. In February 2007 it was withdrawn from the British market alongside Diet Coke With Lemon, in favour of Diet Coke with Citrus Zest, a variant that blended lemon and lime flavors. That same year, it was also discontinued in the Danish market.

In February 2020, the drink returned to Britain as Diet Coke Sublime Lime, and it also returned that year to Denmark as Coca-Cola Light Taste Lime.

== Regular version ==
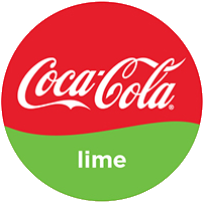
Logo as seen on Coca-Cola fountains

The version based on classic Coca-Cola was released as Coca-Cola with Lime in the United States and Canada in the first quarter of 2005. The decision to market the product was based on popular feedback from consumers. An advertisement of Coca-Cola with Lime first appeared on television during the March 7, 2005 broadcast of American Idol. The advert used Harry Nilsson's hit song Coconut in an edited and slightly altered form with the mondegreen "You put the lime in the Coke, you nut."

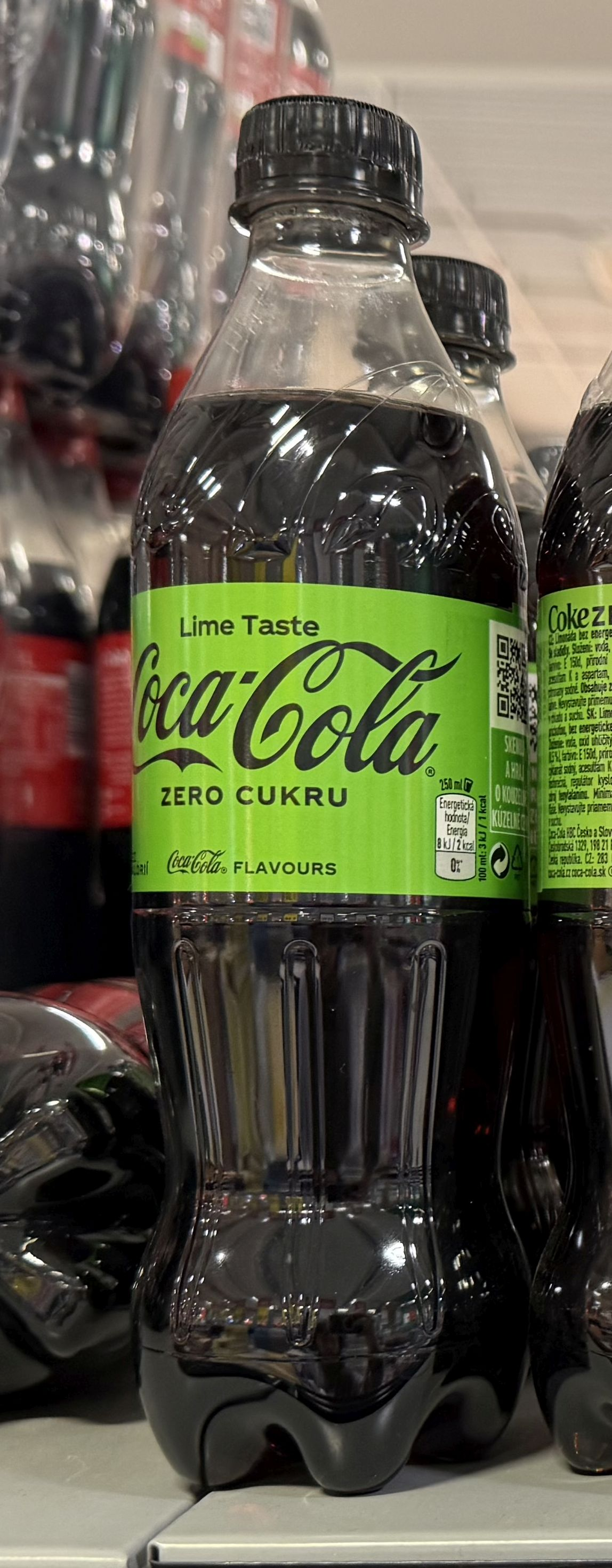
A bottle of Coca-Cola Zero Sugar Lime Taste in Czechia (2024)

Coca-Cola with Lime was released as a limited edition in Australia, at the same time as its American debut, in 2005. However, it proved quite unpopular with some larger retailers such as Woolworths and Coles, who bought in bulk, having to reduce the price considerably (50c for a 1.25 L bottle compared to around A$2 for all other varieties) to clear the product out. Despite a marketing push, it was a failure and discontinued by early 2006. Singapore became the third region after North America and Australia to receive the drink, in 2005. In 2021, it was back in the country for a limited time at 7-Eleven stores.

Coca-Cola with Lime had limited releases in many European countries. It saw a limited edition release in Great Britain in the summer of 2006, after the success of Coca-Cola with Lemon the year before, and was available in green bottles. However, it was not made permanent at the time. The drink launched in Turkey in 2014, exclusive at Migros stores.

Lime had also began distribution in Poland in April 2017, and then in Romania returned to market in April 2024, a few years after discontinuation. Coca-Cola Lime returned to the British market in January 2025 after seventeen years, alongside its Zero Sugar counterpart. In 2025, the drink was introduced in Serbia and Montenegro.

== Zero Sugar version ==
Coca-Cola Zero Sugar Lime, which is based on the Coca-Cola Zero Sugar formulation, has also been produced. It has been released in 2021 in Turkey, 2022 in territories including Sweden, Portugal, and in 2025 in Britain.

In 2024, Coca-Cola Lime Zero Sugar launched in Australia and Thailand.
