= List of Pepsi variations =

List of sodas

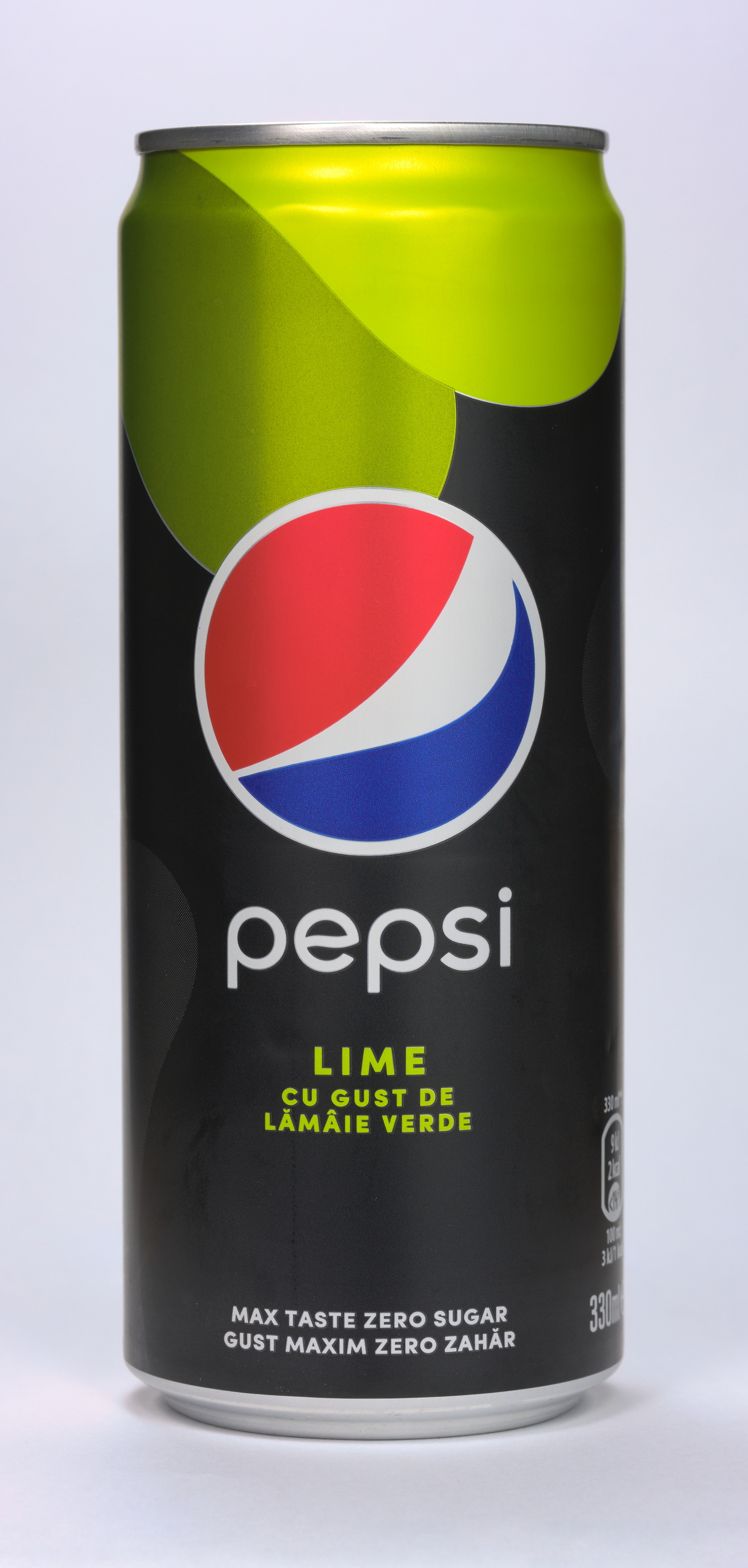
A 330 milliliter can of the variation Pepsi Lime

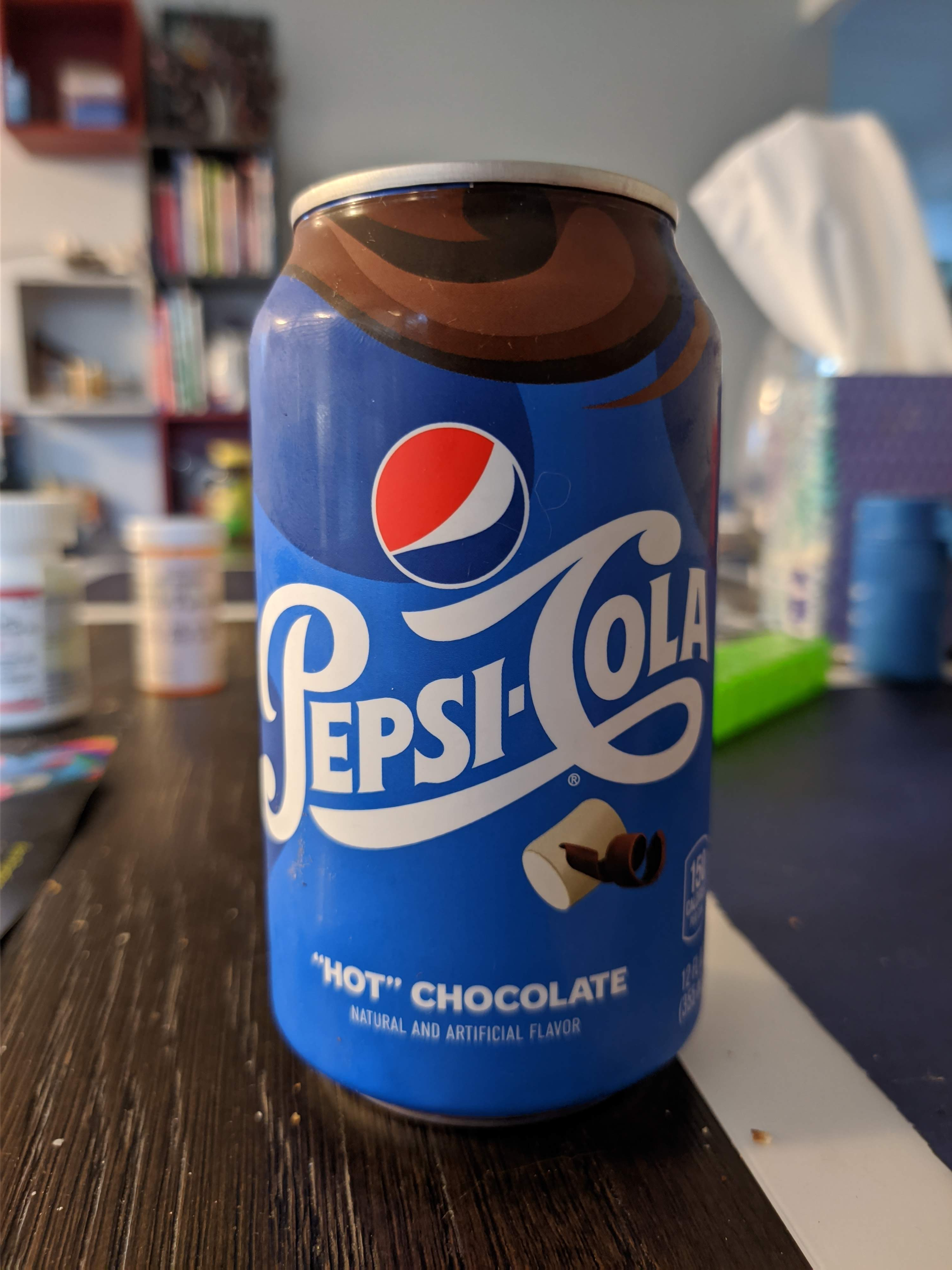
The front of a Pepsi "Hot" Chocolate can

PepsiCo has produced a number of variations on its primary cola, Pepsi, over the years, including the following:

== Regular varieties ==
=== North America ===
Name	Launched	Notes
Pepsi	1898; 1961	PepsiCo's signature cola product. It has been released in its current form since 1961.
Caffeine-Free Pepsi	1982	Pepsi without the caffeine. It was first introduced in 1982 as Pepsi Free but was changed to its current name in 1987.
Pepsi Wild Cherry	1988	Pepsi with cherry flavoring. It was known under the slightly different name of Wild Cherry Pepsi until 2005. It is available in the United States, Canada, and Russia.
Pepsi AM	1989	A variant of Pepsi that contained 25% extra caffeine and was marketed as a morning drink. It was introduced in test markets in August 1989, but was discontinued in October 1990 due to poor sales and reception.
Pepsi Raging Razzberry	1991	Pepsi with raspberry flavoring. It was released as part of the "Pepsi Wild Bunch" - A range of flavored colas test-marketed in the United States from February–April 1991. The soda was said to taste like a burst of raspberry rather than an actual raspberry flavor.
Pepsi Strawberry Burst	1991	Pepsi with strawberry flavoring. It was released as part of the "Pepsi Wild Bunch" - A range of flavored colas test-marketed in the United States from February–April 1991.
Pepsi Tropical Chill	1991	Pepsi with orange/pineapple tropical mix flavoring. It was released as part of the "Pepsi Wild Bunch" - A range of flavored colas test-marketed in the United States from February–April 1991.
Crystal Pepsi	1992	A clear cola that was sold for a short time between 1992 and 1993. It returned in 2015 as part of a limited sweepstakes promotion and has been re-released several times since.
Crystal (from the makers of Pepsi)	1994	A clear citrus/cola hybrid cola that was sold for a short time in 1994 until the end of the year.
Pepsi Kona	1996	Pepsi with coffee flavoring. It was test-marketed in the Philadelphia region from May 1996 until 1997, which due to low sales never led to a full release.
Pepsi Candy	1999	Pepsi with fruity sweet flavoring. It was sold in Canada in spring 1999.
Pepsi Twist	2000	Pepsi with lemon flavoring. It was first released in 2000, and was discontinued in 2006. It is still sold in many countries outside the United States. It was re-released as Pepsi NFL Kickoff in 2008 to promote the NFL kickoffs.
Pepsi Blue	2002	A blue-colored, fruity/berry-flavored soda which is described as a "Berry Cola Fusion" in marketing. It was given a huge marketing push akin to other similar varieties of rival brands (e.g., Vanilla Coke, Dr Pepper Red Fusion), but would end up being a huge flop, being discontinued in 2004. It is still available in some countries and was re-released in the United States for the summer of 2021 for a limited time.
Pepsi Vanilla	2003	Pepsi with vanilla flavoring. It was released in the US and Canada in 2003 as Pepsi's answer to Vanilla Coke. It was eventually discontinued by 2005, but was relaunched in 2019 and is still available in some parts of the US. It is also available in Hungary.
Pepsi Lime	2004	Pepsi with lime flavoring. It was introduced in 2004 and was discontinued by 2006. It was later re-released as a standard limited edition variety for the spring of 2019, but was later re-released permanently. It was also available in the Philippines, Thailand and Cambodia.
Pepsi Holiday Spice	2004	Pepsi with a cinnamon finish, somewhat similar to the Swedish Julmust. It was released on 1 November 2004 in the US and Canada as a limited edition, 8-week-long Christmas variety. It was sold again during the 2006 holiday season. It was later responded that there will be no more plans to return this flavor to the markets in the near future.
Pepsi Summer Mix	2007	Pepsi with tropical Fruit flavoring. It was released for the summer of 2007 in limited areas of the United States. It was a big hit for the northeastern United States.
Pepsi Natural	2009	Pepsi with natural ingredients and flavoring, and is sweetened with sugar instead of high-fructose corn syrup. It is a slightly modified version of Pepsi Raw. It was released in 2009 and was discontinued soon afterwards.
Pepsi-Cola Soda Shop	2009	A version of Pepsi-Cola that is sweetened with sugar instead of high-fructose corn syrup and lacking citric acid. It was first introduced as Pepsi Throwback in May 2009 as a limited edition and was sold again throughout 2010–2011, until becoming permanent. It was rebranded to Pepsi-Cola Made with Real Sugar in June 2014, and has been rebranded again to Pepsi-Cola Soda Shop Made with Real Sugar in early 2024 to fit in with PepsiCo's Soda Shop series of sugar-sweetened cola.
Pepsi Cherry Vanilla	2010	Pepsi with cherry vanilla flavoring. It was released for the summer of 2010 for eight weeks, and was re-released in February 2016 for Valentines Day.
Pepsi X	2012	Pepsi with dragon fruit flavoring. It was released as a limited edition in the fall of 2012 to promote the second season of the US version of The X Factor. It was sweetened with a blend of corn syrup, acesulfame potassium, and Sucralose.
Pepsi-Cola Made with Real Sugar Vanilla	2014	Pepsi with vanilla flavoring. It is a sugar-sweetened version of Pepsi Vanilla, and was released for the summer of 2014 as a limited edition.
Pepsi-Cola Made with Real Sugar Cherry	2014	Pepsi with cherry flavoring. It is a sugar-sweetened version of Pepsi Wild Cherry, and was released for the summer of 2014 as a limited edition.
Pepsi Ginger	2016	A variety that blended cola with Ginger Ale. It was sold in Canada for a short time from April 2016 and became well known during the time it was sold for its strong ginger taste.
Pepsi 1893 Original Cola	2016	A discontinued variant on the original Pepsi with a combination of kola nuts, sugar, and sparkling water. It was released as part of the Pepsi 1893 line, which features variants on the original Pepsi formulation by Caleb Bradham.
Pepsi 1893 Ginger Cola	2016	A discontinued Pepsi 1893 variant with ginger flavoring. It is also sold in Canada as Pepsi Ginger Cola.
Pepsi 1893 Black Currant Cola	2017	Pepsi 1893 variant with currant and berry flavoring. It was soft launched in February 2017, but was discontinued at the end of the year.
Pepsi 1893 Citrus Cola	2017	Pepsi 1893 variant with grapefruit flavoring. It was soft-launched in February 2017, but was discontinued at the end of the year.
Pepsi Fire	2017	Pepsi with cinnamon infusion. It was sold for a limited time in the summer of 2017.
Pepsi Salted Caramel	2017	Pepsi with caramel flavoring. It was sold from November 2017 to the end of the year for the holiday season.
Pepsi Berry	2019	Pepsi with berry flavoring. It was first sold as a standard limited edition variety in spring 2019. later, it was released permanently.
Pepsi Mango	2019	Pepsi with mango flavoring. It was first sold as a standard limited edition variety in spring 2019. later, it was released again as a permanent flavor until being discontinued in January 2025.
Pepsi Pineapple	2019	Pepsi with pineapple flavoring. It was released in the spring of 2019, as a limited edition available exclusively at Walmart stores, and returned for a limited time in the Summer of 2023 as part of a promotion exclusively with Little Caesars. It returned as a Little Caesars exclusive again in the summer of 2024 in 20-ounce bottles rather than in cans.
Pepsi Apple Pie	2020	Pepsi with artificial cinnamon and apple flavoring. It was available as part of a social media contest in 2020.
Pepsi Hot Chocolate	2021	Pepsi with hot chocolate flavoring. It was given out as a limited edition to people who participated on National Hot Chocolate Day using the #nationalhotchocolateday and #pepsioffer on January 31, 2021. Only 2000 cans of this flavor are known to exist. This soda is said to taste like the classic American chocolate cola (putting chocolate syrup in cola) but with a mild liquorice taste.
Pepsi Peeps	2021	Pepsi with marshmallow flavoring. It was released as a limited edition sweepstakes in collaboration with Peeps marshmallow treats for the 2021 Easter season. In February 2023, it was re-released in stores for a limited time.
Pepsi-Cola Soda Shop Cream Soda	2021	Pepsi with cream soda flavoring. It was released as part of the Pepsi Soda Shop series of sugar-sweetened colas as a limited edition from September 2021. The drink was made available for a limited time again in November 2022.
Pepsi-Cola Soda Shop Black Cherry	2021	Pepsi with black cherry flavoring. It was released as part of the Pepsi Soda Shop series of sugar-sweetened colas as a limited edition from September 2021. The drink was made available for a limited time again in November 2022.
Nitro Pepsi Original Cola	2022	Nitrogen-infused version of Pepsi released in March 2022 and discontinued in January 2025.
Nitro Pepsi Vanilla	2022	Nitrogen-infused version of Pepsi with vanilla flavoring released in March 2022 and discontinued in January 2025.
Pepsi Maple Syrup	2022	A Maple Syrup flavored Pepsi released as part of a limited edition sweepstakes with IHOP Maple Syrup in March 2022. It was released again for a limited time in April 2024 as an IHOP exclusive in the form of a fountain drink or as an ice cream float.
Pepsi S'mores Toasty Marshmallow	2022	Pepsi with artificial marshmallow flavoring. It was available as a limited edition for the 2022 holiday season.
Pepsi S'mores Chocolate	2022	Pepsi with chocolate flavoring. It was available as a limited edition for the 2022 holiday season.
Pepsi S'mores Graham Cracker	2022	Pepsi with artificial Graham Cracker flavoring. It was available as a limited edition for the 2022 holiday season.
Pepsi Peach	2024	Pepsi with Peach flavoring. Released as a limited edition flavor on April 22, 2024 along with the return of Pepsi Lime.
Pepsi Wild Cherries and Cream	2025	Pepsi with cherry and vanilla cream flavoring released in January 2025 along with a zero sugar version.
Pepsi Floats	2025	An ice cream float Pepsi flavor released in 2025 as part of a new Floats series of PepsiCo beverages, including Pepsi Floats, Mtn Dew Floats, and Mug Root Beer Floats.
Pepsi Maple Cola	2026	A maple sugar flavored cola with a limited 4 week run only in Canada starting early January. No indication if this is the same flavor introduced in the US in 2022.

=== Europe ===
Name	Launched	Notes
Pepsi Chill	1993	A Cherry-flavored variant sold in Australia as a limited edition for the summer.
Pepsi Slam	1993	A Strawberry-flavored variant sold in Australia as a limited edition for the summer.
Pepsi Rage	1993	A Raspberry-flavored variant sold in Australia as a limited edition for the summer.
Pepsi Punch	1994	A sweet coconut and fruit punch-flavored variant. It was sold in the UK and France for a short amount of time in 1994.
Pepsi Strawberry	1994	A strawberry-flavored variant. It was sold in the UK and France for a short amount of time in 1994.
Pepsi Tropical	1994	A pineapple and sweet orange-flavored variant. It was sold in the UK and France for a short amount of time in 1994.
Pepsi Peach	1996	A sweet peach-flavored variant with a hint of cream soda. It was sold in Portugal in 1996 and was discontinued shortly after due to low sales.
Pepsi Boom	1991	A repackaging of Caffeine Free Pepsi aimed at the child demographic. It was sold in Germany, Italy, and Spain until 2019, when it was rebranded under the standard Caffeine Free Pepsi name. It was also sold in France as Pepsi Cool from 1991 until being discontinued in the country in 2010s.
Pepsi La Liga	2000	A kola-flavored variant that was sold as a limited edition in Spain to promote La Liga in 2000.
Pepsi Blue	2000s	A blue-colored, fruity/berry-flavored variant. It has been sold in countries such as Bulgaria, Denmark, Finland, Italy, Romania, Hungary, and Turkey.
Pepsi Cappuccino	2000s	A coffee-flavored variant. It was sold in Russia, Romania, and other various parts of Europe during the 2000s. It is also known as Pepsi Café Chino.
Pepsi X Energy Cola	2004	An energy drink variant that contained extra caffeine, a unique flavor, and a reddish tint. It was first test-marketed in the Netherlands before being available in several countries such as Russia, Sweden, Denmark, Vietnam, and Brazil.
Pepsi Ice Cream	2005	A vanilla-flavored variant that was sold in Russia. It reportedly tasted like cream soda.
Pepsi Samba	2005	A tropical fruit-flavored variant containing the flavors mango and tamarind. It was released in Australia as a limited edition for 2005.
Pepsi Clear	2005	A clear-colored variant that was released in Mexico as a limited edition for the Christmas season in 2005. It is the Mexican equivalent of Crystal Pepsi.
Pepsi Gold	2006	A ginger-hinted, gold-colored variant that was released for 2006 FIFA World Cup and ICC Cricket World Cup 2007 promotions in Southeast Asia, Central Europe, Finland, Russia, Turkey, and the Middle East. For the 2010 FIFA World Cup, the drink was re-released as Pepsi Cheer.
Pepsi Summer Chill	2007	An apple-flavored variant that was sold in Poland as a limited edition for the summer of 2007. In the Czech Republic and Slovakia, it was sold as Pepsi Ice.
Pepsi Fresh	2007	A fresh-cola variant that was sold for the summers of 2007 and 2008 in Russia.
Pepsi Raw	2008	A variant made with all-natural ingredients and no artificial colours. It was first sold in the UK in 2008, but was withdrawn from the market in September 2010.
Pepsi Jaffa	2009	An orange-flavored variant that was available for short time in the Netherlands and the North of Belgium, in restaurants and cafes in 2009. It was only available as a fountain drink.
Pepsi Mojito	2009	An alcohol-free, lemon-mint variant. It was sold in Italy as a limited edition for the summer of 2009.
Pepsi Ginga	2014	A citrus-flavored variant inspired by Brazilian culture. It was sold as a limited summer edition for 2014 in Romania and Denmark.
Pepsi Lime Mint	2021	A lime and mint-flavored variant available in Poland, Estonia and Finland since 2021.
Pepsi Pineapple Mint	2022	A pineapple and mint-flavored variant released in the Czech Republic and Romania during the summer of 2022.

=== Japan ===
Name	Launched	Notes
Pepsi Carnival	2006	A tropical fruit-flavored Pepsi available in Japan for a limited time that debuted in summer 2006. The same concept was later released as Pepsi Summer Mix in 2007 in the US, although the formula was most likely different.
Pepsi Red	2006	Released alongside Pepsi Gold in November 2006, this variant had a somewhat spicy ginger flavor.
Pepsi Gold	2006	Released alongside Pepsi Red in November 2006, this variant had a mild ginger flavor.
Pepsi Ice Cucumber	2007	A limited edition green, cucumber-flavored Pepsi sold in summer 2007.
Pepsi Blue Hawaii	2008	A summer 2008 limited edition, pineapple and lemon-flavored Pepsi, blue in color.
Pepsi White	2008	A limited edition variant with yogurt flavor, sold in winter 2008. It was released again for a limited time in winter 2012 with a mandarin orange flavor. Another variant called White Cola Pepsi was released in 2015, with a light citrus flavor similar to the 2012 version.
Pepsi Shiso	2009	A limited edition green shiso-flavored soda sold during summer 2009.
Pepsi Azuki	2009	An azuki bean-flavored limited edition Pepsi released on October 20, 2009.
Pepsi Baobab	2010	A baobab tree fruit-flavored, limited edition Pepsi released on May 25, 2010.
Pepsi Strong Shot	2010	A limited edition Pepsi released in 2010 with a high concentration of caffeine and extra carbonation. Followed up on in 2015 with Pepsi Strong and Pepsi Strong Zero. These were sold in larger sizes and with an even higher concentration of caffeine and carbonation. This was further followed up on in May 2016 with Pepsi Strong 5.0 GV, a soda so carbonated that a new bottle had to be designed to contain it.
Pepsi Mont Blanc	2010	A limited edition Pepsi based on the French chestnut dessert. Sold for a limited time from October 2010.
Pepsi Dry	2011	A limited edition non-sweet (but not completely sugar-free) bitter Pepsi variant released by Suntory on May 24, 2011.
Pepsi Caribbean Gold	2011	A limited edition, golden-colored, white sapote fruit-flavored Pepsi released on July 26, 2011.
Pepsi Pink	2011	A limited edition pink, strawberry milk-flavored Pepsi released on November 8, 2011, for a limited time. It was released again in 2014.
Pepsi Black	2012	A soda similar to Pepsi Dry, with 50% less sugar than regular Pepsi, and blacker in color, released in summer 2012, by Suntory.
Pepsi Extra	2012	A caffeinated variant of Pepsi sold in 200 ml cans in summer 2012. The same concept was later released in 2019 as Pepsi Refresh Shot.
Pepsi Salty Watermelon	2012	A watermelon flavored Pepsi, sold in Japan in June 2012 for a limited time only.
Pepsi Special	2012	Contains an ingredient to limit the absorption of fat. Sold in June 2012.
Pepsi Refresh Shot	2013	A caffeinated variant of Pepsi. Sold in May 2013.
Pepsi Special Lemon Mint	2015	A limited edition Pepsi released in the summer of 2015. It was a zero calorie soda touted to meet the Food for Specified Health Uses (FOSHU) standards.
Pepsi Ghost	2015	Released on October 6, 2015. The bottles featured Halloween themed labels, while the flavor was an unidentified mystery flavor.
Pepsi American Cherry	2015	A cherry flavored Pepsi, sold in June 2015 for Aeon group limited only.
Pepsi Sakura	2016	A floral cherry blossom flavored Pepsi, released in March 2016.
Pepsi Christmas Cola	2017	A limited edition, Christmas-themed Pepsi released November 21, 2017. While not cake batter-flavored, the creamy white cola and strawberry combination is reminiscent of the whipped cream and strawberries of a traditional Japanese Christmas cake.
Pepsi Halloween Cola	2017	Released in October 2017, this "mystery" flavor was pink, with a sweet cherry and bubblegum flavor. It also somewhat resembled past Sakura-flavored Pepsi.
Pepsi Special Ume	2019	A limited edition ume-flavored Pepsi, released on October 1, 2019.
Pepsi Sparkling Xmas	2019	A limited edition Christmas-themed Pepsi released November 5, 2019. With a grape flavored.
Pepsi Orange	2020	An orange-flavored Pepsi variant, released in 2020.
Pepsi Caramel Punch	2020	A limited edition caramel-flavored Pepsi, released on October 20, 2020.
Pepsi Salty Litchi	2020	A salt and lychee flavored Pepsi, sold in August 2020 for a limited time only.
Pepsi Nama Cola	2021	Made by PepsiCo's Japanese business partner Suntory. It soon became a hit across greater China.
Pepsi Lychee Salt	2022	A lychee and salt flavored Pepsi, sold in 2022 for Aeon group limited only.
Pepsi Karaage Senyo Cola	2022	Pepsi variant made to be enjoyed along Karaage fried chicken, released on June 9, 2022.
Pepsi Fried Chicken Senyo Cola	2022	A lemon flavored Pepsi variant made to be enjoyed along Fried Chicken, released on December 2, 2022.
Pepsi Zangi Senyo Cola	2023	Pepsi variant made to be enjoyed along Zangi fried chicken, released on April 18, 2023 for Hokkaido limited only.
Pepsi Yakisoba Senyo Cola	2023	A mint flavored Pepsi variant made to be enjoyed along Yakisoba, released on June 7, 2023.
Pepsi Cola Cherry	2023	A cherry flavored Pepsi, released on July 4, 2023 for Aeon group limited only. The same concept was later on June 18, 2024 for PPIH group limited only as Pepsi Cherry.
Drink Bar at Home Pepsi Cola	2025	Pepsi with a syrup-type, released on February 10, 2025.

=== China ===
Name	Launched	Notes
Pepsi Sweet Osmanthus	2020	Pepsi with sweet osmanthus flower flavoring, launched in 2020.
Pepsi White Peach and Oolong	2021	Pepsi with white peach and Oolong tea flavoring, launched in 2021.
Pepsi Banpeiyu and Green Bamboo	2022	Pepsi with banpeiyu and bamboo flavoring, launched in 2022.

=== Latin America ===
Name	Launched	Notes
Pepsi Limón	2002	Pepsi with lemon flavor released in Mexico in 2002, later returned as Pepsi Twist in 2004. No longer produced.
Pepsi Twistão	2003	Sold during summertime in Brazil, it is a Pepsi variant with a lemon flavor stronger than regular Pepsi Twist. "Twistão", in Portuguese, is the augmentative of "Twist".
Pepsi Capuchino	2006	A blend of cola with mocha-latte coffee flavor. Released for a limited time in Guatemala and El Salvador in 2006 in 600 ml (20 US fl oz) bottles. Later introduced in Honduras in 2012.
Pepsi Retro	2008	Released in Mexico in February 2008. Pepsi made with natural ingredients, sugar cane, and cola nut extract.
Pecsi	2009	Pepsi spelled differently as "Pecsi". Produced in Argentina in 2009 and Mexico in 2011.
Pepsi Kaffe	2000s	One of a number of coffee-flavored Pepsi variants introduced outside the US throughout the 2000s

=== Other markets ===
- Pepsi Blue Chilled Cola, or simply Pepsi Blue, which was promoted by Britney Spears was released in Vietnam. Another version of Pepsi, Pepsi Ice Mint flavored Pepsi sold for a limited time along with Pepsi Fire in south east Asia including Malaysia.
- Pepsi Cheer, a sweet syrup tasting style of Pepsi sold in Thailand in 2010.
- Pepsi Fire: a limited edition, cinnamon-flavored variety that is sold in Guam, Saipan, Thailand, Mexico, Malaysia, Singapore, the Philippines, and Vietnam. It is also a Pepsi Ice twin version.
- Pepsi Green: a bright-green variety introduced in Thailand on January 15, 2009.
- Pepsi Creaming Soda : A strong cream and vanilla light pepsi tasting soda. Giving out an ice cream milkshake like flavor. Available in Australia & New Zealand.
- Pepsi Ice: Pepsi with an icy mint flavor. Sold in Guam, Thailand, Malaysia, Singapore, and the Philippines. In summer 2007 Pepsi used the name Pepsi Ice in the Czech Republic and Slovakia for a limited edition cola with apple flavor.
- Pepsi Light: sold in Australia and New Zealand for short time.
- Pepsi Aha: Lemon-flavored Pepsi sold in India
- Pepsi Pinas: Pepsi Blue renamed sold in Philippines
- Pepsi Pogi: Sold only in Philippines
- Pepsi Mango:Available both in Australia & New Zealand since 2021.
- Pepsi Latte: Sold in Thailand
- Pepsi Tarik: Coffee-flavored, sold in Malaysia and Singapore
- Pepsi Ume: Ume-flavored Pepsi sold in Thailand

== Low-calorie/zero-calorie varieties ==
=== Diet Pepsi/Pepsi Light ===
Name	Launched	Notes
Diet Pepsi	1963/1964	The original low-calorie version of Pepsi. It was first test marketed in 1963 under the name Patio Diet Cola, and was re-branded as Diet Pepsi when it officially launched in 1964. It is known as Pepsi Light in most international regions, and Pepsi Diet in the UK from the late-1990's until 2013.
Caffeine Free Diet Pepsi	1982	Pepsi without the Caffeine. It was first introduced in 1982 as Diet Pepsi Free but was changed to its current name in 1987. It is also available in some other regions including the United Kingdom.
Diet Pepsi Wild Cherry	1988	Cherry flavored Diet Pepsi, introduced in 1988. It was known under the slightly different name of Diet Wild Cherry Pepsi until 2005, and was originally found in scarce regions until the rebranding.
Diet Pepsi AM	1989	A variety of Diet Pepsi that contained 25% extra caffeine and was marketed as a morning drink. It was introduced in test markets in August 1989, but was discontinued in October 1990 due to poor sales and reception.
Diet Crystal Pepsi	1992	A low-calorie Clear cola that was sold for a short time between 1992 and 1993. Unlike its regular counterpart, this version has never been re-released.
Diet Pepsi Kona	1996	Diet Pepsi with Coffee flavoring. It was test-marketed in Philadelphia during May 1996 until 1997, which due to low sales, never led to a full release.
Diet Pepsi Lemon	2000	Lemon-flavored Diet Pepsi. It was first released as Diet Pepsi Twist in 2000, and was discontinued alongside its regular counterpart in 2006. It was re-released as Diet Pepsi NFL Kickoff during the NFL kickoffs of 2008, and again under its current name as a permanent variety in 2009. It is however, no longer available.
Diet Pepsi Vanilla	2003	Diet Pepsi with Vanilla flavoring. It was released in the US and Canada in 2003 as Pepsi's answer to Vanilla Coke. It remained on shelves even after the regular version was discontinued.
Diet Pepsi Lime	2004	Pepsi with Lime flavoring. It was introduced in 2004 Diet Coke with Lime and remained on shelves after the regular variety was discontinued. It is also sold in Spain as Pepsi Light Lima.
Diet Pepsi Jazz	2006/2007	A series of flavored colas available exclusively in diet form. The range launched with Black Cherry French Vanilla and Strawberries and Cream flavors in July 2006, followed on with a Caramel Cream flavor in February 2007. They were all discontinued by 2009.
Pepsi Light Mojito	2006/2007	A Non-alcoholic mojito-flavored Pepsi Light. it was Germany in 2008 and later sold in Italy in 2009 as a Limited Edition.
Diet Pepsi Cherry Vanilla	2010	Diet Pepsi with Cherry Vanilla flavoring. It was released for the Summer 2010 for eight weeks.
Diet Pepsi (Splenda formula)	2015	Diet Pepsi sweetened with Sucralose instead of Aspartame. It was first released in 2015 as a reformulation of regular Diet Pepsi, which replaced the original aspartame-sweetened formula until 2018. While no longer available for retail, it can still be purchased via E-commerce.

=== Pepsi Max ===
Name	Launched	Notes
Pepsi Max	1993	The original variation of the drink. It was first introduced in 1993 in Europe and Australia, and since expanded across the world. It has no direct connection to the American/Canadian Pepsi Max which is now known as Pepsi Zero Sugar.
Pepsi Max Lemon	2004	A lemon-flavored variety. It was first sold in Belgium as Pepsi Max Cool Lemon (before renaming in 2017) and has also been sold in Norway, Sweden, The Netherlands, and Germany.
Pepsi Max Lemon & Lime Twist	2005	A Lemon/Lime flavored variety. It was introduced to the United Kingdom in early 2005, and was discontinued by 2007. it was also sold in France as Pepsi Max Citron Citron Vert.
Pepsi Max Punch	2005	A ginger and cinnamon flavored version that was sold in the United Kingdom for the 2005 Christmas Season. It is similar to Pepsi Holiday Spice.
Pepsi Max Gold	2006	A ginger-hinted variant that was sold alongside the regular Pepsi Gold in Finland for the 2006 FIFA World Cup.
Pepsi Max Coffee Cino	2006	A coffee-flavored variety sold in a number of countries. It was released in the United Kingdom in 2006, but was withdrawn a year later. It was also released in France and Portugal as Pepsi Max Cappuccino.
Pepsi Max Chill	2007	An Apple-flavored variety that was sold as a limited edition in Sweden and Finland in the Summer of 2007.
Pepsi Max Mojo	2008	A Mojito Lime/mint-flavored variety that was sold in Finland in 2008. It was also available in Denmark in 2009 as Pepsi Max Mojito.
Pepsi Max Energy	2008	A variant with 66% more caffeine than the standard variety. It was sold in Germany in 2008.
Pepsi Max Wild Side	2010	A Wild baobab flavored variety that was sold in Sweden in 2010.
Pepsi Max Lime	2011	A Lime-favored variety. It was first sold as Pepsi Max Cease Fire and Pepsi Max Citrus Freeze in Australia/New Zealand and the United Kingdom respectively in 2011 as part of a promotion with Doritos corn chips. It was re-released in Australia under its current name for a limited time in 2016, and re-released in the United Kingdom in 2021. It has since been introduced in Lebanon, Finland, Sweden, Norway, Iceland, Hungary, Romania, Poland, Serbia, Czech Republic, Bulgaria, Greece, China, Vietnam, Thailand, Laos, Philippines, Kuwait, South Korea.
Pepsi Max Cherry	2011	A Cherry-flavored variety. It was first released in the United Kingdom in June 2011 only at Asda stores in 2 liter bottles, and gained a wide release in 2012. It has also been released in France (2014), Denmark, Norway, Germany (2015), Finland, Iceland (2016) and Russia (2018).
Pepsi Max Ginger	2017	A Ginger-flavored variety. It has been released in the United Kingdom, Lebanon, Russia, Norway, Finland, The Netherlands, Denmark, Sweden and Germany.
Pepsi Max Vanilla	2018	A Vanilla-flavored variety. It was first sold in Australia in February 2018 and was later released in New Zealand in April. It was later released in Poland and Germany.
Pepsi Max Raspberry	2018	A Raspberry-flavored variety. It was first sold in Australia in 2018, and was later released in United Kingdom since March 2019 and in Turkey since 2020. It was also sold in Nordic countries like Sweden, France (as Pepsi Black Raspberry), Russia, China, Taiwan, Thailand, Kuwait and the United Arab Emirates.
Pepsi Max Creaming Soda	2019	A Cream Soda-flavored variety. It was sold in Australia in August 2019. It was launched in the United Kingdom in 2024 as Pepsi Zero Sugar Cream Soda Flavour.
Pepsi Max Mango	2020	A Mango-flavored variety that was first sold in Australia in August 2020 and later made available in Hungary, Poland, Czech Republic, Serbia, Sweden, Turkey, Denmark, Bulgaria and most recently the United Kingdom.
Pepsi Max No Caffeine	2020	A Caffeine-free variety that was introduced in the United Kingdom in 2021.
Pepsi Max Strawberry	2021	A Strawberry-flavored variety that was first sold in Thailand in May 2021 and later made available in Laos, Egypt.
Pepsi Max Electric	2024	A blue-colored variant that was first sold in Norway in April 2024 by Ringnes. It will be sold in the United Kingdom for a year-long period in May as simply Pepsi Electric, released through Britvic. Introduced in Canada 19 may 2025, labelled Pepsi Electric Zesty Citrus.

=== Other Low-Calorie Varieties ===
Name	Launched	Notes
Pepsi Light	1975	An alternative variant of Diet Pepsi sold in the United States. It featured a Lemon flavor that was used to overcome the powerful aftertaste of Saccharin. The Lemon flavoring was removed in 1984 when the sweetener was changed to Aspartame, and was discontinued by 1988. It has no connection to the alternative name Diet Pepsi uses in most countries.
Pepsi Max (Canada)	1994	The Canadian version of Pepsi Max used a different formula than the one used internationally (but sharing the same packaging design), being a mid-calorie cola sweetened with a blend of Corn Syrup and Aspartame. It was discontinued by 2002.
Pepsi XL	1995	A mid-calorie cola targeted at males, and transition consumers making the move from regular to diet colas, similar to the version of Pepsi Max sold in Canada. It was sweetened with a 50/50 blend of Corn Syrup and Aspartame. It was test-marketed in Florida in 1995, but possible low sales never led to a full release in the United States.
Pepsi One	1998	A one-calorie cola that was originally sweetened with a blend of Aspartame and Acesulfame Potassium, with one calorie per serving. It was made to be similar to the international Pepsi Max but used its own formula. Aspartame was exchanged for Splenda-branded Sucralose in 2005 with a major rebranding. It continued to use the 2003 Pepsi design until mid-2012, and then swapped to the new logo. It was discontinued in 2015, following low sales and the swapping of Diet Pepsi's main sweetener from Aspartame to Sucralose.
Pepsi Edge	2004	A mid-calorie cola sold in the United States and Canada that contained half the carbohydrates, calories and sugars of a normal Pepsi, and was sweetened with Splenda brand Sucrolose. It was PepsiCo's answer to the similarity-short-lived Coca-Cola C2. It was known as Pepsi Avantage in Canadian French. The drink suffered from poor sales, and was discontinued in 2005. It was featured on an episode of The Apprentice 2 in which teams had to design a prototype bottle.
Pepsi NEX	2006	A zero-calorie Pepsi available in Japan and South Korea, developed by Suntory (Also advertised through the anime Tiger & Bunny and U-Know and Max of TVXQ)
Pepsi Zero Sugar	2007	A zero-calorie cola. It was originally known as Diet Pepsi Max (2007-2008) and Pepsi Max (2008-2016), although it's not related to the drink sold outside the US and Canada. Until a formula change in Late-2022, the drink had more caffeine than standard Pepsi, alongside ginseng extract.
Pepsi Twist 3	2008	A low-calorie version of Pepsi that was sold in Mexico. It contains three calories of the natural Lemon Juice.
Pepsi Kick	2009	A version of Diet Pepsi with extra Caffeine and Ginseng. It was introduced in Mexico in 2009.
Pepsi Twist Zero	2010	A zero-calorie Lime-flavored cola that was available in Brazil.
Pepsi Max Cease Fire	2010	A Lime-flavored variant of Pepsi Max sold in the United States that was released as part of a promotional tie-in with special "Burn" Doritos corn chips.
Pepsi Next	2012	A mid-calorie version of Pepsi released in March 2012, described by the company as having "60% lower sugar content and fewer calories." It was discontinued by 2015.
Pepsi Next Cherry Vanilla	2012	A mid-calorie Cherry Vanilla flavored Pepsi that was sold for a limited time in the summer of 2012.
Pepsi Next Paradise Mango	2012	A mid-calorie Mango flavored Pepsi that was sold for a limited time in the summer of 2012.
Pepsi Next (Stevia version)	2013	The version of Pepsi Next in some regions outside the United States are sweetened with Stevia as the sweetener. It was sold in Canada, France and The Netherlands. The packaging was later changed to that of Pepsi True.
Pepsi Strong Zero	2015	A variation of Diet Pepsi with extra carbonation and caffeine. It was sold in Japan by Suntory in 2015 alongside its regular counterpart.
Pepsi Black	2017	A low-calorie cola similar to but not to be confused with Pepsi Max. It was introduced in 2017 in Brazil, Croatia, the Czech Republic, Greece, Hungary, Slovakia, Slovenia, and Ukraine. In the latter countries, it replaced Pepsi Light.
Pepsi Zero Sugar Mango	2021	A Mango-flavored variant of Pepsi Zero Sugar sold in the United States. It was introduced to coincide with the permanent release of the standard Pepsi Mango.
Pepsi Zero Sugar Wild Cherry	2021	A Cherry-flavored variant of Pepsi Zero Sugar sold in the United States.
Pepsi Zero Sugar Vanilla	2021	A Vanilla-flavored variant of Pepsi Zero Sugar sold in the United States.
Pepsi Zero Sugar Soda Shop Cream Soda	2022	A Cream Soda-flavored variant of Pepsi Zero Sugar sold as part of the Pepsi Soda Shop range. It was sold as a limited edition in November 2022, joining the standard variety.
Pepsi Zero Lemon	2023	A Lemon-flavored variety that was introduced in March 2023 for Chushikoku, Japan limited only. The same concept was later in February 2024 as Pepsi Big Zero Lemon.
Pepsi Zero Sugar Strawberries & Cream	2024	A Strawberry/Cream soda variety introduced in the United Kingdom in January 2025 and was introduced in Thailand in January 2026.
Pepsi Zero Sugar Orange	2024	An Orange-flavored variety that was introduced in Thailand in March 2024.
Pepsi Zero Sugar Peach	2024	A Peach-flavored variety that was introduced for limited time in Canada.
Pepsi Big Zero Lemon	2024	A Lemon-flavored variety that was introduced in Japan in February 2024.
Pepsi Zero Sugar Lime Zero Caffeine	2024	A Lime-flavored with Caffeine-free variety that was introduced in South Korea in March 2024.
Pepsi Big Zero Pineapple	2024	A Pineapple-flavored variety that was introduced in Japan in June 2024 for summer limited only.
Pepsi Zero Peach	2025	A Peach-flavored with collaboration of Heralbony released on February 21, 2025 for Kansai, Japan limited only.
Pepsi Zero Sugar Ume	2025	A Ume-flavored variety that was introduced in Thailand in March 2025.
Pepsi Zero Sugar Dubai Chocolate	2026	A Dubai Chocolate-flavored variety introduced in Thailand in May 2026.

== Fictional drinks ==
- Pepsi Perfect: A vitamin-enriched Pepsi variation shown in the movie Back to the Future Part II in scenes set in the year 2015.
