= Pepsi One =

Brand of cola produced by Pepsi

- Type: Diet Cola
- Manufacturer: PepsiCo
- Origin: United States
- Introduced: October 1998
- Discontinued: 2015
- Related products: Pepsi True, Pepsi Next, Pepsi Max, Pepsi X, Diet Pepsi, Diet Coke, Coca-Cola Zero

Pepsi One was a sugar-free cola, marketed by PepsiCo in the United States from 1998 to 2015 as an alternative to regular Pepsi and Diet Pepsi. It was also corporately styled PEPSI ONE, so named because it contains one calorie per eight-fluid ounce [230 ml] serving.

== History ==
On June 30, 1998, the artificial sweetener acesulfame potassium (Ace-K) was approved for use by the Food and Drug Administration. PepsiCo responded within one hour, announcing the introduction of Pepsi One, which reached store shelves the following October. The original formulation was sweetened with aspartame and acesulfame potassium. This new variety was based upon an earlier product (sold in other countries) called Pepsi Max, but it featured a formula and flavor profile developed specifically for the U.S. market. Before the launch of Pepsi One in 1998, PepsiCo also marketed Diet Pepsi as having one calorie per serving from that product's launch in 1964 until 1991.

The launch of Pepsi One included an advertising campaign featuring the slogan "just one calorie." Subsequently, comedian Tom Green appeared as the spokesperson in a series of television advertisements that began airing in April 1999.

On March 21, 2005, Pepsi-Cola North America announced that it would begin adding sucralose to a newly reformulated Pepsi ONE in order to create a full-flavor cola taste.

In 2015, after its sister product Diet Pepsi had changed to using sucralose and Ace-K as sweeteners instead of aspartame, Pepsi One was discontinued.

== Ingredients ==
The caffeine content was 57.1 mg per 12 US fl oz (355 mL) serving (161 mg/L).

In January 2014, Consumer Reports magazine tested levels of the chemical 4-methylimidazole (4-MeI) – a potential carcinogen – in various beverages in the United States and found that Pepsi ONE was one of two drinks that contained the chemical in excess of 29 micrograms per can or bottle, with that being California Proposition 65's daily allowed amount for foods without a warning label.

== Sponsorship ==
On April 7, 2010, Toyota Speedway at Irwindale announced that Pepsi One would be the title sponsor of the track's top division super late models. The series was called the NASCAR Pepsi One Super Late Models.

== See also ==
- List of Pepsi variations
