= Pepsi Next =

Discontinued soft drink

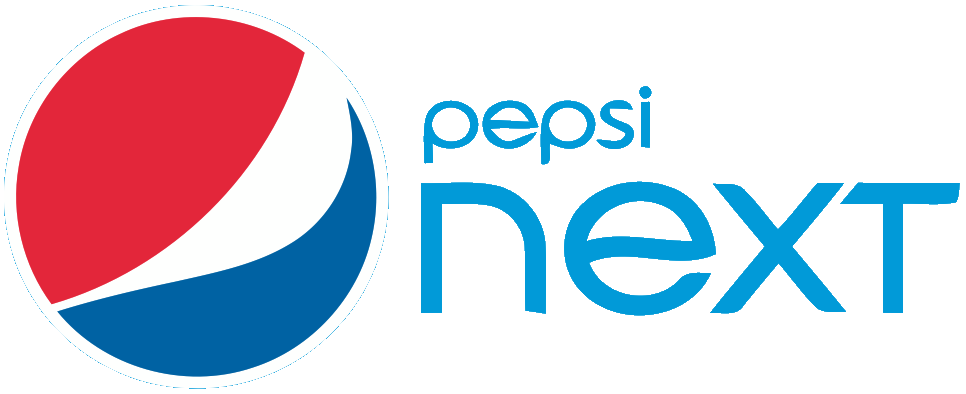
- Product type: Mid-calorie cola, and 30% less sugar
- Current owner: PepsiCo
- Country: United States
- Introduced: 2012
- Discontinued: 2015; 11 years ago
- Related brands: Pepsi Edge; Pepsi ONE; Pepsi Max; G2; Tab

Pepsi Next (stylized as pepsi next or pepsi NEXT) was a cola-flavored carbonated soft drink produced by PepsiCo from 2012 until 2015. It was a variant of the Pepsi cola range and was marketed in a number of territories worldwide with varying different flavors.

== Development ==
Pepsi Edge, Pepsi's first mid-calorie cola, was introduced in 2004 and discontinued only two years later. PepsiCo, towards the end of the 2000s, found a new interest in mid-calorie beverages and then released G2 in 2007, a version of Gatorade with less than half the calories, and then Trop50, a juice blend, with 50% the calories of regular juice. In September 2007, PepsiCo filed for trademarks in the US Patent and Trademark Office, for "Pepsi Next", and "Diet Pepsi Next".

In June 2011, PepsiCo announced that Pepsi Next was going to be moved into two test markets, Cedar Rapids, Iowa, and Eau Claire, Wisconsin. After testing, on February 27, 2012, PepsiCo announced the launch of Pepsi Next.

Pepsi Next was first introduced in France in March 2013, then in Finland and Canada in March 2014. Stevia extract is used in all three markets.

== Formulations ==
In some markets it was sweetened with high fructose corn syrup, sugar, acesulfame potassium, and sucralose, and marketed toward drinkers of full-calorie Pepsi, and those who do not enjoy the taste of Diet Pepsi, Pepsi ONE, Pepsi Max, and other diet cola beverages.

On June 25, 2013, PepsiCo informed their Facebook readers that the new formulation of Pepsi Next no longer contained aspartame, the artificial sweetener used in many diet soft drinks including Diet Pepsi, hence some bottles sold in the U.S. read 'aspartame free'. However, the continued presence of acesulfame potassium meant Pepsi Next still contained artificial sweeteners.

In other marketing areas, including Canada, Finland, the Netherlands, Australia and New Zealand, where it was marketed as having "30% less sugar", Pepsi Next was sweetened using an extract from stevia and had no artificial sweeteners.

In the Australian market, Pepsi Next was bottled by Schweppes Australia and is sweetened by stevia which reduces the sugar content by 30% compared to regular Pepsi.

== Reception ==
A review from TheImpulsiveBuy.com stated that, "Although it contains three artificial sweeteners and has 60 percent fewer calories than regular Pepsi, it's really hard to taste anything "diet" about Pepsi Next. But it's not quite like regular Pepsi; it's less syrupy and smoother. There are also differences in flavor between Pepsi Next and the original Pepsi. I thought Pepsi Next had a slightly stronger cola flavor and, for some reason, my taste buds perceived a hint of lemon."

According to the BevReview, the initial taste of Pepsi Next is similar to the original Pepsi, but this is followed by the less pleasant taste of artificial sweeteners.

== Marketing ==
When Pepsi Next launched in 2012, a series of Internet and print ads were made, with a picture of a can of Pepsi Next, with the words: Real Cola Taste, 60% Less Sugar, Drink It To Believe It.

Eva Longoria, Paula Patton, and Nicki Minaj all have featured in advertisements for Pepsi Next. Paula Patton filmed a television commercial for Pepsi Next, as has Nicki Minaj.

In the 2013 Super Bowl, Pepsi used its advertising minutes right before the halftime show (which featured Beyonce, a "brand ambassador" for Pepsi) to advertise Pepsi Next. The presentation by Pepsi (the halftime show plus the advertising) was unique in that it featured photos of Pepsi customers. Pepsi had asked customers to send in photos before the Super Bowl.

== See also ==
- Pepsi Edge – The mid-calorie cola that preceded Pepsi Next, was considered a failure and was discontinued after two years
- Diet Pepsi - The original Diet Cola version of Pepsi
- Pepsi Zero Sugar – A diet cola also called Pepsi Max in some markets
- Pepsi ONE - A discontinued diet cola sweetened with Splenda
