= Pepsi Globe =

Logo

The current Pepsi logo used as of August 23, 2023, revealed earlier that year.

The Pepsi Globe is the logo for Pepsi, named for the red, white, and blue design in a sphere-like shape. It is one of the most recognizable logos in the world.

== History ==
The Globe has its origins in the 1940s, when Pepsi unveiled a new bottle cap that featured the script Pepsi-Cola wordmark in the white field of a waving tricolor, meant as a show of U.S. patriotism during World War II. An illustration of that bottle cap would become a common device in Pepsi's advertising beginning in 1945, and remained a motif beyond both an update to the script in 1951 and when the script was replaced with a modern sans-serif wordmark in 1962.

The literal depiction of the bottle cap was retired in favor of a simplified representation in 1970, an adaptation of a carton-only design adopted the year prior, at which point the wordmark was made smaller to nest within the perimeter of the disc. Diet Pepsi was given a unique striped version of the Globe in February 1986, accompanied by the drink name set in Handel Gothic. The mainline Pepsi logo would undergo a minor update at the beginning of 1987 by adopting a similar type style.

A 1991 redesign moved the wordmark from within the Globe to above it, dramatically reducing the size and prominence of the Globe. In 1997, the red bar was removed as Pepsi adopted all-blue packaging, and visually detailed the Pepsi Globe to appear three-dimensional. This was the first logo officially named the "Pepsi Globe". The design was refined in August 2003 when the typeface was updated and the Pepsi Globe became more detailed. This version remained mostly the same in 2008 when Pepsi redesigned the packaging once more to show different backgrounds on each can, though the color remained blue.

Versions of the Pepsi Globe
The Pepsi logo used from 1962 to October 1970; first to omit the word 'cola'

The logo used from October 1970 to December 1986; revived for Pepsi Throwback in 2009

The logo used from January 1987 to 1991, with the wordmark set in Handel Gothic.

The logo used from September 1991 to December 1997, with the wordmark separated from the globe.

The logo used from December 1997 to July 2003, which employed shading to render the globe as a ball

The logo used from August 2003 to May 2008, which used highlighting that suggested an irregular three-dimensional form

The logo used from May 2008 to mid-2009, which augmented the existing design with water droplets and ice fragments. However, the old logo was still in use in US stores, even though the 2008 logo had been released. A combination of the 2003 and 2008 logos was stocked in US stores until the beginning of the third week of June 2008.

The logo used from June 2009 to June 2014, which restored flat coloration and introduced a new form suggestive of a 'P' or a smile.

Previous logo from June 2014 to August 2023.

Current logo, in use since August 2023

=== 2008 redesign by Arnell Group ===
In October 2008, Pepsi announced it had contracted New York–based brand consultancy agency Arnell Group to redesign many of its products for 2009. Initial unveiling of the newly designed globe came in the form of a leaked 27-page design proposal entitled BREATHTAKING Design Strategy, which used such over-the-top language that some suggested that it was part of a viral marketing scheme. The globe underwent its most dramatic transformation to date, with the white band losing its rotationally symmetric wave in favor of an irregular form suggestive of a smile or the letter P. The wordmarks was made all-lowercase and changed to a geometric sans-serif type, a design highly similar to that used for Diet Pepsi in the 1970s and 1980s.

Initially the width of the "smile" was varied across products, with the narrowest assigned to Diet Pepsi and the widest assigned to Pepsi Max, but by 2010 all variants except Pepsi Throwback were using the standard version of the Globe.

=== 2023 redesign ===
On 28 March 2023, PepsiCo unveiled a new Pepsi Globe, which launched in the US on 23 August of that year. The new design is strongly referential to the 1973 Globe and restores the centred wordmark. The wordmark, as well as other accompanying brand elements, is black rather than blue for the first time since the bottlecap image was replaced by the abstract Globe. The logo started the phase-in process on Pepsi products starting on 23 August 2023.
