= Pepsi AM =

Discontinued Pepsi drink

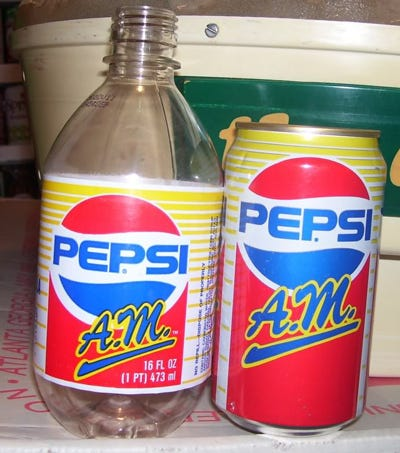
Pepsi AM can and bottle

Pepsi AM is a variant of Pepsi that contained 25% extra caffeine and was marketed as a morning boost/energy drink.

== History ==
In August 1989, PepsiCo first began to test market Pepsi A.M. alongside its Diet variant in sporadic regions of the United States aimed at coffee drinkers.

It was then later reported that Pepsi A.M. was getting test-marketed in some regions of massive cities. These cities confirmed are Cedar Falls, Iowa, Waterloo, Iowa, and Fort Wayne, Indiana. Others unconfirmed are Pittsburgh, New York and Phoenix. The unconfirmed locations are unknown from this test market release.

Shortly after its introduction, a year of production, Pepsi A.M. and its Diet variation ceased production in October 1990 due to low sales and Reception.
