= Nitro Pepsi =

PepsiCo soft drink

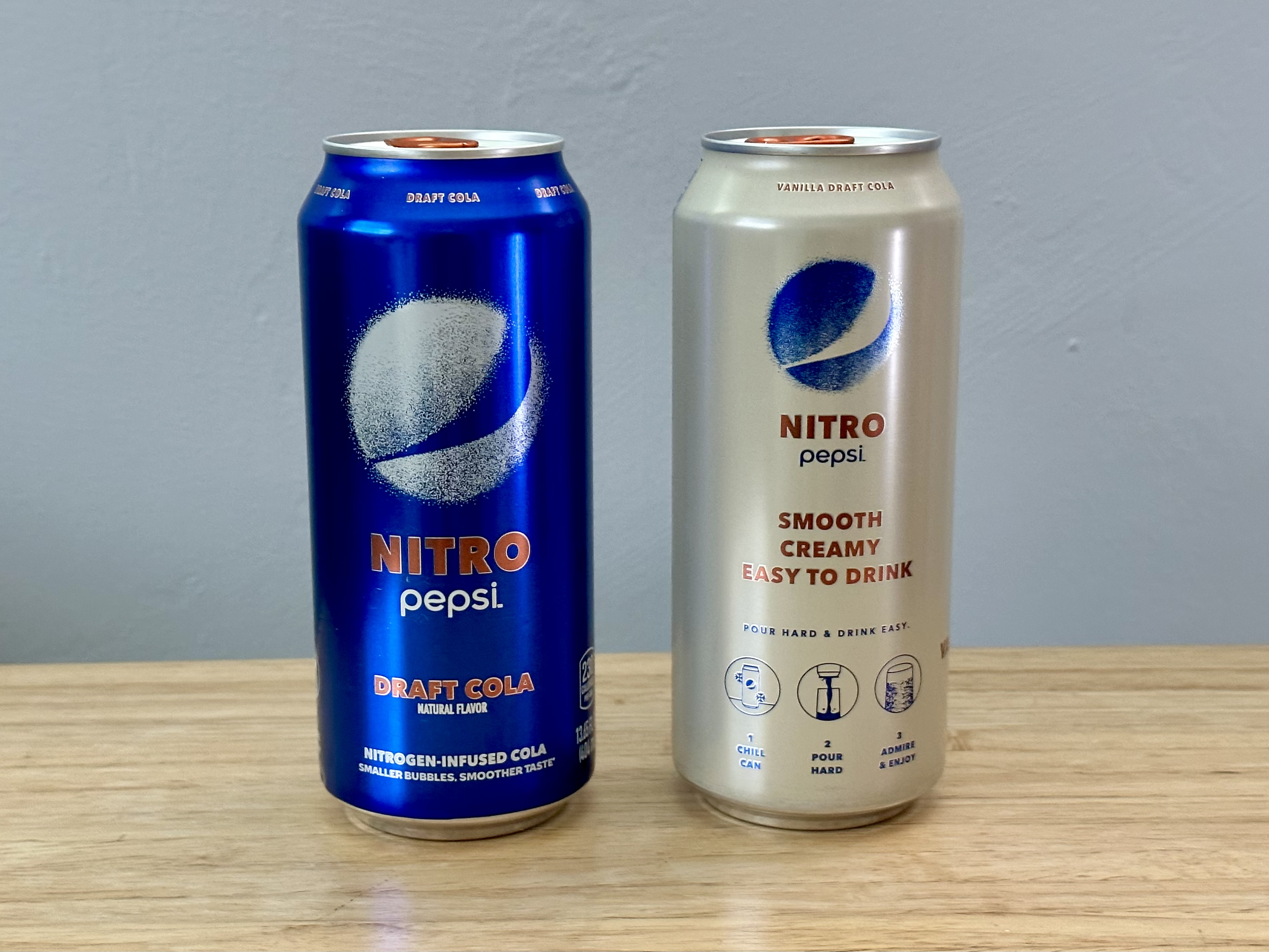
- Cans of Nitro Pepsi (left) and in vanilla flavor (right)
- Type: Soft drink
- Manufacturer: PepsiCo
- Introduced: March 2022
- Discontinued: January 2025; 1 year ago

Nitro Pepsi was a cola soft drink produced by PepsiCo. It was a nitrogen-infused version of Pepsi. The addition of nitrogen gas, instead of the usual carbon dioxide, created a smooth texture.

It was developed around 2019, and had been marketed since March 2022. The drink came in an aluminum can containing a widget that infused the drink with nitrogen when the can was opened, similar to a system developed in the late 1950s by Michael Edward Ash for nitrogenating canned draft beers such as Guinness. The beverage was also available in a vanilla flavor.

On October 18, 2024, PepsiCo announced that they would be discontinuing Nitro Pepsi in January 2025.

== Reception ==
Ross Yoder, writing for BuzzFeed, stated that "Nitro Pepsi essentially tastes like flat (but ice-cold!) Pepsi. More than that, I found it to be altogether too sweet." Josh Jackson, writing for Paste magazine, also noted the sweetness and said it was "super creamy and buttery".

== See also ==
- Nitro cold brew
