= Caffeine-Free Pepsi =

Soft drink

Caffeine Free Pepsi
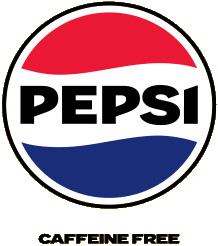

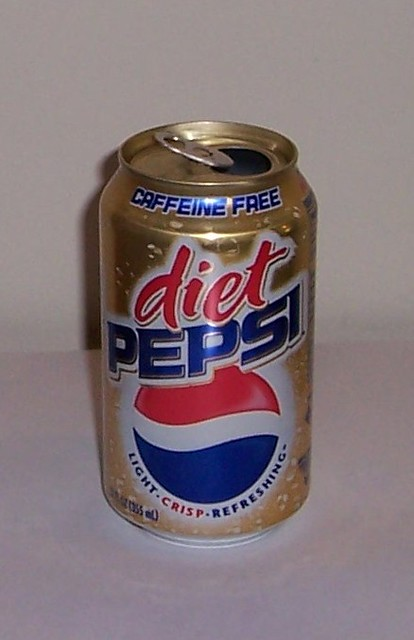
- Can of Caffeine-Free diet Pepsi with the 2005 design
- Type: Cola
- Manufacturer: Pepsi
- Origin: United States
- Introduced: 1982; 44 years ago
- Related products: Caffeine-Free Coca-Cola
- Website: pepsi.com/caffeine-free

Caffeine-Free Pepsi is a version of Pepsi that omits the caffeine that is customarily part of a cola. The drink has been marketed by PepsiCo since 1982. A sugar-free variant, Caffeine-Free Diet Pepsi, also exists. Caffeine-Free Pepsi is marketed and distincted with a gold colored brand and packaging.

== History ==
The product was introduced under the brand name Pepsi Free in 1982. It was claimed by PepsiCo to be 99.7 percent caffeine free. Diet Pepsi Free, a version based on Diet Pepsi, was also launched. The "Pepsi Free" name was phased out by 1987 and both were rebranded to their present names. As of 1994, it ranked as the tenth most sold soft drink in the United States.

== In popular culture ==
Pepsi Free (as it was then known) was the subject of a scene in the 1985 blockbuster film Back to the Future. Upon entering a café in 1955, Marty McFly (Michael J. Fox) asks for a Tab (Coca-Cola's first version of a sugar-free soft drink, which was not available until 1963) and is told that he cannot have a "tab," unless he orders something. He then asks for a Pepsi Free and is told, "If you want a Pepsi, pal, you're gonna pay for it!" ("Free" is here being mistaken for gratis.).
