= Pepsi-Cola Soda Shop Made with Real Sugar =

Soft drink brand

Pepsi-Cola Soda Shop, Made with Real Sugar

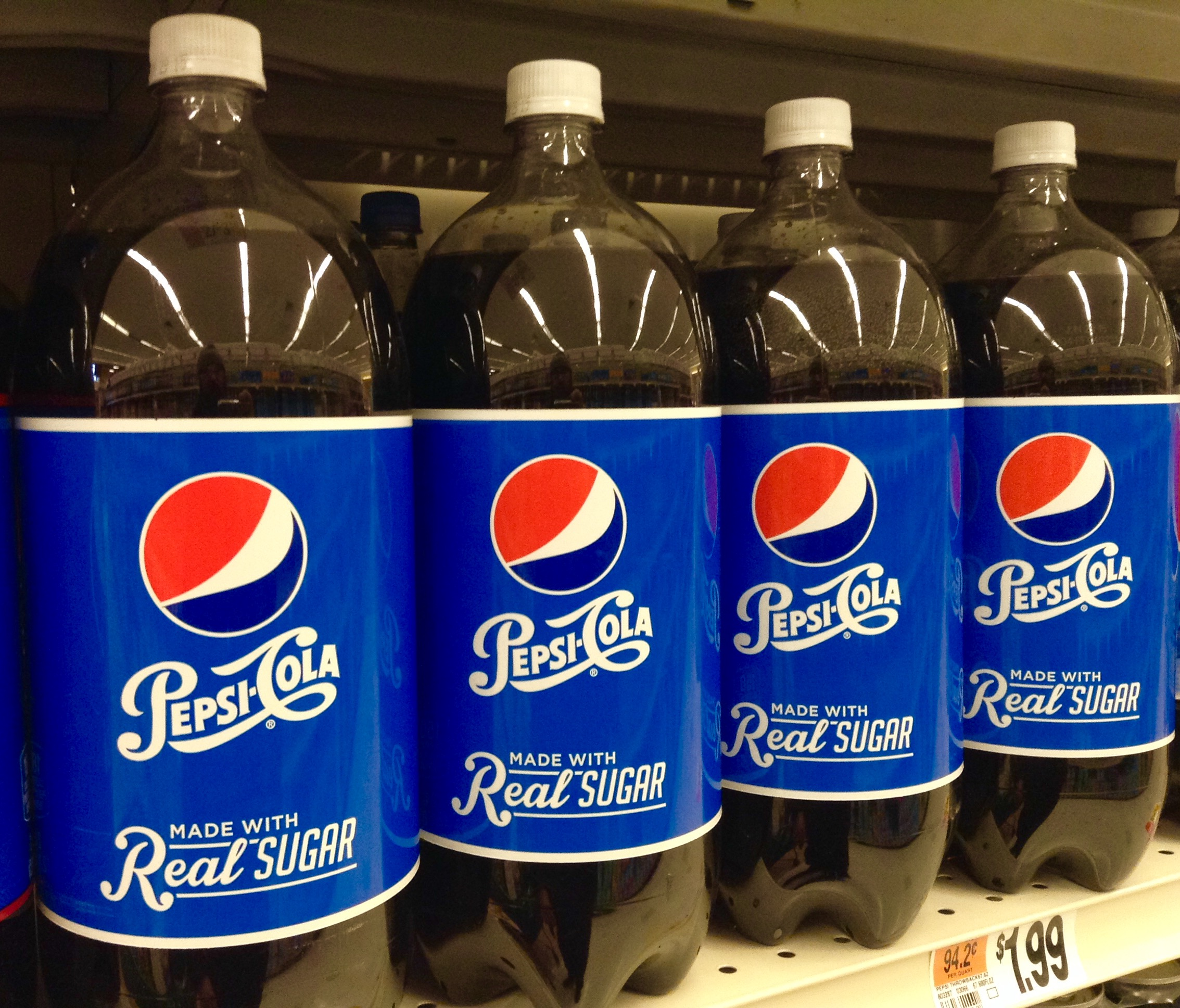
- Two-liter plastic bottles from 2015 with the 1940s "Pepsi-Cola" logo
- Product type: Cola drink
- Current owner: PepsiCo
- Country: United States
- Introduced: May 2009; 17 years ago
- Markets: United States, Canada
- Website: pepsi.com/products/pepsi-cola-made-real-sugar

Pepsi-Cola Soda Shop Made with Real Sugar, previously named Pepsi Throwback and Pepsi Made with Real Sugar, is a soft drink sold by PepsiCo. The drink is flavored with cane sugar and beet sugar instead of the sugar substitute high-fructose corn syrup that has been used in the standard version of Pepsi within North America since the 1980s.

Pepsi Throwback launched as a limited product in 2009 and became a permanent product in 2011. The name was changed to Pepsi-Cola Made with Real Sugar in June 2014, along with a slight change in formulation, and received a redesigned logo in April 2020. The "throwback" name had also used for a variant of PepsiCo's citrus-flavored Mountain Dew. In early 2024, it was announced that "Soda Shop" would be added to the brand's name with new packaging to fit in with the company's Soda Shop series of cane sugar sweetened sodas.

== Background ==
The cost of sugar in the United States started to rise in the late 1970s and into the 1980s as a result of government-imposed tariffs, prompting soft drink manufacturers to switch to high-fructose corn syrup (HFCS) as a cheaper alternative to sugar. By the mid-1980s, all of the major soft drink brands had switched to HFCS for their North American products, with the original formula of Coca-Cola being one of the last holdouts. In most countries, sugar is still used rather than HFCS.

By the late 2000s, many soft drink fans wanted a return of sugar in the drinks, citing a slightly sweeter taste, controversies over negative health effects of HFCS, increases in the cost of corn syrup due to increased use of the product for ethanol production, as well as the cost of sugar having since dropped at that time.

== Distribution ==
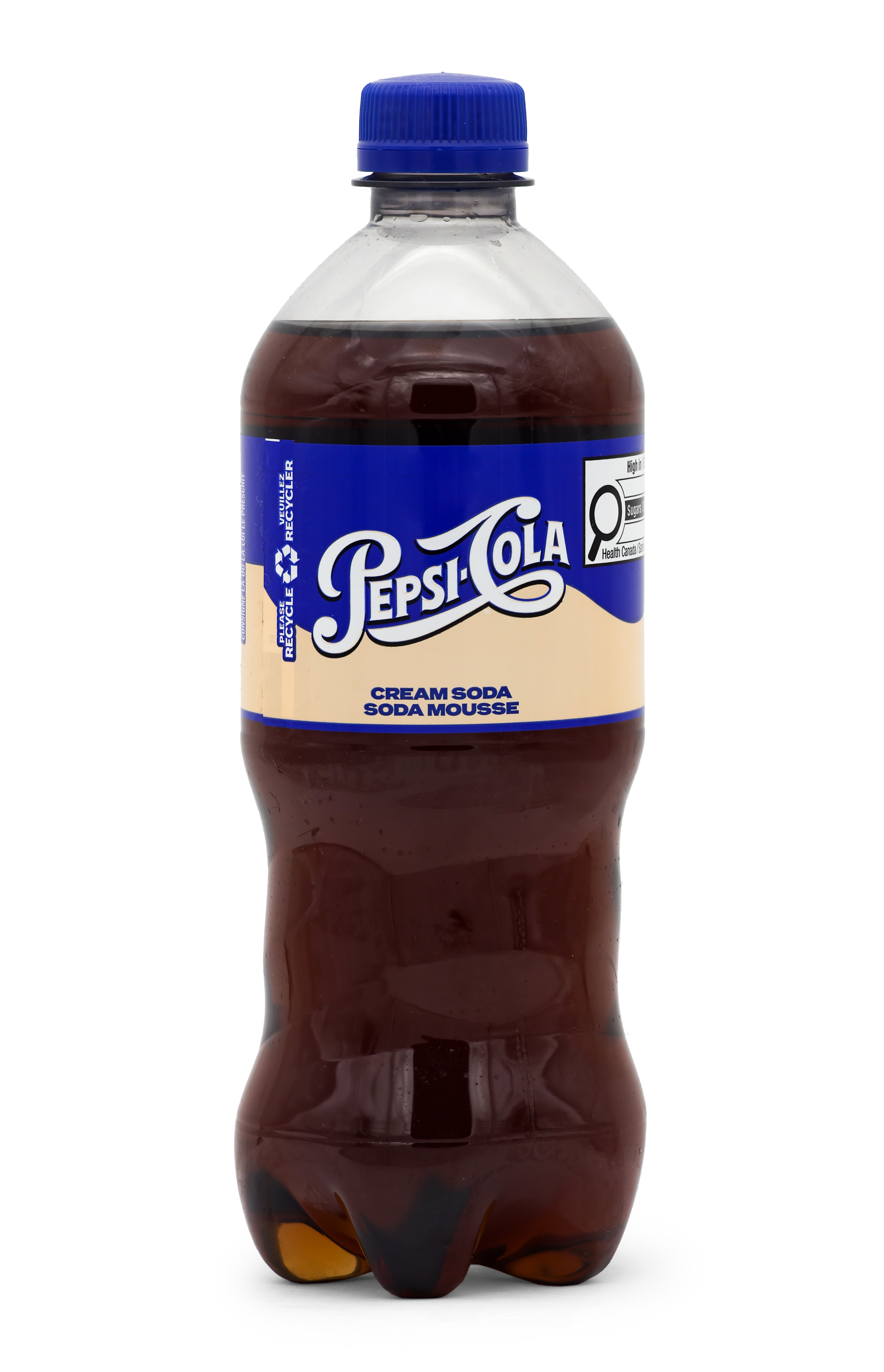
Pepsi-Cola Soda Shop, cream soda flavor

In early 2009, PepsiCo announced plans to release versions of Pepsi (and Mountain Dew) with pure cane sugar as its main sweetener, and without the citric acid found in regular Pepsi, on a limited basis. The original shipment went on sale in April 2009, and ended in June. Sales were strong for both, prompting PepsiCo to release a second limited edition for December 2009 – February 2010.

A third batch was released on July 31, 2010, again as a five-week limited availability. On October 12, Consumerist.com reported that Pepsi had decided to continue offering the Throwback line as long as consumers continued to buy it. A fourth batch appeared in stores in late December 2010, without a limited edition logo on the packaging. In January 2011, Pepsi Throwback began appearing in 12-packs of 355-ml cans, 591-ml bottles, and 32-pack 355-ml cans across Canada and sold until March 2011.

On March 11, 2011, PepsiCo announced that both Pepsi Throwback and Mountain Dew Throwback would become permanent additions to the Pepsi and Mountain Dew product lines, at least in the United States. Pepsi Throwback returned to Canada in October 2012. Pepsi Throwback is still sold seasonally in Canada, with its most recent release being in late March 2023.

In 2014, Pepsi Throwback was replaced in most regions by "Pepsi-Cola Made with Real Sugar." This product has 10 mg less sodium than the previous Pepsi Throwback, and 1 g less sugar per 20 fl oz (591 mL), reducing the labeled calorie count on a bottle of that size from 260 to 250.

In early 2024, Pepsi-Cola Made with Real Sugar was rebranded as Pepsi-Cola Soda Shop Made with Real Sugar to fit in with the Soda Shop line of sugar-sweetened colas which also included limited time cream soda and black cherry variants.

== Packaging ==
The first release featured the 1940s Pepsi-Cola script in royal blue on a navy blue background with the word "throwback" written in the modern font. With the second release in December 2009, Pepsi used an exact replica of the 1973–1987 logo.

The change in branding away from the "Throwback" name has led to new packaging. The Pepsi-Cola Made with Real Sugar label is a variant of the Pepsi label that includes the 1940s-era "Pepsi-Cola" script logo accompanied by a banner reading "Made with Real Sugar."

With the rebranding to Pepsi-Cola Soda Shop Made with Real Sugar in early 2024, the font color of the text "Pepsi-Cola", "Soda Shop", and "Made with Real Sugar" was changed to black, in a similar way as the rebranded regular Pepsi logo as of 2023, with both the can design and bottle labels now having a white background with what appears to be a close-up of the red and blue sections of the Pepsi globe at the top and bottom edges.

== Nutritional comparison ==
Nutritional details
	Pepsi	Pepsi Throwback	Pepsi-Cola Made with Real Sugar
Serving	12 fl oz (355 mL)	12 fl oz (355 mL)	12 fl oz (355 mL)
Calories	150	150	150
Sodium	30 mg	20 mg	30 mg
Potassium	10 mg	0 mg	10 mg
Phosphorus	53 mg	60 mg	60 mg
Total Carb.	41 g	40 g	40 g
Sugars	41 g	40 g	40 g
Caffeine	38 mg	38 mg	38 mg
Ingredients	Carbonated Water, High Fructose Corn Syrup, Caramel Color, Sugar, Phosphoric Acid, Caffeine, Citric Acid, Natural Flavor	Carbonated Water, Sugar, Caramel Color, Phosphoric Acid, Caffeine, Natural Flavor	Carbonated Water, Sugar, Caramel Color, Phosphoric Acid, Caffeine, Natural Flavor

== Similar competing drinks ==
In November 2009, Dr Pepper Snapple Group started selling a sugar-sweetened iteration of Dr Pepper called "Heritage Dr Pepper" in response to Pepsi Throwback. Heritage Dr Pepper was later in 2010 rebranded "Dr Pepper Made with Real Sugar" when it became a permanent offering in some markets. Another sugar-sweetened version commonly called Dublin Dr Pepper had previously been available from a single bottling plant in Texas, which continued production until January 2012.

In 2011, Dr Pepper Snapple Group announced "7 UP Retro", a sugar-sweetened version of 7 Up, that would be available for a limited time. This was briefly a direct competitor to PepsiCo's Mountain Dew Throwback, but with 7 UP Retro ceasing production later in the year while Mountain Dew Throwback continued. Mexican 7 Up, which is exported to the United States, still has sugar. Dr Pepper Snapple Group also released in 2021 a 7UP variant called "Simple 7 UP" which contains natural ingredients and a mixture of cane sugar and stevia leaf extract as the sweeteners.

Coca-Cola markets sugar-sweetened versions of their soda in the United States during the Jewish holiday of Passover under the name Kosher Coca-Cola, and sugar-sweetened Mexican Coke is also sold via import year-round. Regional Coca-Cola bottlers in Cleveland, Ohio and Allentown, Pennsylvania started using sugar as a sweetener in 2007. Coca-Cola had previously used sugar rather than high-fructose corn syrup up until 1985, just before the introduction of New Coke.

== See also ==
- Pepsi Raw/Pepsi Natural – another variant with real sugar
- Jones Soda – switched to cane sugar in 2007
