= Pepsi Raw =

Cola soft drink from PepsiCo with natural ingredients

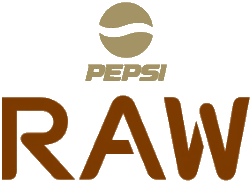

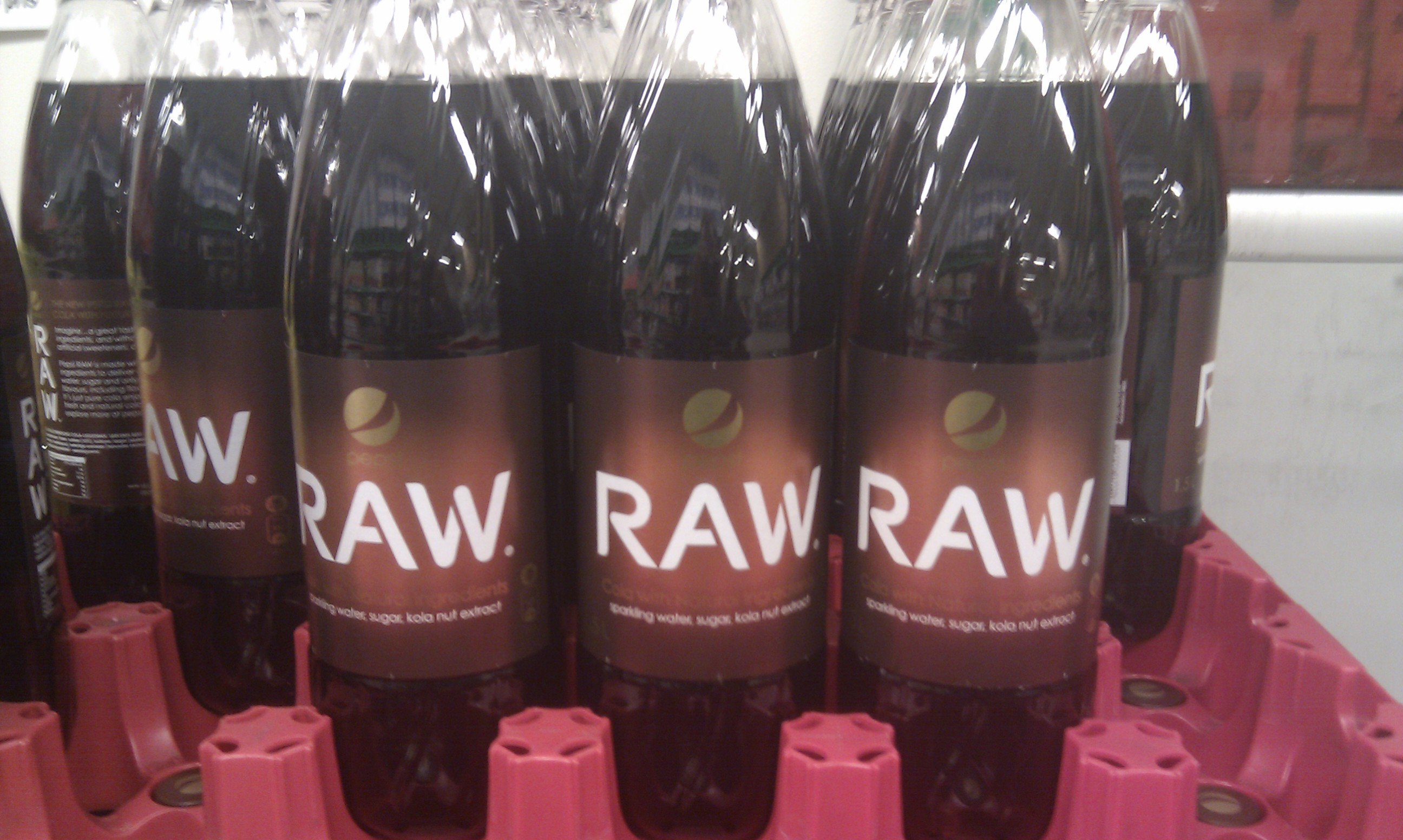
- Bottles of Pepsi Raw
- Type: Cola soft drink
- Manufacturer: PepsiCo
- Origin: United Kingdom
- Introduced: 2008
- Discontinued: 2011; 15 years ago

Pepsi Raw is a cola soft drink created by PepsiCo and Britvic, marketed as a "Sparkling Cola Drink with Natural Plant Extracts". It was first launched in February 2008 in Britain, targeting upmarket pubs. In 2010, Pepsi Raw was launched in Norway, and in 2011 was launched in Australia.

== Ingredients ==
- Sparkling water
- Cane sugar
- Apple extract
- Plain caramel colour
- Natural plant extracts (including natural caffeine and kola nut extract)
- Citric, tartaric and lactic acids
- Gum arabic (stabilizer)
- Xanthan gum (thickener)

== Marketing ==
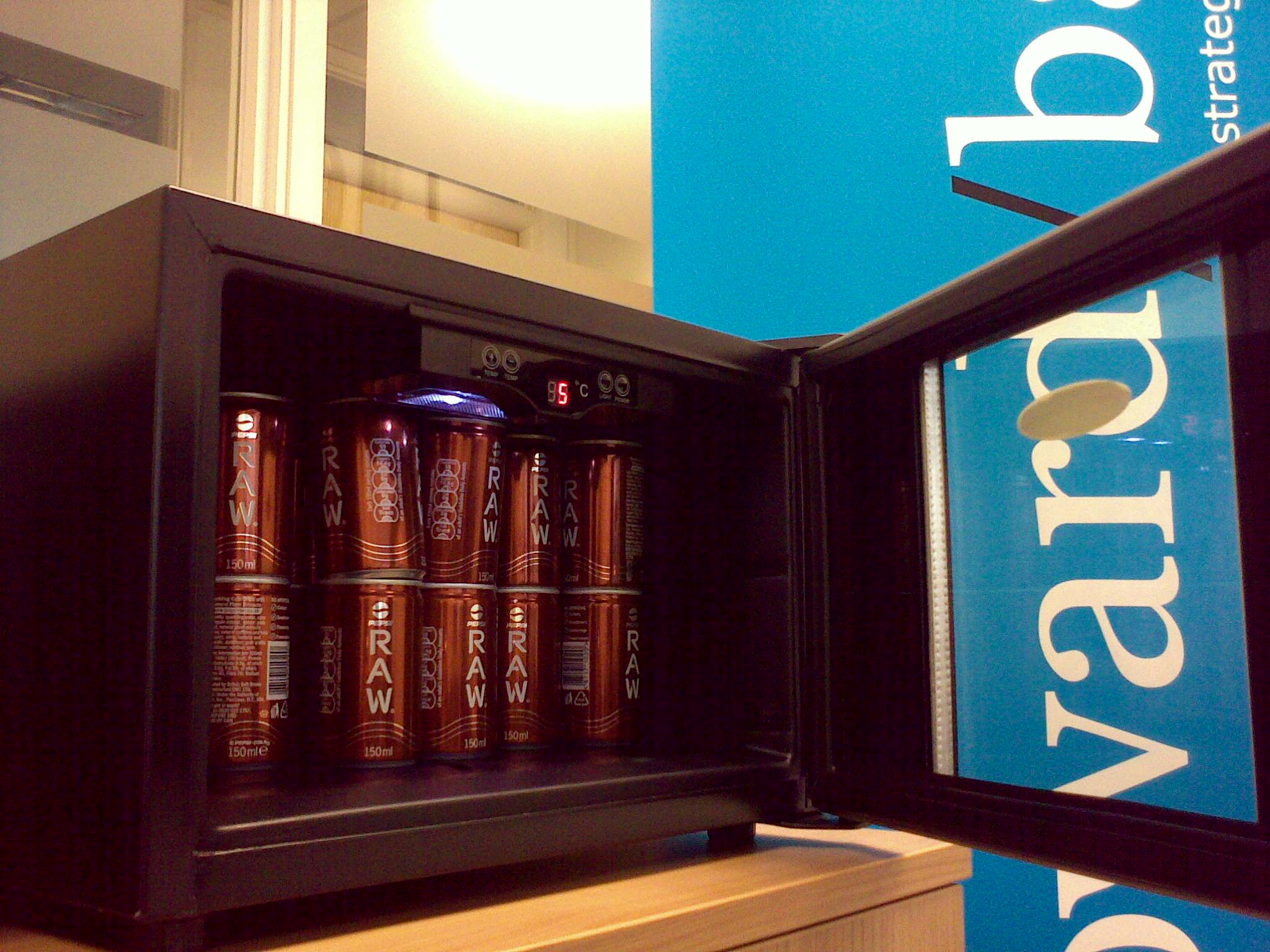
Cans of Pepsi Raw

Pepsi Raw was made with naturally sourced ingredients and contained no artificial flavourings, colourings, preservatives, and sweeteners. Its advertising emphasized those ingredients and promoted the drink as a natural alternative to other colas.

A marketing campaign called "Natural Born Cola" was launched to promote the product. Promotional teams distributed samples at grocery stores, shopping malls, train stations, and offices in key cities. The campaign distributed 1,295,500 bottles of Pepsi Raw. According to the campaign's reported results, 82% of consumers liked the taste and 75% said they would buy it.

== Discontinuation ==
In September 2010, it was announced that Pepsi Raw was to be withdrawn from the British market. Production of the drink in Norway was discontinued in May 2011 due to low demand.

== Legacy ==
=== Pepsi Natural ===
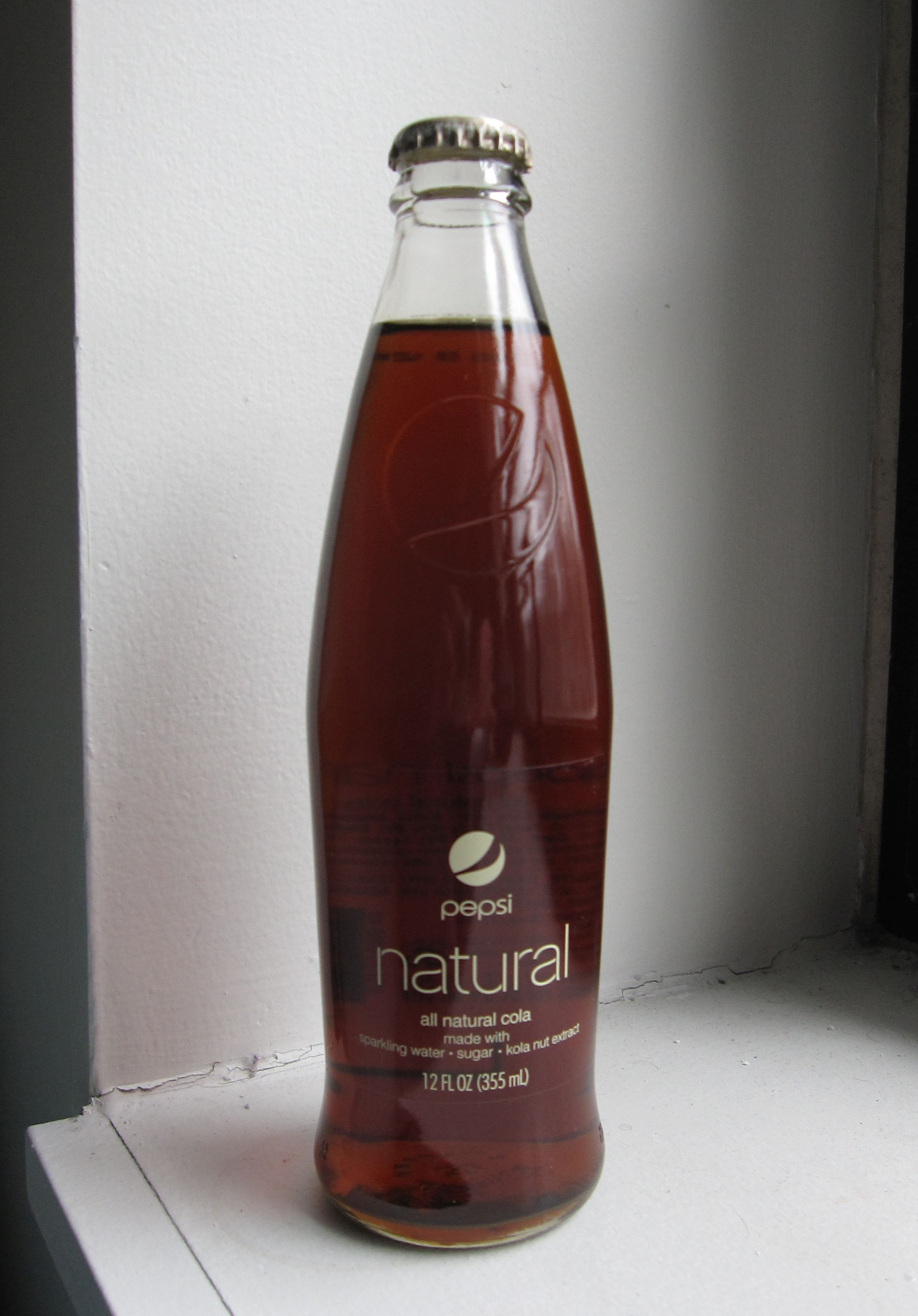
A 12 fl oz bottle of Pepsi Natural

In March 2009, PepsiCo introduced Pepsi Natural in the United States and New Mexico. The drink had a similar recipe to Pepsi Raw and was marketed as a cola made with natural ingredients. (Note: Some focused sources write that they are different according to a representative of PepsiCo, and that their caloric densities are not the same according to their nutrition labels. Some sources vaguely regard them as the same, but they are only passing mentions.) Pepsi Natural was removed from the market in 2010.

=== Pepsi Nama ===
Pepsi Nama was introduced in Japan in 2021 by Suntory, PepsiCo's Japanese distributor. Its marketing emphasized the use of cola spices were not heated during production, making the drink natural. Its Japanese product name's kanji character '生' (nama) is commonly translated as 'Raw' in English. Despite the similarity in their names, Pepsi Nama and Pepsi Raw are separate products. Unlike Pepsi Raw, Pepsi Nama is available in multiple flavors. PepsiCo produces the drink for the Mainland China market, with distribution to Hong Kong and Macao. Taiwanese food market, Vedan produces Pepsi Nama for the Taiwanese market.

== See also ==
- List of defunct consumer brands
