= Pepsi =

Soft drink by PepsiCo

- Logo used since 2023

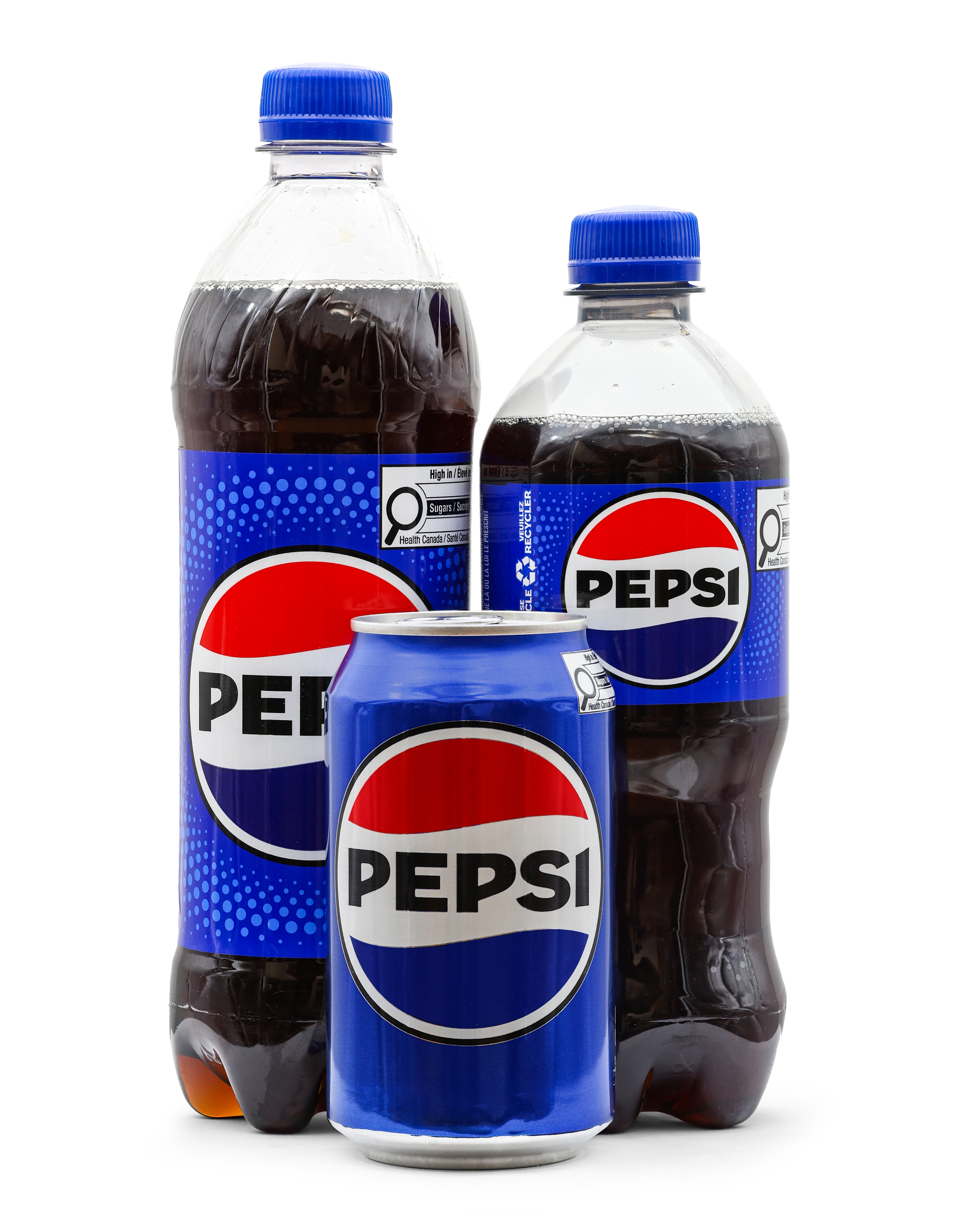
- Assorted Pepsi products
- Type: Cola
- Manufacturer: PepsiCo
- Origin: New Bern, North Carolina
- Introduced: 1893; 133 years ago (as Brad's Drink); 1898; 128 years ago (as Pepsi-Cola); 1961; 65 years ago (as Pepsi)
- Color: Caramel E-150d
- Variants: Diet Pepsi; Pepsi Twist; Pepsi Lime; Pepsi Wild Cherry; Crystal Pepsi; Caffeine-Free Pepsi; Pepsi-Cola Made with Real Sugar; Pepsi Vanilla; Pepsi Zero Sugar; Pepsi Max; Nitro Pepsi
- Related products: Coca-Cola; RC Cola
- Website: pepsi.com

Pepsi is a carbonated soft drink with a cola flavor, the flagship product of PepsiCo. In 2023, Pepsi was the second most valuable soft drink brand worldwide behind Coca-Cola; the two share a long-standing rivalry in what has been called the "cola wars".

Pepsi, originally created in 1893 by Caleb Bradham and named "Brad's Drink," was first sold in his drugstore in New Bern, North Carolina. Renamed "Pepsi-Cola" in 1898 due to its supposed digestive benefits, its name was shortened in marketing to "Pepsi" as early as 1951. Early on, Pepsi struggled with financial stability, going bankrupt in 1923 but was subsequently purchased and revived by Charles Guth, who reformulated the syrup. Pepsi gained popularity with the introduction of a 12-ounce bottle during the Great Depression and marketing strategies like the "Nickel, Nickel" jingle, doubling sales by emphasizing its value.

The mid-20th century saw Pepsi targeting the African American market, a then-untapped demographic, with positive portrayals and endorsements from prominent figures, boosting its market share. Pepsi's rivalry with Coca-Cola, highlighted by the "cola wars", led to significant cultural and market competition, including the "Pepsi Challenge" taste tests and the introduction of New Coke in response. Pepsi's expansion into international markets has seen varied success, with notable ventures into the Soviet Union via a landmark barter deal and enduring popularity in certain regions over Coca-Cola.

Despite occasional controversies, such as an aborted Madonna advertisement and the "Pepsi Number Fever" fiasco in the Philippines, Pepsi has remained a prominent global brand, partly thanks to innovative marketing campaigns and sponsorships in sports and entertainment. PepsiCo have also launched other drinks under the Pepsi brand, such as Diet Pepsi and Pepsi Max, that make up the brand portfolio today on top of the original Pepsi cola.

== History ==
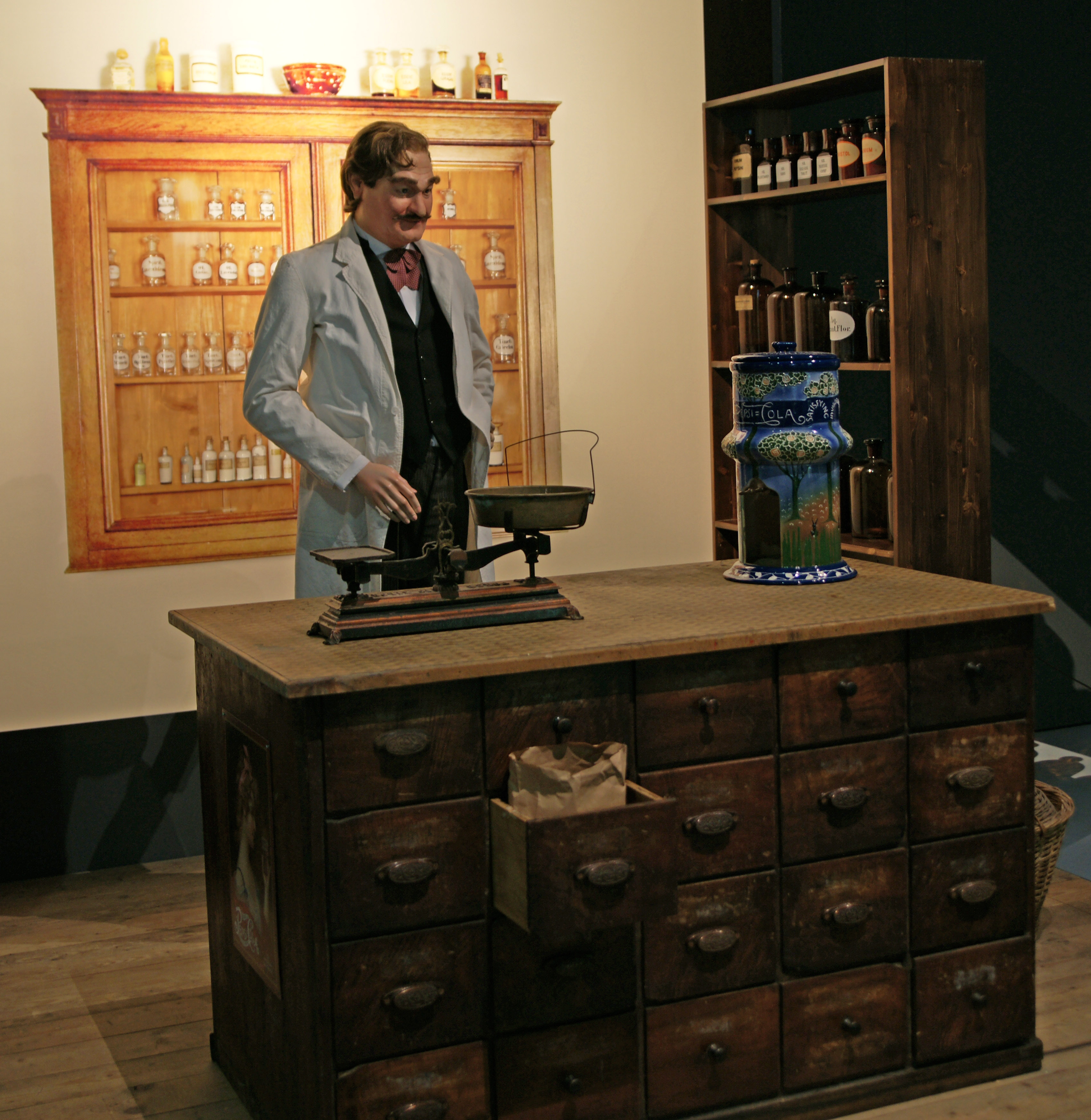
The pharmacy of Caleb Bradham, with a Pepsi dispenser

Pepsi was invented in 1893 as "Brad's Drink" by Caleb Bradham, who sold the drink at his drugstore in New Bern, North Carolina. Bradham sought to create a fountain drink that was appealing and would aid in digestion and boost energy.

It was renamed "Pepsi-Cola" in 1898 due to its formula's inclusion of essence of pepsin. This was a then-common medicinal preparation made from the digestive enzyme pepsin, with glycerin and a mild alcohol added. It was often used as an additive to make bitter medicines palatable, as well as for curdling milk. Although this point is seemingly disputed by modern writers, the earliest print advertisements for the beverage carried the subtitle "The Pepsin Drink", and boasted its presence for the sake of relieving indigestion (dyspepsia), as well as alleviating headaches and drowsiness. A key selling point in a 1902 advertisement claimed that a glass of Pepsi-Cola contained a teaspoon's worth of the concoction. The original recipe also included sugar and vanilla.

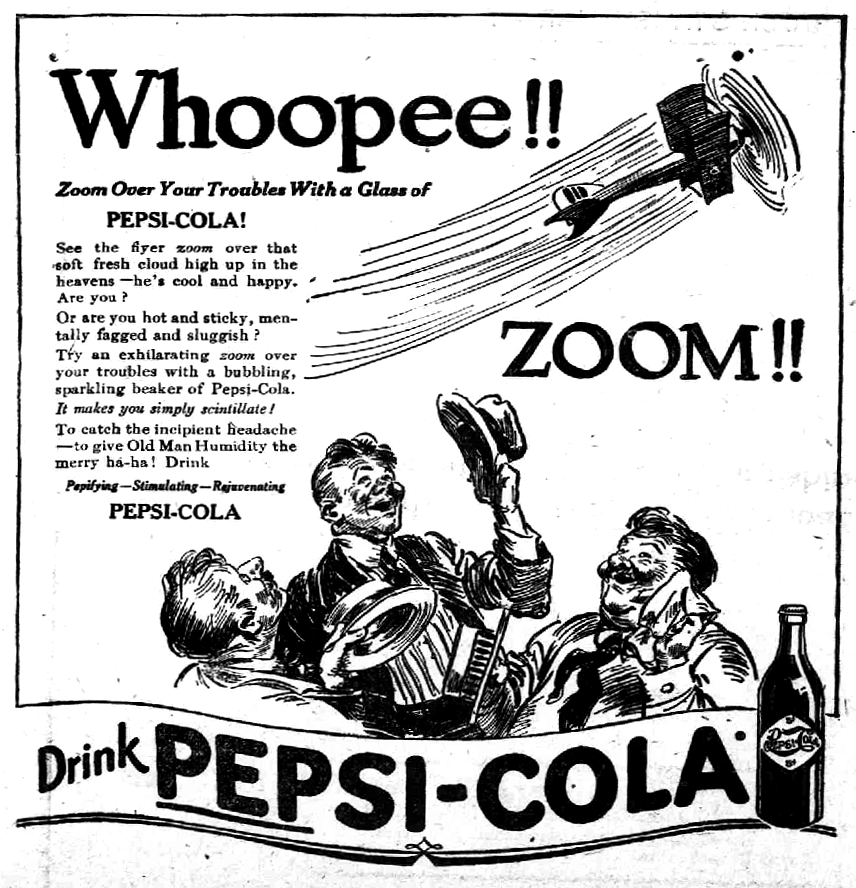
A 1919 newspaper ad for Pepsi-Cola

Bradham incorporated the Pepsi-Cola Company on December 24, 1902, and moved the bottling of Pepsi from his drugstore to a rented warehouse in 1903. That year, Bradham sold 7,968 gallons of syrup. The next year, Pepsi introduced in six-ounce bottles, and sales increased to 19,848 gallons. In 1909, automobile race pioneer Barney Oldfield was the first celebrity to endorse Pepsi, describing it as "A bully drink...refreshing, invigorating, a fine bracer before a race." The advertising theme "Delicious and Healthful" was then used over the next two decades.

In 1923, the Pepsi-Cola Company entered bankruptcy—in large part due to financial losses incurred by speculating on the wildly fluctuating sugar prices as a result of World War I. Assets were sold and Roy C. Megargel bought the Pepsi trademark. Megargel was unsuccessful in efforts to find funding to revive the brand and soon Pepsi-Cola's assets were purchased by Charles Guth, the president of Loft, Inc..

Loft was a candy manufacturer with retail stores that contained soda fountains. He sought to replace Coca-Cola at his stores' fountains after The Coca-Cola Company refused to give him additional discounts on syrup. Guth then had Loft's chemists reformulate the Pepsi-Cola syrup formula. On three occasions between 1922 and 1933, the Coca-Cola Company was offered the opportunity to purchase the Pepsi-Cola Company, which it declined on each occasion.

=== Growth in popularity ===
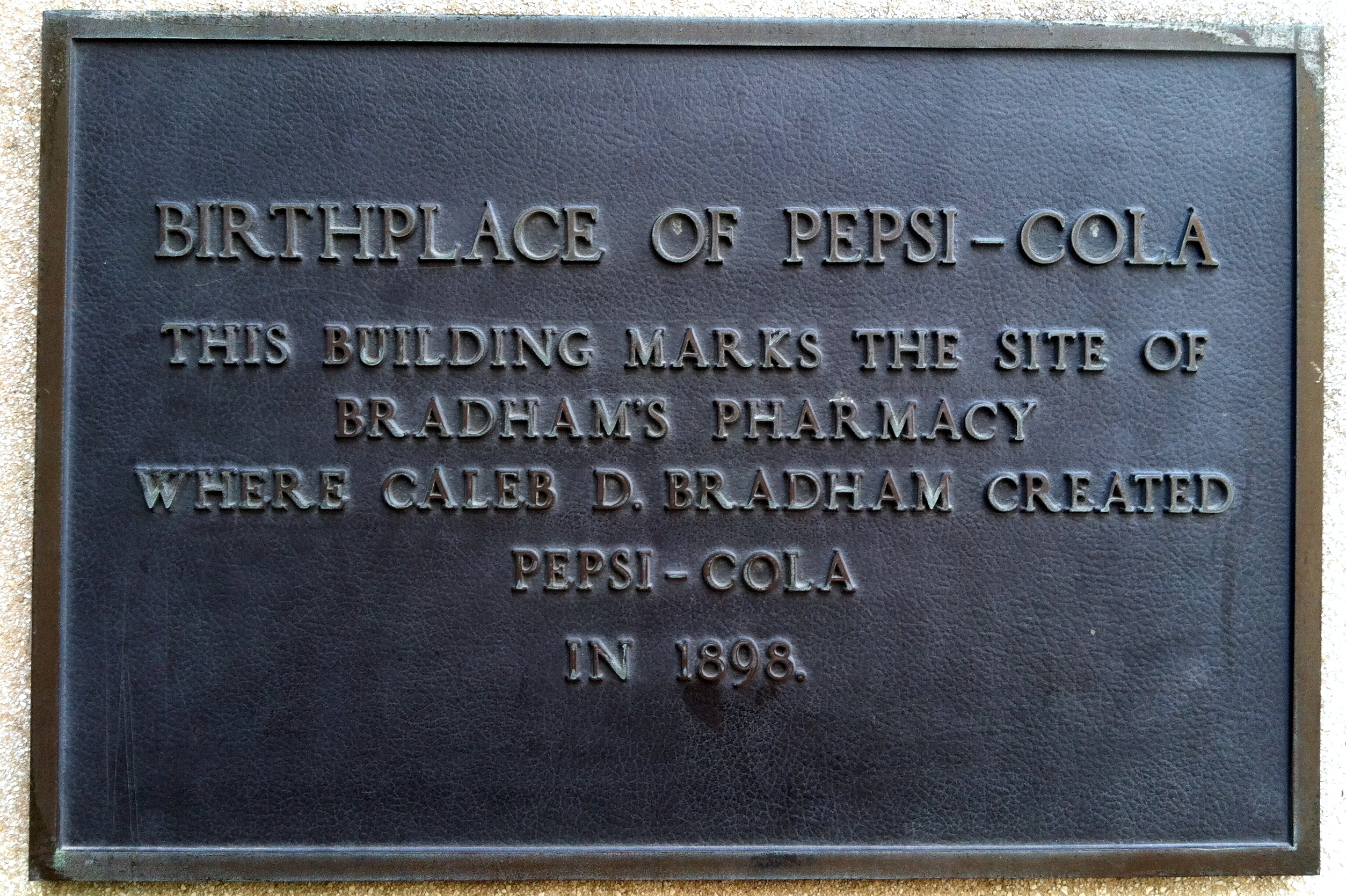
A plaque at 256 Middle Street, New Bern, North Carolina

During the Great Depression, Pepsi gained popularity following the introduction in 1934 of a 12-ounce (355 mL) bottle. Prior to that, Pepsi and Coca-Cola sold their drinks in 6.5-ounce (192 mL) servings for about $0.05 a bottle. With a radio advertising campaign featuring the popular jingle "Nickel, Nickel" – first recorded by the Tune Twisters in 1940 – Pepsi encouraged price-conscious consumers to double the volume their nickels could purchase. The jingle is arranged in a way that loops, creating a never-ending tune:

"Pepsi-Cola hits the spot / Twelve full ounces, that's a lot / Twice as much for a nickel, too / Pepsi-Cola is the drink for you."

Coming at a time of economic crisis, the campaign succeeded in boosting Pepsi's status. From 1936 to 1938, Pepsi-Cola's profits doubled.

Pepsi's success under Charles Guth came while the Loft Candy business was faltering. Since he had initially used Loft's finances and facilities to establish the new Pepsi success, the near-bankrupt Loft Company sued Guth for possession of the Pepsi-Cola company. A long legal battle, Guth v. Loft Inc., then ensued, with the case reaching the Delaware Supreme Court and ultimately ending in a loss for Guth.

The Pepsi-Cola name was shortened to simply "Pepsi" as early as 1945, when their bottles transitioned from standard paper labels to the applied color label (ACL) process, which involved screen-printing enamel paint graphics directly onto the bottle at a high temperature. The neck of the new bottle design displayed a small ovoid Pepsi-Cola logo in color on the front, and a truncated version of the script reading "Pepsi" on the opposite side. This motif was carried over when a new bottle design and logo were introduced in mid-1951. When the drink was rebranded in 1962, two versions of the same logo with either name were used interchangeably. By 1969, the drink was almost exclusively referred to as "Pepsi", with the full name retained for secondary uses.

=== Second half of the 20th century ===
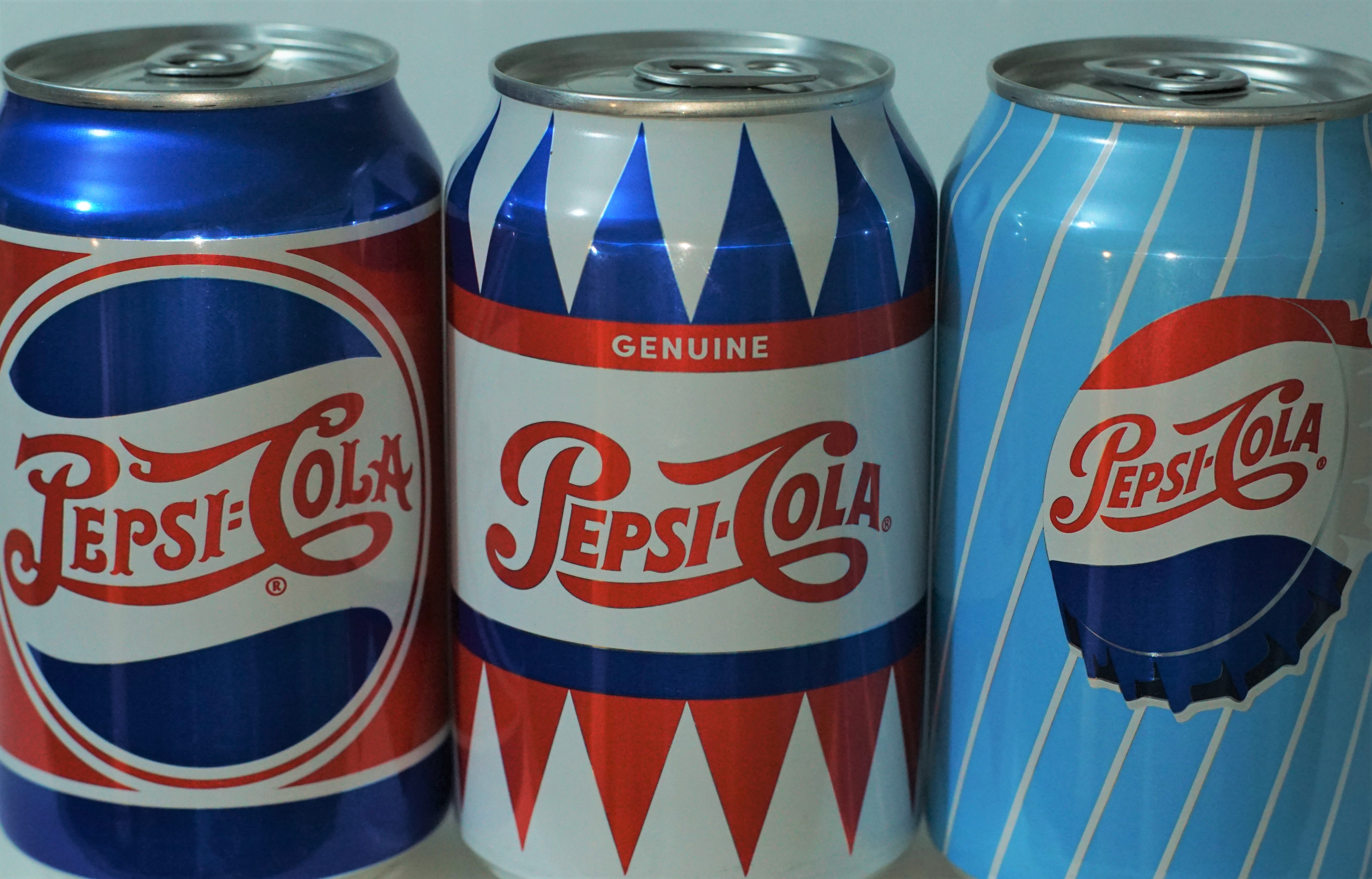
Pepsi cans styled with old designs from the 1940s, 1950s and 1960s respectively

Pepsi-Cola began a continuous rise in popularity and sales growth starting in the 1950s under the leadership of Alfred Steele and later Donald M. Kendall. With Pepsi having been seen as a "poor man's Coca-Cola" that was "popular in the kitchen but it rarely arrived in the parlor", Steele gravitated production from economy to quality. The sugar content in Pepsi-Cola syrup was also lowered slightly to desweeten the taste. Combined with company and production changes, Pepsi sales boomed by 1956 and gradually narrowed the gap to its large competitor.

By the mid 1950s, amid a time when cola products were booming all over the world, the drink was being bottled in over 700 plants across seventy countries. These helped make Pepsi-Cola a popular product in many markets, including in the Middle East following the opening of a plant in Cairo, and the Beirut Daily Star referred to the "Pepsi-Cola culture" when distribution began in Lebanon in 1952. Notably, in 1974 Pepsi became the first American consumer product to be produced, marketed and sold in the Soviet Union.

In 1958, the "swirl" design bottle began to be used for distributing Pepsi. In 1963, Pepsi began to be distributed in America in larger 16-ounce (473 mL) bottles, and 12-ounce cans were introduced. In 1964, Diet Pepsi was launched, the first extension of the brand.

Beginning in the mid 1960s, aggressive and effective marketing of the product, see Pepsi Generation and Pepsi Challenge, mostly aimed at the younger generation, drastically increased the drink's popularity to become a formidable competitor to long-time market leader Coca-Cola. In 1969, Pepsi machines were installed in the White House cafeteria when Richard Nixon, who already had a close relationship with Pepsi, assumed the American presidency. Although total Pepsi sales never overtook Coca-Cola, Coca-Cola's lead in the American market was narrowed to 1½-to-1 in 1980, from 5-to-1 in 1950, and Pepsi was outselling its rival in the "take-home" market, which includes supermarkets.

In November 1984, PepsiCo announced that it would, at least in the US, exclusively use high-fructose corn syrup (HFCS) to sweeten its canned, bottled and fountain Pepsi-Cola, replacing cane sugar. The Coca-Cola Company did the same around the same time.

== Ingredients ==
Pepsi
Nutritional value per 12 fl oz (355 ml)
- Energy: 150 kcal (630 kJ)
- Carbohydrates: 41
- Sugars: 41
- Dietary fiber: 0
- Fat: 0
- Saturated: 0
- Trans: 0
- Protein: 0
Vitamins and minerals
| Vitamins | Quantity %DV^{†} |
| Vitamin A equiv. | 0% 0 μg |
| Vitamin C | 0% 0 mg |
| Minerals | Quantity %DV^{†} |
| Calcium | 0% 0 mg |
| Iron | 0% 0 mg |
| Potassium | 0% 0 mg |
| Sodium | 1% 15 mg |
- Other constituents: Quantity
- Cholesterol: 0
- ^{†}Percentages estimated using US recommendations for adults, except for potassium, which is estimated based on expert recommendation from the National Academies.

Pepsi may have small formula differences depending on where it is produced and the target market. In the United States, Pepsi cola is made with carbonated water, high fructose corn syrup, caramel color, sugar, phosphoric acid, caffeine, citric acid, and natural flavors. A 12 fl oz (355 mL) can of Pepsi has 41 grams of carbohydrates (all from sugars), 30 mg of sodium, 0 grams of fat, 0 grams of protein, 38 mg of caffeine, and 150 calories. The Canadian equivalent can has mostly the same except 42 grams of carbohydrates (of which 41 g is sugar) and 35 mg of sodium.

Caffeine-Free Pepsi contains the same ingredients but without the caffeine.

In many countries since the 2020s, a new Pepsi formulation has been distributed in bottles and cans with the reduction of sugar content and the addition of artificial sweeteners Acesulfame K and Sucralose. It replaced the original formulation in many regions including Argentina and across Europe since at least 2021, with sugar being reduced by over one third from approximately 10.7 g to 7.0 g (per 100 mL) in some countries. In Western Europe, sugar was cut by more than half, to 4.6 g per 100 mL.

The new formulation also came into effect in Australia in 2025, with sugar reduced by one-third. The change was done as part of PepsiCo's pro-health commitment across all its brands, and the increasing sugar taxes and regulations all around the world.

== Variants and portfolio ==
Today the Pepsi portfolio consists of three main major brands: the regular Pepsi (since 1893), Diet Pepsi/Pepsi Light (since 1964) and Pepsi Max (since 1993, intertwines with Pepsi Zero Sugar). The latter are low-calorie products. Caffeine-Free Pepsi has been produced since 1982. A retro-themed drink made of cane sugar is sold exclusively in North America, called Pepsi Throwback.

Since the 1970s, Pepsi have distributed a large variety of flavors blended with the cola, such as Pepsi Wild Cherry (cherry flavored) and Pepsi Twist (lemon flavored), and has experimented with special limited editions and country-exclusive Pepsi colas.

=== Fictional drinks ===
A vitamin-enriched Pepsi variation called "Pepsi Perfect" in a special bottle was shown in the 1989 movie Back to the Future Part II in scenes set in the future year 2015. This was in 2015 released as a limited-edition drink. Only 6,500 bottles were available for $20.15, they have since been sold for hundreds of dollars on eBay.

== Marketing ==
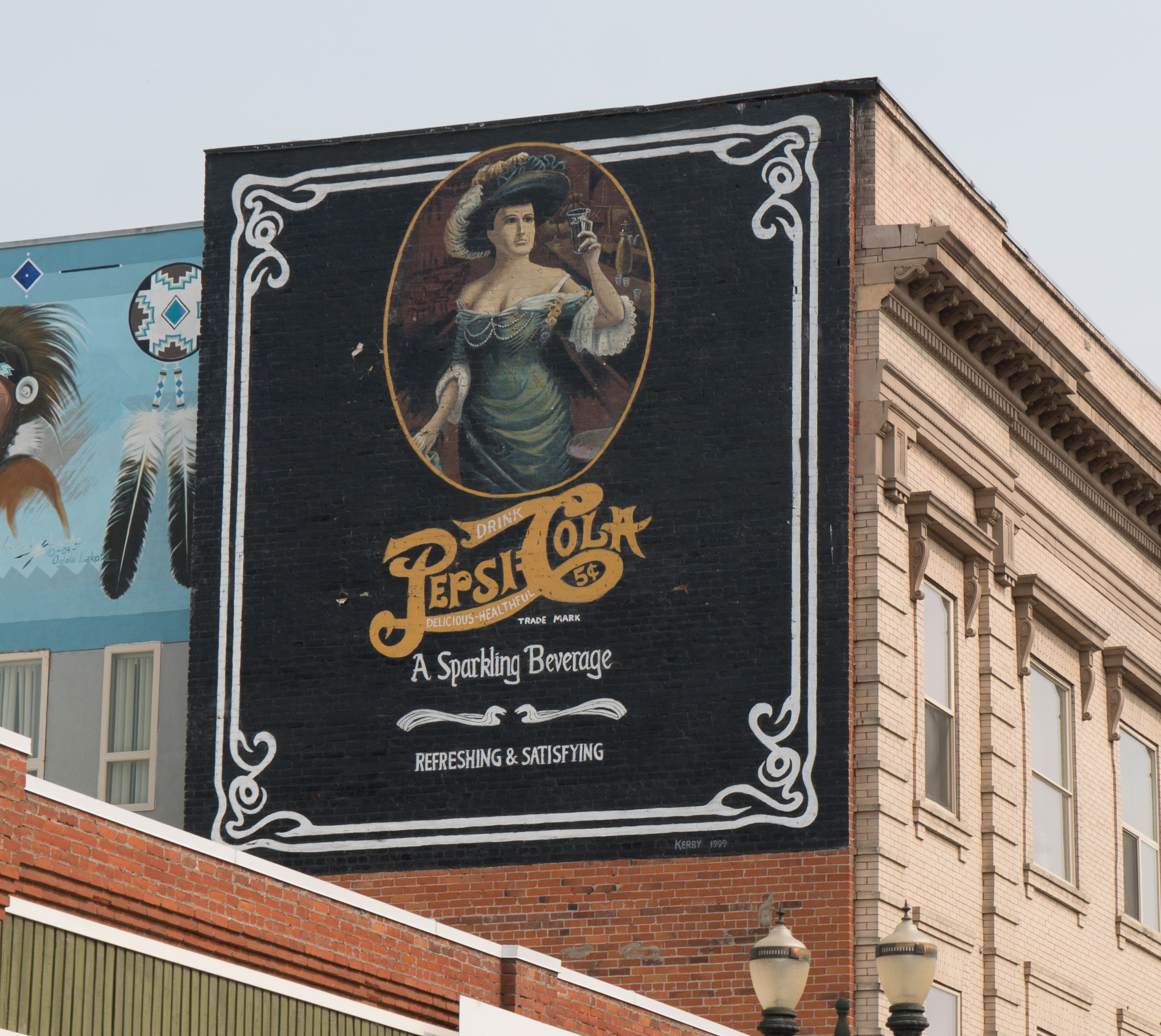
An old Pepsi-Cola advertising mural in Toppenish, Washington

From the 1930s to the late 1950s, "Pepsi-Cola Hits The Spot" was the most commonly used slogan in the days of old-time radio, classic motion pictures and early days of television. Its jingle, conceived in the days when Pepsi cost only five cents, was used in many different forms with different lyrics. With the rise of radio, Pepsi-Cola utilized the services of a young, up-and-coming actress named Polly Bergen to promote products, oftentimes, lending her singing talents to the classic "...Hits The Spot" jingle.

Film actress Joan Crawford, after marrying Pepsi-Cola president Alfred N. Steele became a spokesperson for Pepsi, appearing in commercials, television specials, and televised beauty pageants on behalf of the company. Crawford also had images of the soft drink placed prominently in several of her later films. When Steele died in 1959, Crawford was appointed to the Board of Directors of Pepsi-Cola, a position she held until 1973, although she was not a board member of the larger PepsiCo, created in 1965.

Pepsi has been featured in several films, including Back to the Future Part II (1989), Home Alone (1990), Wayne's World (1992), Fight Club (1999), World War Z (2013), and in films directed by Spike Lee.

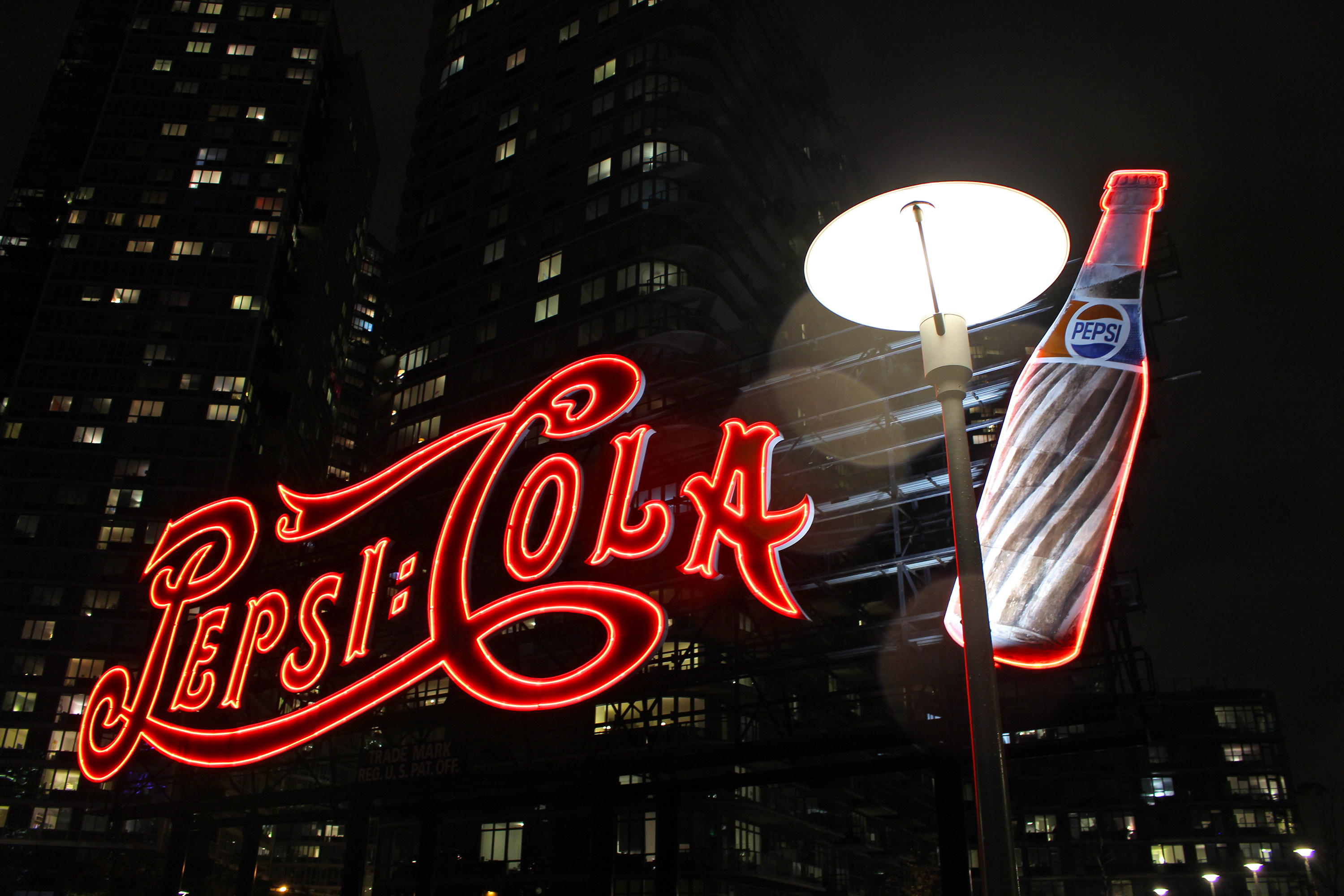
The large Pepsi-Cola sign in New York City illuminated

Pepsi marketing has also been marred in controversy. In 1989, Pepsi commissioned a $5 million marketing campaign to coincide with the release of Madonna's song "Like a Prayer", but was cancelled following strong backlash regarding the religious themes in the song's music video. In 1992, the Pepsi Number Fever marketing campaign in the Philippines accidentally distributed 800,000 winning bottle caps for a 1 million peso grand prize, leading to riots and the deaths of five people.

In 1996, PepsiCo launched the highly successful Pepsi Stuff marketing strategy. "Project Blue" was launched in several international markets outside the United States in April. The launch included extravagant publicity stunts, such as a Concorde airplane painted in blue colors, which was owned by Air France, and a banner on the Mir space station. The Project Blue design was first tested in the United States in June 1997, and was released that December in preparation for Pepsi's 100th anniversary. It was at this point, the logo began to be referred to as the Pepsi Globe.

From 1986 to 2003, the Pepsi wordmark was typeset in a custom treatment of Handel Gothic. This logo was also used for Pepsi Throwback until 2014. In October 2008, Pepsi announced that it would redesign its logo and re-brand many of its products by early 2009. In 2009, Pepsi, Diet Pepsi, and Pepsi Max began using all lower-case fonts for name brands. The brand's blue and red globe trademark became a series of "smiles," with the central white band initially arcing at different angles depending on the product.

In March 2023, Pepsi unveiled a new logo expected to launch in North America in late-2023, and internationally in 2024, including 2025 in Colombia. The logo is a modernization of the "vintage" Pepsi logo. Accompanying branding elements will shift from blue to black as their primary color.

Selected logo history for Pepsi

The original stylized Pepsi-Cola wordmark, used from 1898 until 1905

The stylized Pepsi-Cola wordmark used from 1951 to 1971. Reused for some special products since 2014. Also used for the Pepsi-Cola sign in Queens, NY.

The Pepsi Globe logo used from 1971 to 1986. Reused for special products from 2009–14.

The Pepsi globe and wordmark used from 1997 to 2003

The Pepsi globe and wordmark used from 2014 to 2023

The current Pepsi globe logo since August 23, 2023

=== Niche marketing ===
Walter Mack was named the new president of Pepsi-Cola and guided the company through the 1940s. Mack, who supported progressive causes, noticed that the company's strategy of using advertising for a general audience either ignored African Americans or used ethnic stereotypes in portraying Blacks. Up until the 1940s, the full revenue potential of what was called "the Negro market" was largely ignored by white-owned manufacturers in the U.S.

Mack realized that Black people were an untapped niche market and that Pepsi stood to gain market share by targeting its advertising directly towards them. To this end, he hired Hennan Smith, an advertising executive "from the Negro newspaper field" to lead an all-black sales team, which had to be cut due to the onset of World War II.

A 1940s advertisement specifically targeting African Americans, an untapped niche market that was largely ignored by white-owned manufacturers in the U.S. A young Ron Brown is the boy reaching for a bottle.

In 1947, Walter Mack resumed his efforts, hiring Edward F. Boyd to lead a twelve-man team. They came up with advertising portraying black Americans in a positive light, such as one with a smiling mother holding a six pack of Pepsi while her son (a young Ron Brown, who grew up to be Secretary of Commerce) reaches up for one. Another ad campaign, titled "Leaders in Their Fields", profiled twenty prominent African Americans such as Nobel Peace Prize winner Ralph Bunche and photographer Gordon Parks.

Boyd also led a sales team composed entirely of blacks around the country to promote Pepsi. Racial segregation and Jim Crow laws were still in place throughout much of the U.S.; Boyd's team faced a great deal of discrimination as a result, from insults by Pepsi co-workers to threats by the Ku Klux Klan. On the other hand, it was able to use its anti-racism stance as a selling point, attacking Coke's reluctance to hire blacks and support by the chairman of The Coca-Cola Company for segregationist governor of Georgia Herman Talmadge. As a result, Pepsi's market share as compared to Coca-Cola's shot up dramatically in the 1950s with African American soft-drink consumers three times more likely to purchase Pepsi over Coke. After the sales team visited Chicago, Pepsi's share in the city overtook that of Coke for the first time.

Journalist Stephanie Capparell interviewed six men who were on the team in the late 1940s. The team members had a grueling schedule, working seven days a week, morning and night, for weeks on end. They visited bottlers, churches, ladies groups, schools, college campuses, YMCAs, community centers, insurance conventions, teacher and doctor conferences, and various civic organizations. They got famous jazzmen such as Duke Ellington and Lionel Hampton to promote Pepsi from the stage. No group was too small or too large to target for a promotion.

Pepsi advertisements avoided the stereotypical images common in the major media that depicted Aunt Jemimas and Uncle Bens, whose role was to draw a smile from white customers. Instead, it portrayed black customers as self-confident middle-class citizens who showed very good taste in their soft drinks. They were economical too, as Pepsi bottles were twice the size.

This focus on the market for black people caused some consternation within the company and among its affiliates. It did not want to seem focused on black customers for fear white customers would be pushed away. In a national meeting, Mack tried to assuage the 500 bottlers in attendance by pandering to them, saying "We don't want it to become known as a nigger drink." After Mack left the company in 1950, support for the black sales team faded and it was cut.

Boyd was replaced in 1952 by Harvey C. Russell Jr., who was notable for his marketing campaigns towards black youth in New Orleans. These campaigns, held at locales attended largely by black children, would encourage children to collect Pepsi bottle caps, which they could then exchange for rewards. One example is Pepsi's 1954 "Pepsi Day at the Beach" event, where New Orleans children could ride rides at an amusement park in exchange for Pepsi bottle caps. By the end of the event, 125,000 bottle caps been collected. According to The Pepsi Cola World, the New Orleans campaign was a success; once people's supply of bottle caps ran out, the only way they could get more was to buy more Pepsi.

=== Rivalry with Coca-Cola ===
According to Consumer Reports, in the 1970s, the rivalry continued to heat up the market. Pepsi conducted blind taste tests in stores, in what was called the "Pepsi Challenge". These tests suggested that more consumers preferred the taste of Pepsi to Coca-Cola. The sales of Pepsi started to climb, and Pepsi kicked off the "Challenge" across the nation. This became known as the "cola wars".

In 1985, The Coca-Cola Company, amid much publicity, changed its formula. The theory has been advanced that New Coke, as the reformulated drink came to be known, was invented specifically in response to the Pepsi Challenge. However, a consumer backlash led to Coca-Cola quickly reintroducing the original formula as "Coca-Cola Classic".

In 1989, Billy Joel mentioned the rivalry between the two companies in the song "We Didn't Start the Fire". The line "Rock & Roller Cola Wars" refers to Pepsi and Coke's usage of various musicians in advertising campaigns. Coke used Paula Abdul, while Pepsi used Michael Jackson. Both companies then competed to get other musicians to advertise its beverages.

According to Beverage Digest's 2008 report on carbonated soft drinks, PepsiCo's U.S. market share is 30.8 percent, while The Coca-Cola Company's is 42.7 percent (this includes all their respective brands). Coca-Cola outsells Pepsi in most parts of the U.S., notable exceptions being central Appalachia, Montana, North Dakota, and Utah. In the city of Buffalo, New York, Pepsi outsells Coca-Cola by a two-to-one margin. As of 2024, Pepsi had fallen behind Coca-Cola and Dr Pepper as the third most popular soft drink in the United States, losing its second place spot to the aforementioned Dr Pepper, a position it had held since 1985.

While total American Pepsi sales figures never overtook that of Coca-Cola (with the special exception of 1985 when Coca-Cola sales were fractured between New Coke and Coca-Cola Classic), in corporate terms, the PepsiCo company had overtaken the Coca-Cola Company in total corporate sales in 1979, partly driven by PepsiCo's wide range of non-beverage products (after its merger with Frito-Lay in 1965).

==== Around the world ====
Overall, Coca-Cola continues to outsell Pepsi in almost all areas of the world, except for Oman, India, Saudi Arabia, Pakistan, Egypt,, Peru, Myanmar, the Dominican Republic, Guatemala, and the Canadian provinces of Quebec, Newfoundland and Labrador, Prince Edward Island, Nova Scotia and New Brunswick.. Pepsi is not sold in Russia, Cuba and North Korea. Pepsi had long been the drink of French-Canadians, and it continues to hold its dominance by relying on local Québécois celebrities (especially Claude Meunier, of La Petite Vie fame) to sell its product. PepsiCo introduced the Quebec slogan "here, it's Pepsi" (Ici, c'est Pepsi) in response to Coca-Cola ads proclaiming "Around the world, it's Coke" (Partout dans le monde, c'est Coke).

In India, by most accounts, Coca-Cola was India's leading soft drink until 1977, when it left India because of the new foreign exchange laws which mandated majority shareholding in companies to be held by Indian shareholders; Coca-Cola was unwilling to dilute its stake in its Indian unit as required by the Foreign Exchange Regulation Act, which would have forced them to share their formula with an entity in which it did not have majority shareholding. In 1988, PepsiCo entered the Indian market by creating a joint venture with the government of Punjab-owned Punjab Agro Industrial Corporation and Voltas India Limited. This joint venture marketed and sold Lehar Pepsi until 1991, when the use of foreign brands was allowed; PepsiCo promptly bought out its partners and ended the joint venture in 1994. In 1993, Coca-Cola returned to the Indian market in pursuance of India's liberalization policy. As of 2012, Pepsi is the third most popular carbonated drink in India, with a 15% market share, behind Sprite and Thums Up. In comparison, Coca-Cola is the fourth most popular carbonated drink, occupying a mere 8.8% of the Indian market share.

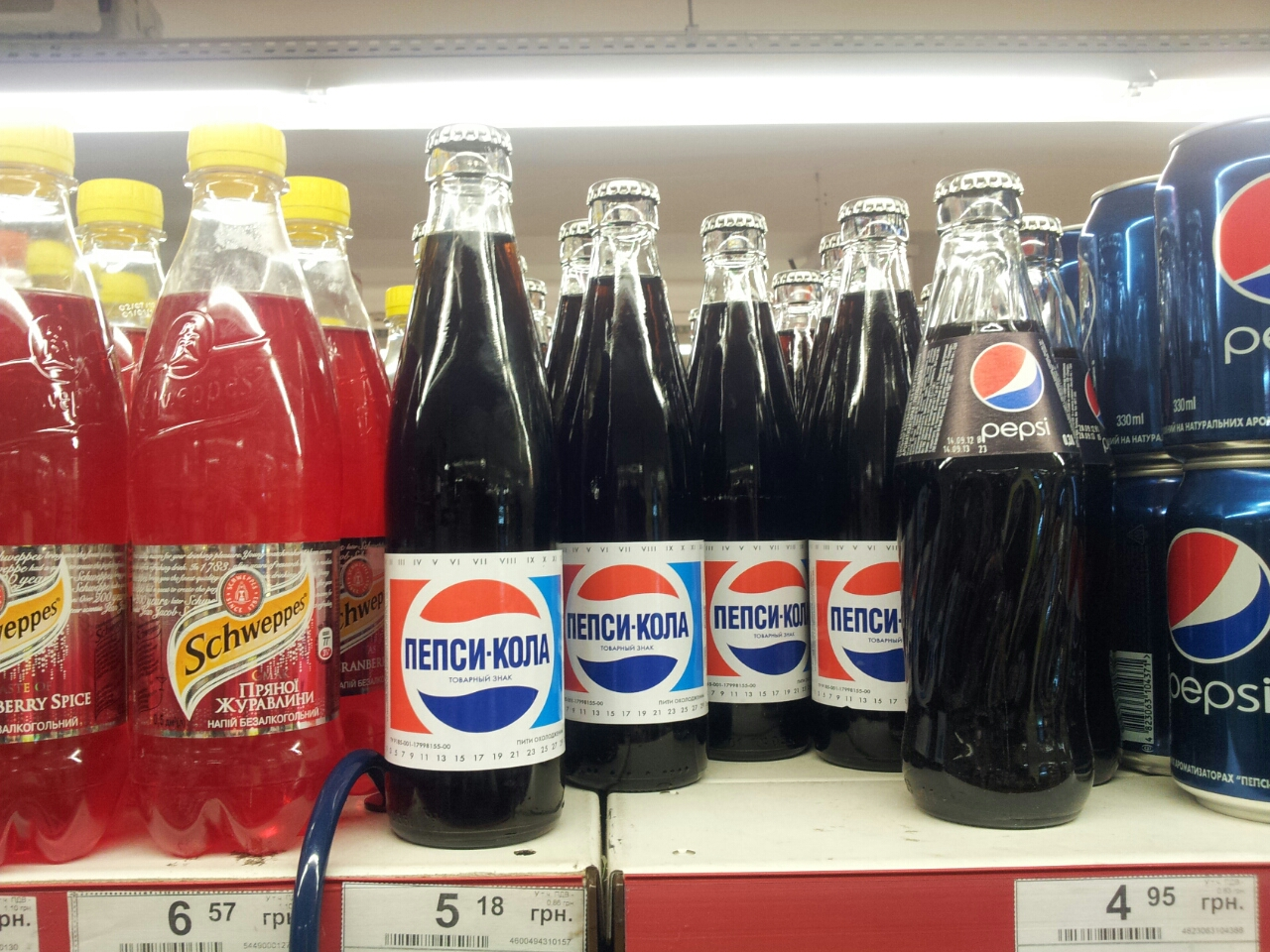
Pepsi bottles in Soviet period style in supermarket in Kyiv, Ukraine

In Russia, Pepsi initially had a larger market share than Coke, but it was undercut once the Cold War ended. In 1972, PepsiCo struck a barter agreement with the government of the Soviet Union, in which PepsiCo was granted exportation and Western marketing rights to Stolichnaya vodka in exchange for importation and Soviet marketing of Pepsi. This exchange led to Pepsi being the first foreign product sanctioned for sale in the Soviet Union. Reminiscent of the way that Coca-Cola became a cultural icon and its global spread spawned words like "cocacolonization", Pepsi and its relation to the Soviet system turned it into an icon. In the early 1990s, the term "Pepsi-stroika" began appearing as a pun on "perestroika", the reform policy of the Soviet Union under Mikhail Gorbachev. Critics viewed the policy as an attempt to usher in Western products in deals there with the old elites; Pepsi, as one of the first American products in the Soviet Union, became a symbol of that relationship and the Soviet policy, reflected in Russian author Victor Pelevin's book Generation P. In 1992, following the dissolution of the Soviet Union, Coca-Cola was introduced to the Russian market and rapidly captured a significant market share due to public perceptions of Coca-Cola as representative of the new post-Soviet system (as opposed to Pepsi being exemplary of the old Soviet era), a market growth that might otherwise have required years to achieve. By July 2005, Coca-Cola enjoyed a market share of 19.4 percent, followed by Pepsi with 13 percent.

Pepsi was introduced in Romania in 1966, during the early liberalization policies of Nicolae Ceaușescu, opening a factory at Constanța in 1967. This was done as a barter agreement similar to the one in the USSR, with Romanian wine serving as their bartered drink sold in the West. Pepsi quickly became popular in Romania, especially among young people, but due to the austerity measures imposed in the 1980s, it became scarce and difficult to find. After the fall of Soviet communism in 1991, PepsiCo entered the new Romanian market economy, and still maintains a bigger popularity than Coca-Cola, which was introduced in Romania in 1992, despite heavy competition during the 1990s (sometime between 2000 and 2005, Pepsi overtook Coca-Cola in sales in Romania).

In 1984, Venezuela was cited as the only country where Pepsi cola sales were higher than Coca-Cola.

Pepsi did not sell soft drinks in Israel until 1991. Many Israelis and some American Jewish organizations attributed Pepsi's previous reluctance to expand operations in Israel to fears of an Arab boycott. Pepsi, which has a large and lucrative business in the Arab world, denied the claims, stating that economic, rather than political, reasons kept it out of Israel.

Pepsi entered the market in Vietnam in 1994 after the end of an American trade embargo against the country. Both Pepsi and Coca-Cola immediately launched following the end of the embargo, starting a 'cola war' in Vietnam.

=== Pepsiman ===
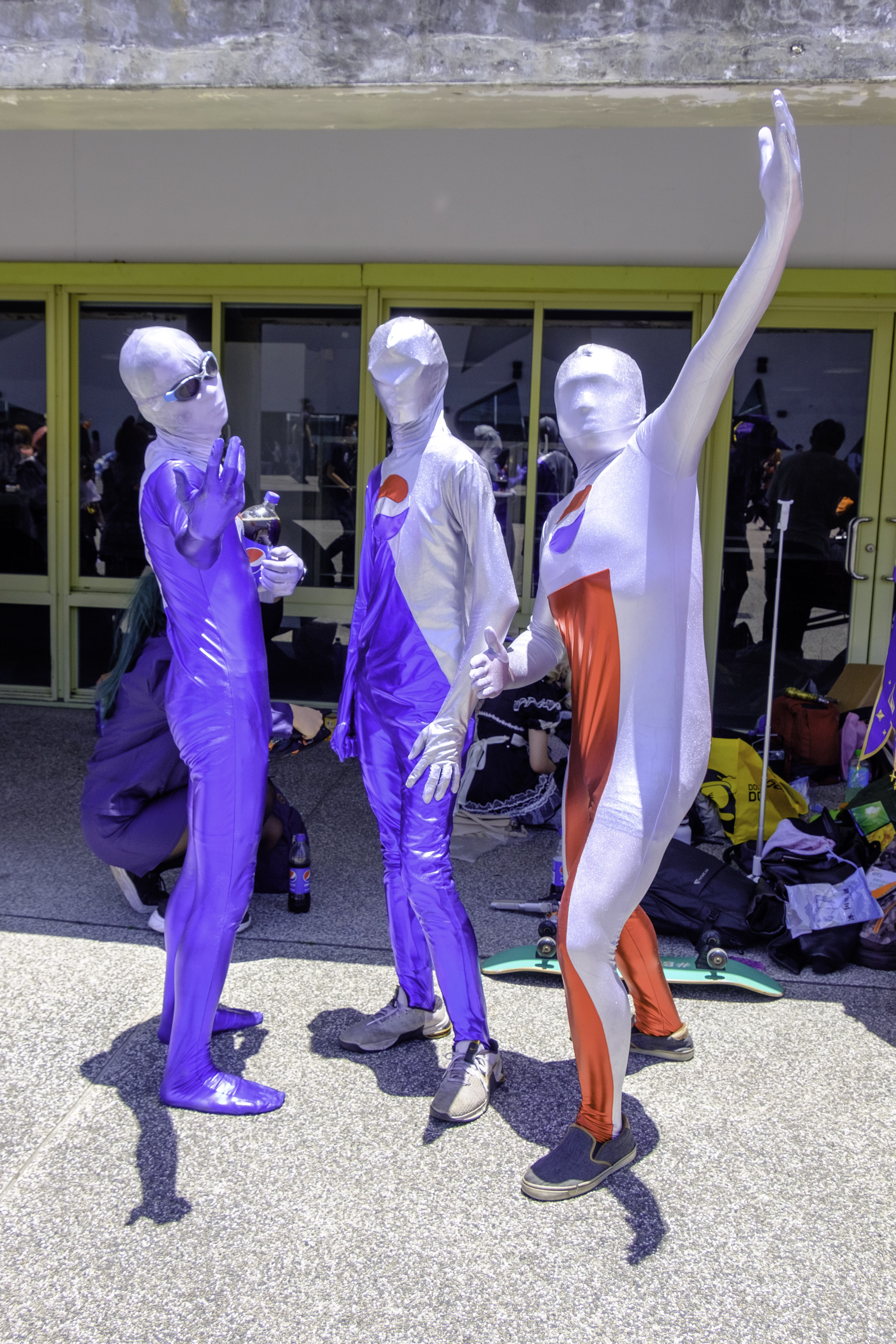
Cosplayers dressed as Pepsiman

Pepsiman is an official Pepsi mascot from Pepsi's Japanese corporate branch, which debuted in March 1996. Pepsiman took on three different outfits, each one representing the current style of the Pepsi can in distribution. Twelve commercials were created featuring the character. His role in the advertisements is to appear with Pepsi to thirsty people or people craving soda.

Pepsiman happens to appear at just the right time with the product. After delivering the beverage, sometimes Pepsiman would encounter a difficult and action-oriented situation which would result in injury. Pepsiman is mostly silent, and he has no face except for a hole that opens up whenever he delivers a Pepsi. Another more minor mascot, Pepsiwoman, also featured in a few of her own commercials for Pepsi Twist; her appearance is basically a female Pepsiman wearing a lemon-shaped balaclava.

In 1996, Sega-AM2 released the Sega Saturn version of its arcade fighting game Fighting Vipers. In this game, Pepsiman was included as a special character, with his specialty listed as being the ability to "quench one's thirst." He does not appear in any other version or sequel.

In 1999, KID developed a video game for the PlayStation entitled Pepsiman. As the titular character, the player runs "on rails" (forced motion on a scrolling linear path), skateboards, rolls, and stumbles through various areas, avoiding dangers and collecting cans of Pepsi, all while trying to reach a thirsty person as in the commercials. Despite largely being considered a financial failure, Pepsiman has developed a cult following due to its over the top and nonsensical premise.

== Sports sponsorships ==
Pepsi has official sponsorship deals with the National Football League, National Hockey League, and National Basketball Association. In 2007, and from 2013 to 2022, Pepsi sponsored the NFL's Super Bowl Halftime Shows. It was the sponsor of Major League Soccer until December 2015 and Major League Baseball until April 2017, both leagues signing deals with Coca-Cola. From 1999 to 2020, Pepsi also had the naming rights to the Pepsi Center, an indoor sports and entertainment facility in Denver, Colorado, until the venue's new naming rights were announced on October 22, 2020.

In 1997, after his sponsorship with Coca-Cola ended, retired NASCAR Cup Series driver Jeff Gordon signed a long-term contract with Pepsi, and he drove with the Pepsi logos on his car with various paint schemes for about 2 races each year, usually a darker paint scheme during nighttime races. Pepsi has remained as one of his sponsors ever since. Pepsi has also sponsored the NFL Rookie of the Year award since 2002.

Pepsi has the first global sponsorship deals with the UEFA Champions League and the UEFA Women's Champions League starting in the 2015–16 season along with the sister brand, Pepsi Max and became the global sponsor of the competition.

Pepsi also has sponsorship deals in international cricket teams. The Pakistani national cricket team is one of the teams that the brand sponsors. The team wears the Pepsi logo on the front of their test and ODI test match clothing.

The Buffalo Bisons, an American Hockey League team, was sponsored by Pepsi-Cola in its later years; the team adopted the beverage's red, white, and blue color scheme along with a modification of the Pepsi logo (with the word "Buffalo" in place of the Pepsi-Cola wordmark). The Bisons ceased operations in 1970, making way for the Buffalo Sabres of the NHL.

Pepsi also has been a sponsor of the Carolina Hurricanes of the National Hockey League since the team moved to North Carolina in 1997.

In 2017, Pepsi was the jersey sponsor of the Papua New Guinea national basketball team.

== See also ==
- List of Pepsi spokespersons
- Pepsi Max Big One (roller coaster)
- Pepsi Orange Streak (roller coaster)
- Pepsi Python (roller coaster)
- Mountain Dew
- Mountain Dew Amp
- Citrus Blast
