= The Root Glass Company =

American beverage bottle manufacturer

The Root Glass Company originated as Root Glass Works in Vigo County, Indiana. Businessman and Pennsylvania native Chapman J. Root (November 22, 1864 - November 20, 1945) opened the original glass company on May 27, 1901, at Third and Voorhees Streets a year after he moved to Terre Haute, Indiana. By 1904 the company was manufacturing beverage bottles for Coca-Cola as well as several other beverage companies in the area. Between 1905 and 1912 the Root Glass Company workforce increased from 600 to 825 employees.

== Information ==
In 1915, Root's company entered a Coca-Cola contest to design and exclusively manufacture a "new bottle, a distinctive package" for Coca-Cola. Chapman J. Root formed a design team for the contest consisting of plant supervisor Alexander Samuelson, auditor Clyde Edwards, and staff machinist and bottle designer Earl R. Dean. The now worldwide "Contour Bottle" icon was then patterned after the cocoa plant pod that was researched by Clyde Edwards and Earl Dean at the Emeline Fairbanks Memorial Library in Terre Haute. Once a sketch was made at the library by Earl Dean, he worked through the night adapting the sketch to a hand machined mold depicting the curved cocoa pod as the center portion of the newly designed sample Coca-Cola bottle. With limited time remaining before the molten glass furnaces would be shut down for cleaning, Dean produced a few sample bottles that would be submitted to the national Coca-Cola bottle contest.
