= Coca-Cola =

Cola soft drink

- Logo used since 1946

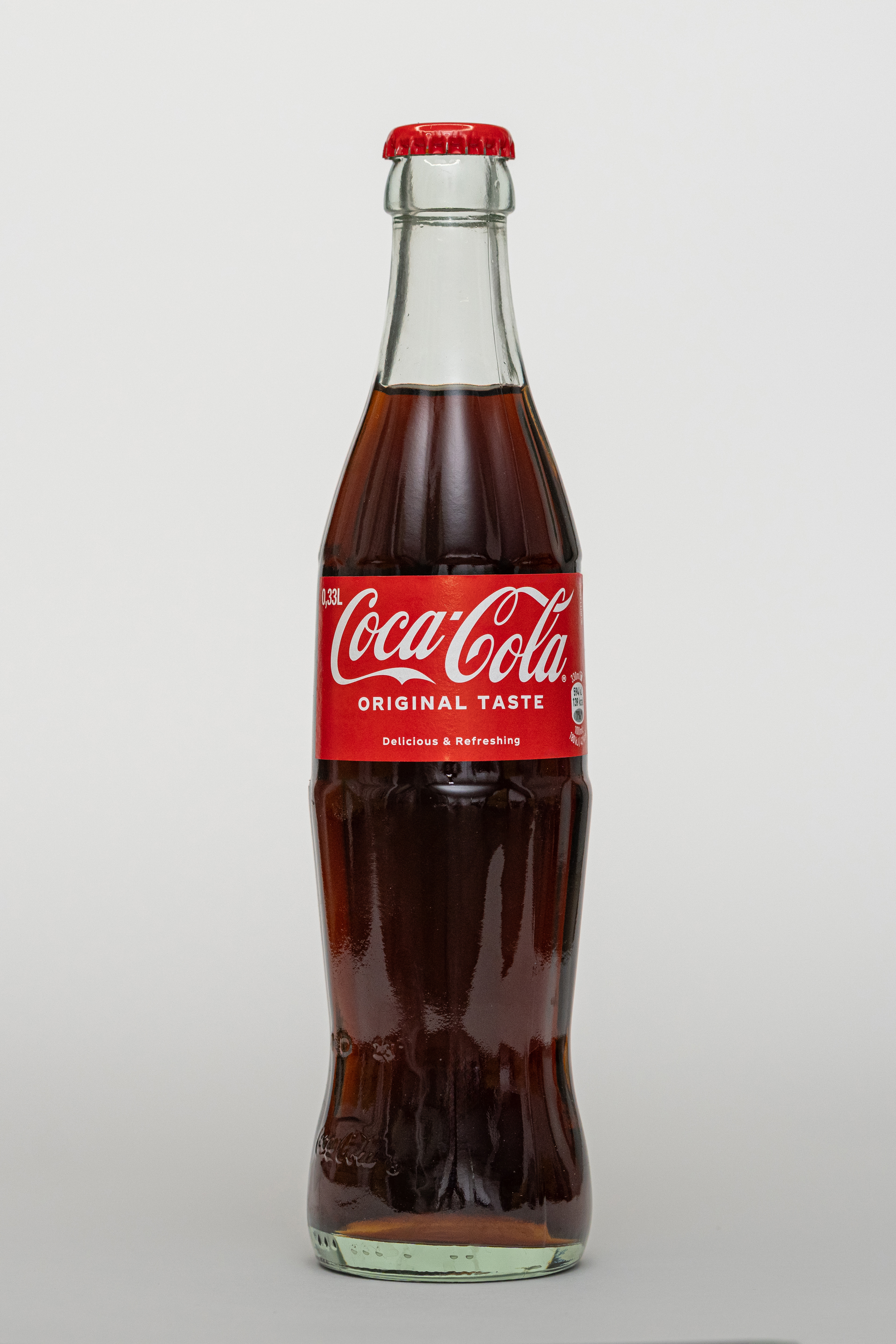
- Coca-Cola has retained many of its historical design features in modern glass bottles.
- Type: Cola
- Manufacturer: The Coca-Cola Company
- Distributor: Coca-Cola Europacific Partners - Australia Coca-Cola Consolidated - North America Swire Coca-Cola Reyes - North America Coca-Cola Bottling Coca-Cola - North America Cola Beverages Northeast - North America Coca-Cola FEMSA - Latin America Arca Continental - Latin America Coca-Cola Andina - Latin America Coca-Cola Beverages Africa - Africa Coca-Cola HBC - Asia and Europe Coca-Cola İçecek - Middle East and Central Asia
- Origin: United States, Atlanta, Georgia, U.S.
- Introduced: May 8, 1886; 140 years ago
- Color: Caramel E-150d
- Ingredients: carbonated water, high fructose corn syrup, sucrose, caramel colour, phosphoric acid, flavourings, caffeine
- Variants: Diet Coke; Diet Coke Caffeine-Free; Caffeine-Free Coca-Cola; Coca-Cola Zero Sugar; Coca-Cola Cherry; Coca-Cola Vanilla; Coca-Cola Cherry Vanilla; Coca-Cola Citra; Coca-Cola Lime; Coca-Cola Mango; Coca-Cola Spiced; Coca-Cola with Lemon; Diet Coke with Lemon
- Related products: Mojo; Pepsi; RC Cola; Afri-Cola; Postobón; Inca Kola; Kola Real; Cavan Cola; Est Cola
- Website: coca-cola.com

Coca-Cola, or Coke, is a cola soft drink manufactured by the Coca-Cola Company. In 2013, Coke products were sold in over 200 countries and territories worldwide, with consumers drinking more than 1.8 billion company beverage servings each day. Coca-Cola ranked No. 94 in the 2024 Fortune 500 list of the largest United States corporations by revenue. Based on Interbrand's "best global brand" study of 2023, Coca-Cola was the world's sixth most valuable brand.

Originally marketed as a temperance drink and intended as a patent medicine, Coca-Cola was invented in the late 19th century by John Stith Pemberton in Atlanta. In 1888, Pemberton sold the ownership rights to Asa Griggs Candler, a businessman, whose marketing tactics led Coca-Cola to its dominance of the global soft-drink market throughout the 20th and 21st centuries. The name refers to two of its original ingredients: coca leaves and kola nuts (a source of caffeine). The formula of Coca-Cola remains a trade secret; however, a variety of reported recipes and experimental recreations have been published. The secrecy around the formula has been used by Coca-Cola as a marketing aid because only a handful of anonymous employees know the formula. The drink has inspired imitators and created a whole classification of soft drink: colas.

The Coca-Cola Company produces concentrate, which is then sold to licensed Coca-Cola bottlers throughout the world. The bottlers, who hold exclusive territory contracts with the company, produce the finished product in cans and bottles from the concentrate, in combination with filtered water and sweeteners. A typical 12 fl oz (355 mL) can contains 38 grams (1.3 oz) of sugar (usually in the form of high-fructose corn syrup in North America). The bottlers then sell, distribute, and merchandise Coca-Cola to retail stores, restaurants, and vending machines throughout the world. The Coca-Cola Company also sells concentrate for soda fountains of major restaurants and foodservice distributors.

The Coca-Cola Company has, on occasion, introduced other cola drinks under the Coke name. The most common of these is Diet Coke, along with others including Caffeine-Free Coca-Cola, Diet Coke Caffeine-Free, Coca-Cola Zero Sugar, Coca-Cola Cherry, Coca-Cola Vanilla, and special versions with lemon, lime, and coffee. Coca-Cola was called Coca-Cola Classic from July 1985 to 2009, to distinguish it from "New Coke".

== History ==
=== 19th century ===
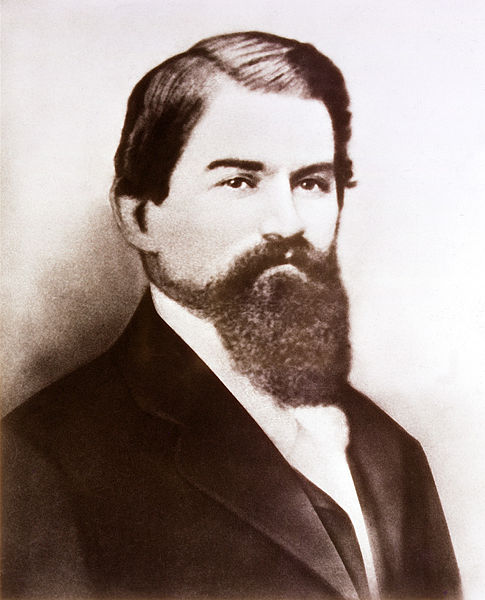
John Stith Pemberton, the original creator of Coca-Cola

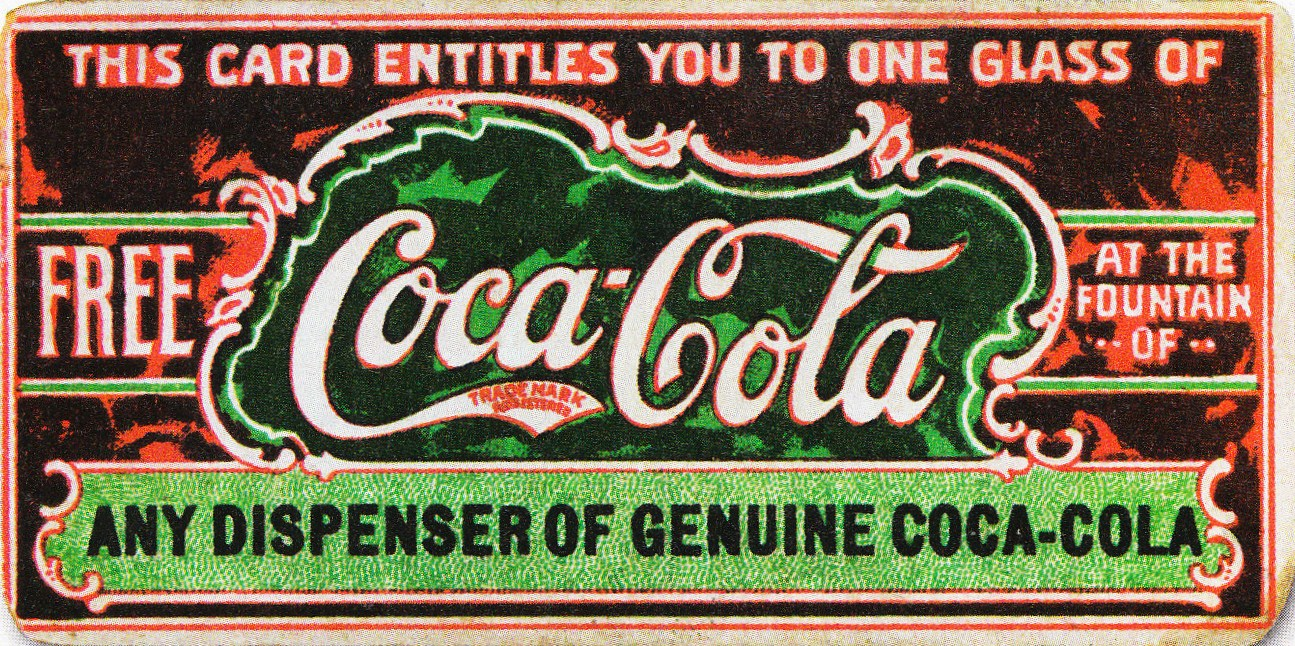
Believed to be the first coupon ever, this ticket for a free glass of Coca-Cola was first distributed in 1888 to help promote the drink. By 1913, the company had redeemed 8.5 million tickets.

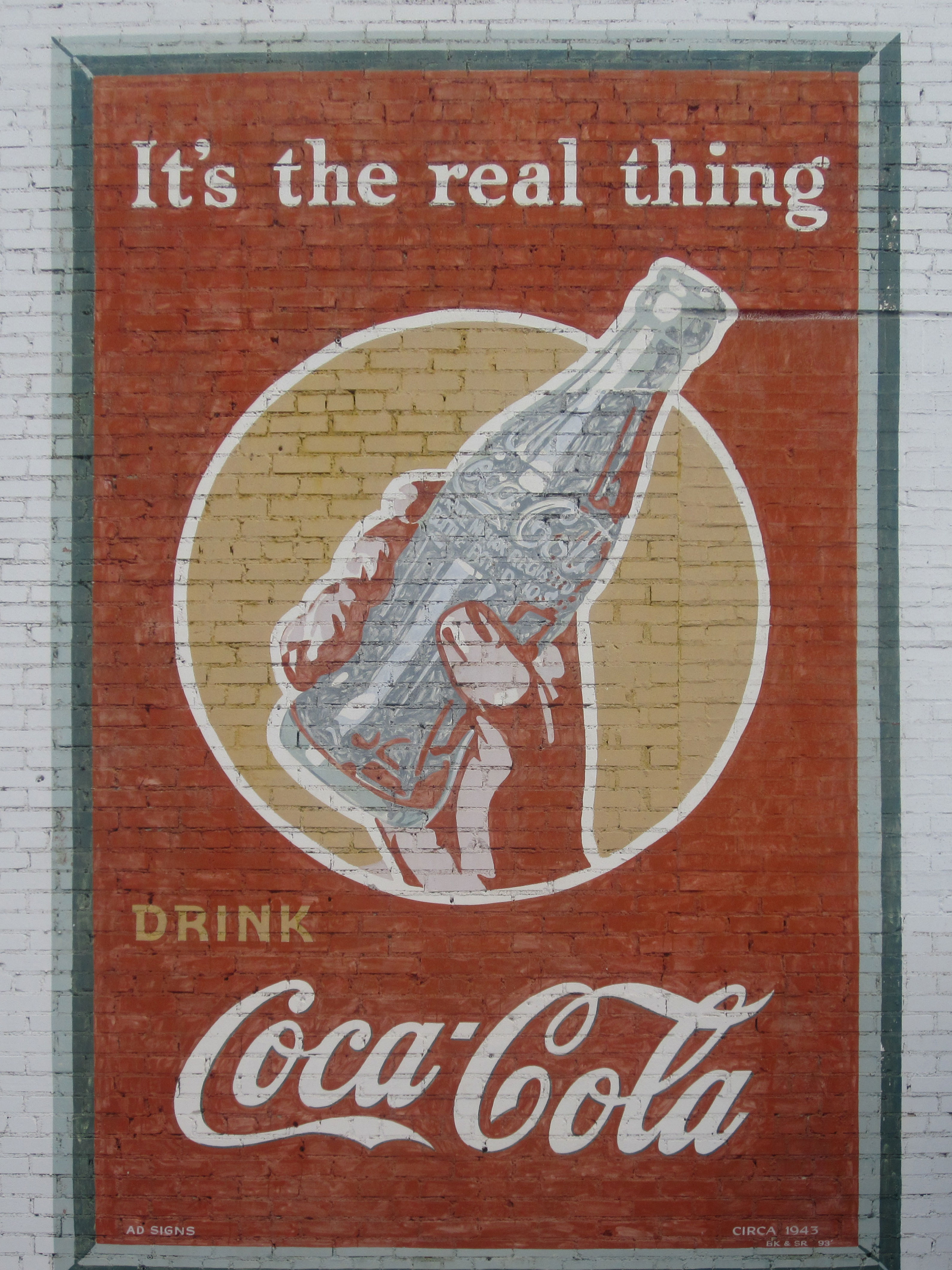
This refurbished Coca-Cola advertisement from 1943 is still displayed in Minden, Louisiana.

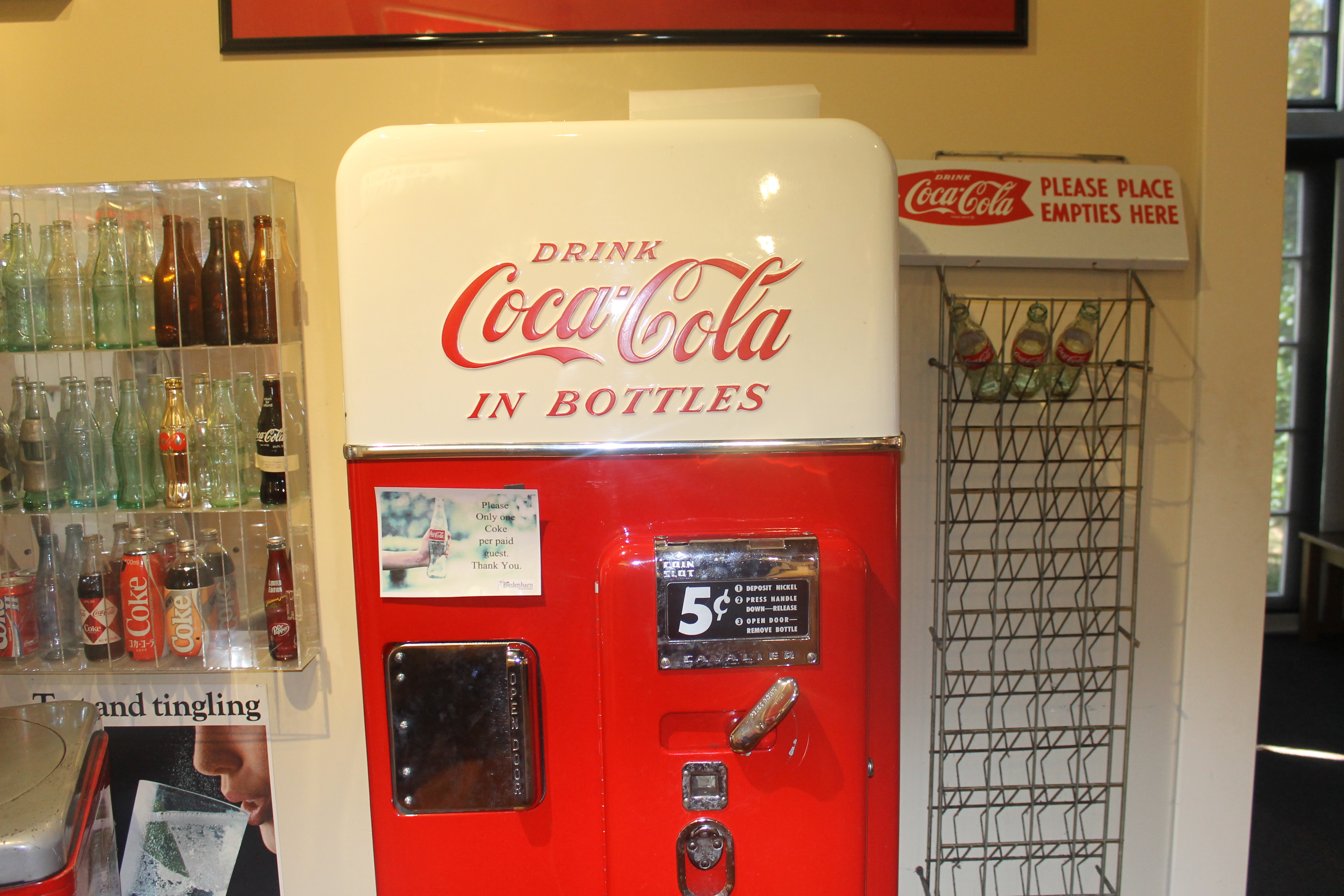
Early Coca-Cola vending machine at Biedenharn Museum and Gardens in Monroe, Louisiana

==== Origins ====
Confederate Colonel John Pemberton, wounded in the American Civil War and addicted to morphine, also had a medical degree and began a quest to find a substitute for the problematic drug. In 1885 at Pemberton's Eagle Drug and Chemical House, his drugstore in Columbus, Georgia, he registered Pemberton's French Wine Coca nerve tonic. Pemberton's tonic may have been inspired by the formidable success of Vin Mariani, a French-Corsican coca wine, but his recipe additionally included the African kola nut, the beverage's source of caffeine. A Spanish drink called "Kola Coca" was presented at a contest in Philadelphia in 1885, a year before the official birth of Coca-Cola. The rights for this Spanish drink were bought by Coca-Cola in 1953.

In 1886, when Atlanta and Fulton County passed prohibition legislation, Pemberton responded by developing Coca-Cola, a non-alcoholic version of Pemberton's French Wine Coca. It was marketed as "Coca-Cola: The temperance drink", which appealed to many people as the temperance movement enjoyed wide support during this time. The first sales were at Jacob's Pharmacy in Atlanta, Georgia, on May 8, 1886, where it initially sold for five cents a glass. Drugstore soda fountains were popular in the United States at the time due to the belief that carbonated water was good for the health, and Pemberton's new drink was marketed and sold as a patent medicine, Pemberton claiming it a cure for many diseases, including morphine addiction, indigestion, nerve disorders, headaches, and impotence. Pemberton ran the first advertisement for the beverage on May 29 of the same year in the Atlanta Journal.

Meanwhile, Asa Candler, an Atlanta pharmacist, opened syrup factories throughout the country: Dallas (1894), Chicago and Los Angeles (1895), Philadelphia (1897), and New York (1899).

By 1888, three versions of Coca-Cola – sold by three separate businesses – were on the market. A co-partnership had been formed on January 14, 1888, between Pemberton and four Atlanta businessmen: J.C. Mayfield, A.O. Murphey, C.O. Mullahy, and E.H. Bloodworth. Not codified by any signed document, a verbal statement given by Candler years later asserted under testimony that he had acquired a stake in Pemberton's company as early as 1887. John Pemberton declared that the name "Coca-Cola" belonged to his son, Charley, but the other two manufacturers could continue to use the formula.

Charley Pemberton's record of control over the "Coca-Cola" name was the underlying factor that allowed for him to participate as a major shareholder in the March 1888 Coca-Cola Company incorporation filing made in his father's place. Charley's exclusive control over the "Coca-Cola" name became a continual thorn in Asa Candler's side. Candler's oldest son, Charles Howard Candler, authored a book in 1950 published by Emory University. In this definitive biography about his father, Candler specifically states: "on April 14, 1888, the young druggist Asa Griggs Candler purchased a one-third interest in the formula of an almost completely unknown proprietary elixir known as Coca-Cola." The deal was actually between John Pemberton's son Charley and Walker, Candler & Co. – with John Pemberton acting as cosigner for his son. For $50 down and $500 in 30 days, Walker, Candler & Co. obtained all of the one-third interest in the Coca-Cola Company that Charley held, all while Charley still held on to the name. After the April 14 deal, on April 17, 1888, one-half of the Walker/Dozier interest shares were acquired by Candler for an additional $750.

==== Company ====
After Candler had gained a better foothold on Coca-Cola in April 1888, he nevertheless was forced to sell the beverage he produced with the recipe he had under the names "Yum Yum" and "Koke". This was while Charley Pemberton was selling the elixir, although a cruder mixture, under the name "Coca-Cola", all with his father's blessing. After both names failed to catch on for Candler, by the middle of 1888, the Atlanta pharmacist was quite anxious to establish a firmer legal claim to Coca-Cola, and hoped he could force his two competitors, Walker and Dozier, completely out of the business, as well.

John Pemberton died of stomach cancer on August 16, 1888. Asa Candler then decided to move swiftly forward to attain full control of the entire Coca-Cola operation.

Charley Pemberton, an alcoholic and opium addict, unnerved Asa Candler more than anyone else. Candler is said to have quickly maneuvered to purchase the exclusive rights to the name "Coca-Cola" from Pemberton's son Charley immediately after he learned of Pemberton's death. One of several stories states that Candler approached Charley's mother at John Pemberton's funeral and offered her $300 in cash for the rights to the name.

In Charles Howard Candler's 1950 book about his father, he stated: "On August 30 [1888], he [Asa Candler] became the sole proprietor of Coca-Cola, a fact which was stated on letterheads, invoice blanks and advertising copy."

With this action on August 30, 1888, Candler's sole control became technically all true. Candler had negotiated with Margaret Dozier and her brother Woolfolk Walker a full payment amounting to $1,000, which all agreed Candler could pay off with a series of notes over a specified time span. By May 1, 1889, Candler was claiming full ownership of the Coca-Cola beverage, with a total investment outlay by Candler for the drink enterprise over the years amounting to $2,300.

In 1914, Margaret Dozier, as co-owner of the original Coca-Cola Company in 1888, came forward to claim that her signature on the 1888 Coca-Cola Company bill of sale had been forged. Subsequent analysis of other similar transfer documents had also indicated John Pemberton's signature had most likely been forged as well, which some accounts claim was precipitated by his son Charley.

In 1892, Candler set out to incorporate a second company, the Coca-Cola Company (the modern corporation). When Candler had the earliest records of the "Coca-Cola Company" destroyed in 1910, the action was claimed to have been made during a move to new corporation offices around this time.

On June 23, 1894, Charley Pemberton was found unconscious with a stick of opium by his side. Ten days later, he died at Atlanta's Grady Hospital at the age of 40.

On September 12, 1919, Coca-Cola Co. was purchased by a group of investors led by Ernest Woodruff's Trust Company for $25 million and reincorporated under the Delaware General Corporation Law. The company publicly offered 500,000 shares of the company for $40 a share. In 1923, his son Robert W. Woodruff was elected President of the company. Woodruff expanded the company and brought Coca-Cola to the rest of the world. Coca-Cola began distributing bottles as "six-packs", encouraging customers to purchase the beverage for their home.

During its first several decades, Coca-Cola officially wanted to be known by its full-name despite being commonly known as "Coke". This was due to company fears that the term coke would eventually become a generic trademark, which to an extent became true in the Southern United States where "coke" is used even for non Coca-Cola products. The company also did not want to confuse its drink with the similarly-named coal byproduct that clearly was not safe to consume. Fearing another company might claim the trademark, Coca-Cola officially adopted "Coke" in 1941 and registered it in 1945.

In 1986, the Coca-Cola Company merged with two of their bottling operators (owned by JTL Corporation and BCI Holding Corporation) to form Coca-Cola Enterprises Inc. (CCE).

In December 1991, Coca-Cola Enterprises merged with the Johnston Coca-Cola Bottling Group, Inc.

==== Bottling ====
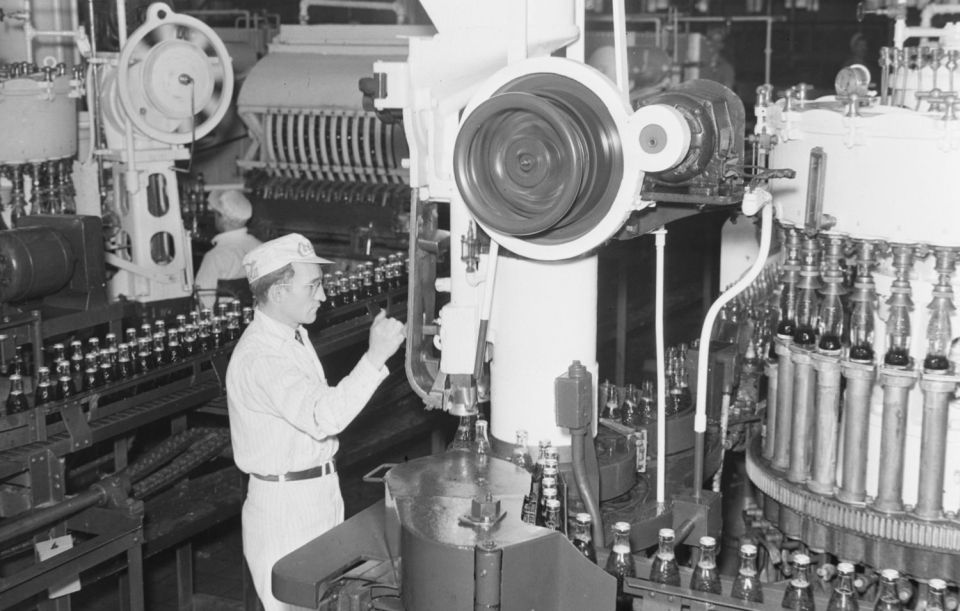
Bottling plant of Coca-Cola Canada Ltd., January 8, 1941, Montreal, Canada

The first bottling of Coca-Cola occurred in Vicksburg, Mississippi, at the Biedenharn Candy Company on March 12, 1894. The proprietor of the bottling works was Joseph A. Biedenharn. The original bottles were Hutchinson bottles, very different from the much later hobble-skirt design of 1915 now so familiar.

A few years later two entrepreneurs from Chattanooga, Tennessee, namely Benjamin F. Thomas and Joseph B. Whitehead, proposed the idea of bottling and were so persuasive that Candler signed a contract giving them control of the procedure for only one dollar. Candler later realized that he had made a grave mistake. Candler never collected his dollar, but in 1899, Chattanooga became the site of the first Coca-Cola bottling company. Candler remained very content just selling his company's syrup. The loosely termed contract proved to be problematic for the Coca-Cola Company for decades to come. Legal matters were not helped by the decision of the bottlers to subcontract to other companies, effectively becoming parent bottlers. This contract specified that bottles would be sold at 5¢ each and had no fixed duration, leading to the fixed price of Coca-Cola from 1886 to 1959.

=== 20th century ===
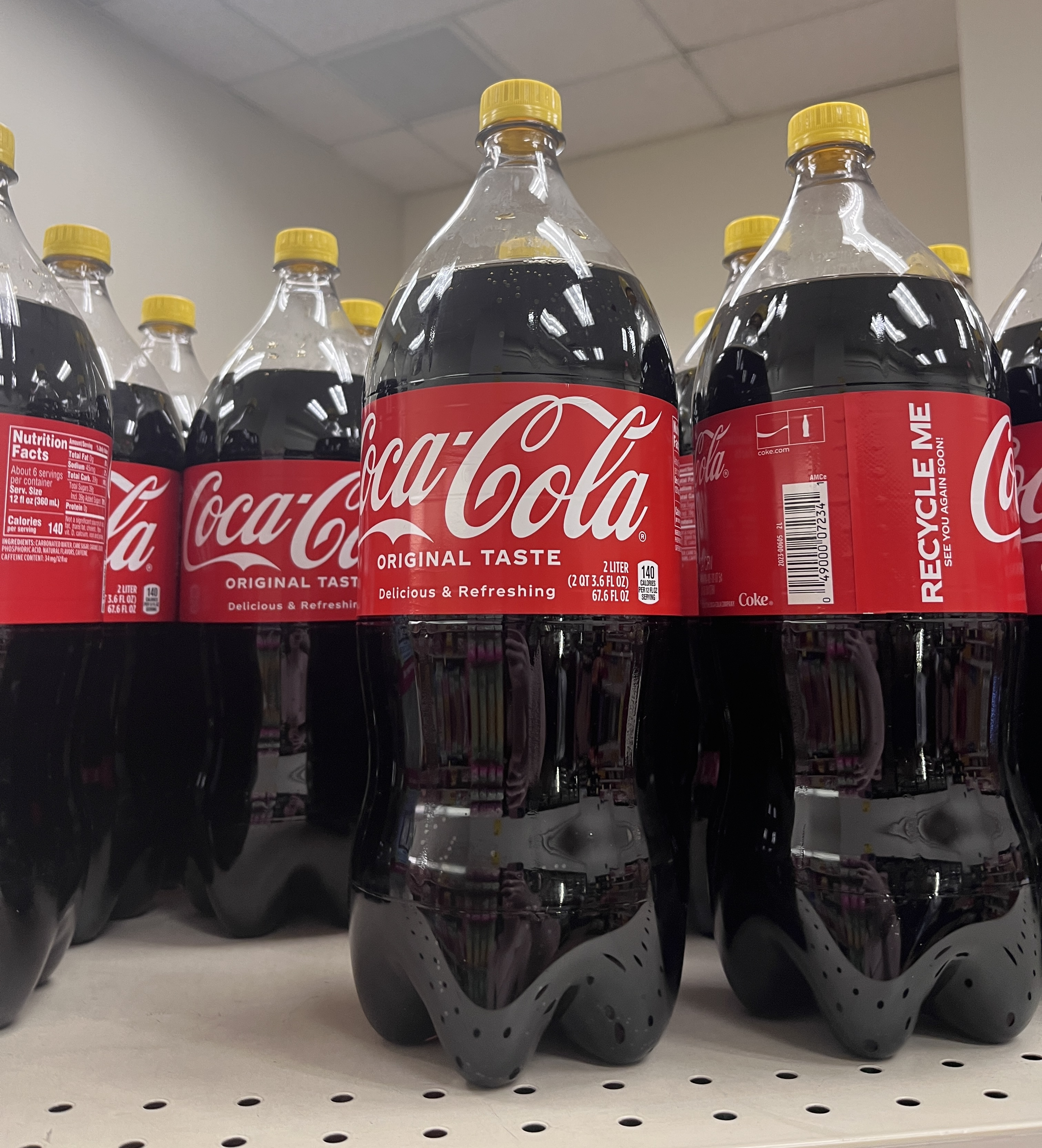
Bottles of Coke with yellow caps, indicating they are kosher for Passover.

The first outdoor wall advertisement that promoted the Coca-Cola drink was painted in 1894 in Cartersville, Georgia. Cola syrup was sold as an over-the-counter dietary supplement for upset stomach. By the time of its 50th anniversary, the soft drink had reached the status of a national icon in the US. In 1935, it was certified kosher by Atlanta rabbi Tobias Geffen. With the help of Harold Hirsch, Geffen was the first person outside the company to see the top-secret ingredients list after Coke faced scrutiny from the American Jewish population regarding the drink's kosher status. Consequently, the company made minor changes in the sourcing of some ingredients so it could continue to be consumed by America's Jewish population, including during Passover. A yellow cap on a Coca-Cola drink indicates that it is kosher for Passover.

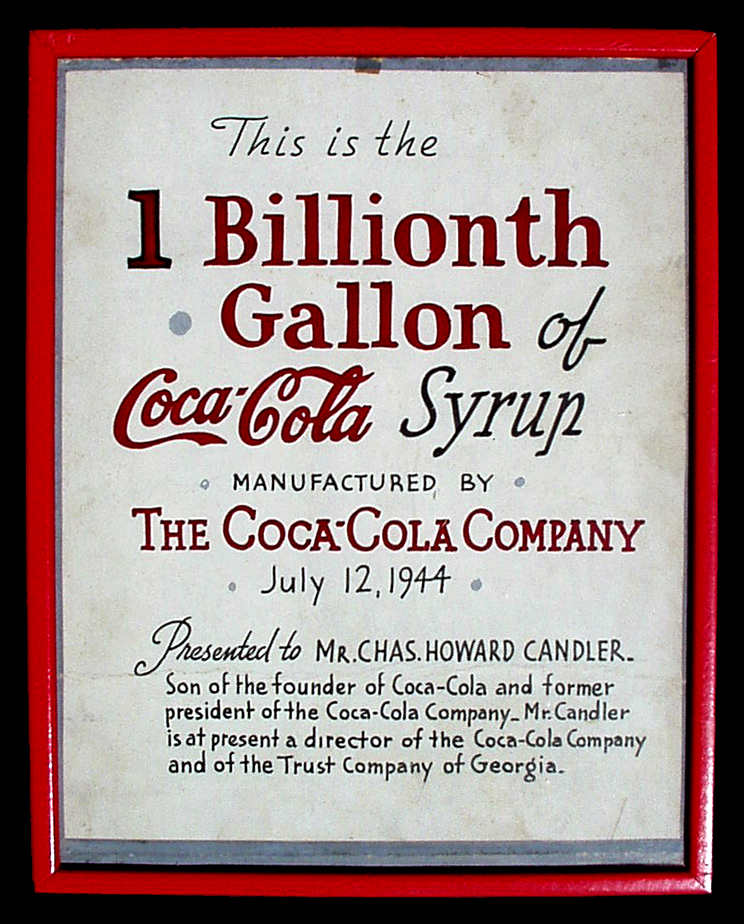
Original framed Coca-Cola artist's drawn graphic presented by the Coca-Cola Company on July 12, 1944, to Charles Howard Candler on the occasion of Coca-Cola's "1 Billionth Gallon of Coca-Cola Syrup"

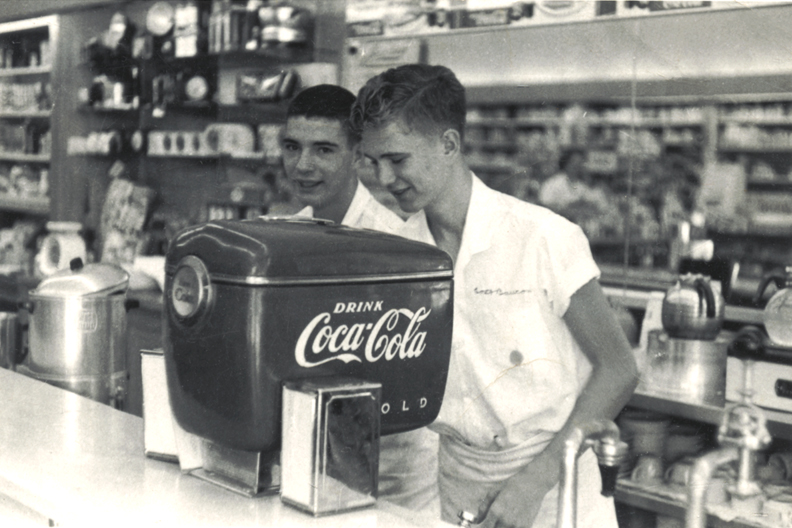
Claimed to be the first installation anywhere of the 1948 model "Boat Motor" styled Coca-Cola soda dispenser, Fleeman's Pharmacy, Atlanta, Georgia. The "Boat Motor" soda dispenser was introduced in the late 1930s and manufactured until the late 1950s. Photograph c. 1948

The longest running commercial Coca-Cola soda fountain anywhere was Atlanta's Fleeman's Pharmacy, which first opened its doors in 1914. Jack Fleeman took over the pharmacy from his father and ran it until 1995; closing it after 81 years. On July 12, 1944, the one-billionth gallon of Coca-Cola syrup was manufactured by the Coca-Cola Company. Cans of Coke first appeared in 1955.

==== New Coke ====
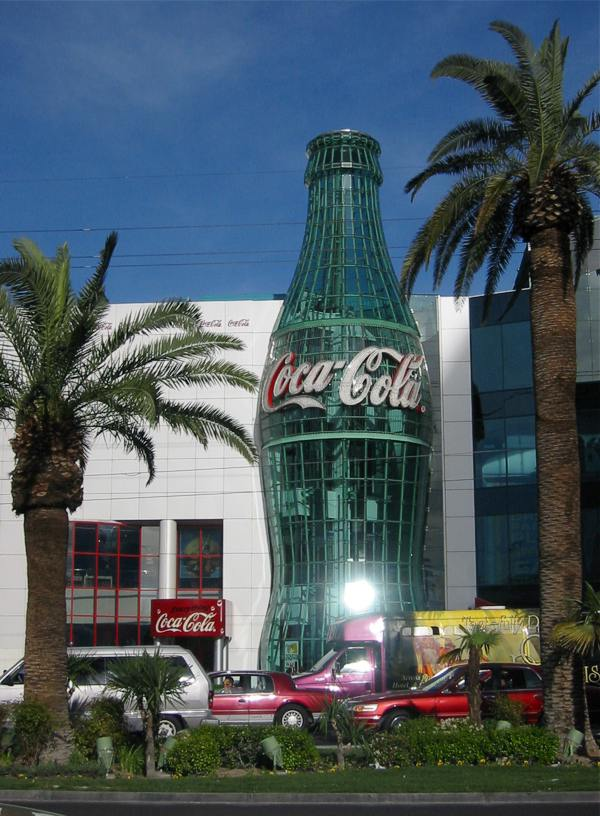
The Las Vegas Strip World of Coca-Cola museum in 2003

On April 23, 1985, Coca-Cola, amid much publicity, changed the formula of the drink with "New Coke". Follow-up taste tests revealed most consumers preferred the taste of New Coke to both old Coke and Pepsi but Coca-Cola management was unprepared for the public's nostalgia for the old drink, leading to a backlash. The company gave in to protests and returned to the old formula under the name Coca-Cola Classic, on July 10, 1985. "New Coke" remained available and was renamed Coke II in 1992; it was discontinued in 2002.

=== 21st century ===
On July 5, 2005, it was revealed that Coca-Cola would resume operations in Iraq for the first time since the Arab League boycotted the company in 1968.

In April 2007, in Canada, the name "Coca-Cola Classic" was changed back to "Coca-Cola". The word "Classic" was removed because "New Coke" was no longer in production, eliminating the need to differentiate between the two. The formula remained unchanged. In January 2009, Coca-Cola stopped printing the word "Classic" on the labels of 16-US-fluid-ounce (470 ml) bottles sold in parts of the southeastern United States. The change was part of a larger strategy to rejuvenate the product's image. The word "Classic" was removed from all Coca-Cola products by 2011.

In November 2009, due to a dispute over wholesale prices of Coca-Cola products, Costco stopped restocking its shelves with Coke and Diet Coke for two months; a separate pouring rights deal in 2013 saw Coke products removed from Costco food courts in favor of Pepsi. It eventually returned to Costco food courts in mid-2025. Some Costco locations (such as the ones in Tucson, Arizona) additionally sell imported Coca-Cola from Mexico, with cane sugar instead of corn syrup, from separate distributors. Coca-Cola introduced the 7.5-ounce mini-can in 2009, and on September 22, 2011, the company announced price reductions, asking retailers to sell eight-packs for $2.99. That same day, Coca-Cola announced the 12.5-ounce bottle, to sell for 89 cents. A 16-ounce bottle has sold well at 99 cents since being re-introduced, but the price was going up to $1.19.

In 2012, Coca-Cola resumed business in Myanmar after 60 years of absence due to US-imposed investment sanctions against the country. Coca-Cola's bottling plant is located in Yangon and was part of the company's five-year plan and $200 million investment in Myanmar. Coca-Cola with its partners were to invest US$5 billion in its operations in India by 2020.

In February 2021, as a plan to combat plastic waste, Coca-Cola said that it would start selling its sodas in bottles made from 100% recycled plastic material in the United States, and by 2030, it planned to recycle one bottle or can for each one it sold. Coca-Cola started by selling 2000 paper bottles to see if they held up due to the risk of safety and of changing the taste of the drink.

In October 2025, the company announced plans to introduce single-serving 7.5 US fl oz (220 mL) mini-cans of its beverage lines to convenience stores for the first time. Previously available only in multi-packs sold at North American grocery stores, the mini-cans have gained significant popularity, accounting for approximately 9% of the sparkling soft drink market share in large retail stores. The decision to expand distribution to convenience stores aligns with evolving consumer preferences, including increased demand for smaller portion sizes, influenced by trends such as the use of GLP-1 receptor agonists for weight management, growing interest in snacking, and economic factors like shrinkflation.

== Production ==
=== Listed ingredients ===
- Carbonated water
- Sugar (sucrose or high-fructose corn syrup (HFCS) depending on country of origin)
- Caffeine
- Phosphoric acid
- Caramel color (E150d)
- Natural flavorings

A typical can of Coca-Cola (12 fl ounces/355 ml) contains 39 grams of sugar, 34 mg of caffeine, 45 mg of sodium, no fat, no potassium, and 140 calories.

=== Formula of natural flavorings ===
The exact formula for Coca-Cola's natural flavorings is a trade secret. (All of its other ingredients are listed on the side of the bottle or can, and are not secret.) The original copy of the formula was held in Truist Financial's main vault in Atlanta for 86 years. Its predecessor, the Trust Company, was the underwriter for the Coca-Cola Company's initial public offering in 1919. On December 8, 2011, the original secret formula was moved from the vault at SunTrust Banks into a new vault; this vault will be on display for visitors to its World of Coca-Cola museum in downtown Atlanta.

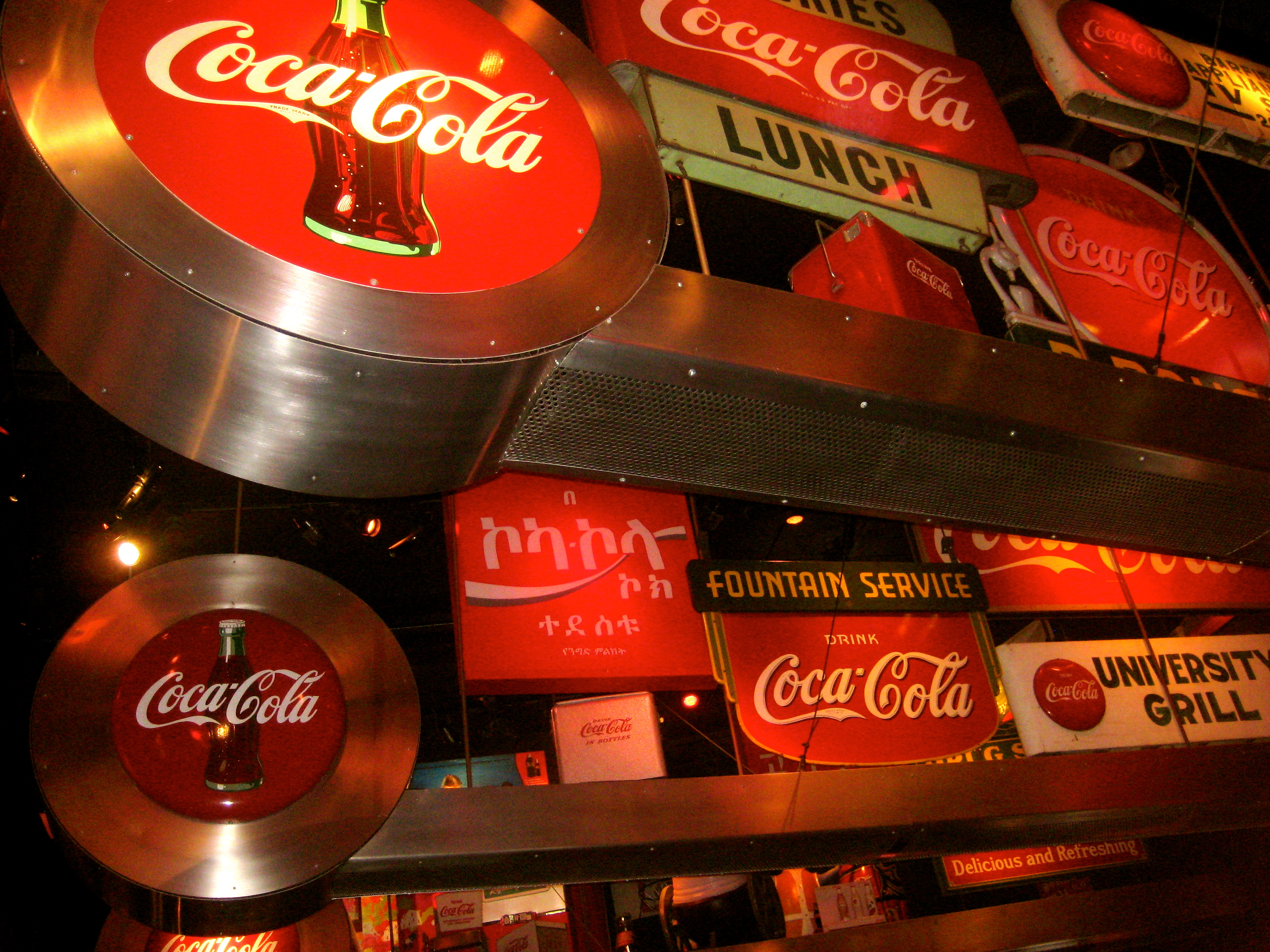
World of Coca-Cola museum in Atlanta, Georgia

According to Snopes, a popular myth states that only two executives have access to the formula, with each executive having only half the formula. However, several sources state that while Coca-Cola does have a rule restricting access to only two executives, each of them knows the entire formula, and that persons other than the prescribed duo have known the formulation process.

On February 11, 2011, Ira Glass said on his PRI radio show, This American Life, that his staffers had found a recipe in "Everett Beal's Recipe Book", reproduced in the February 28, 1979 issue of The Atlanta Journal-Constitution, that they believed was either Pemberton's original formula for Coca-Cola or a version that he made either before or after the product hit the market in 1886. The formula basically matched the one found in Pemberton's diary. Coca-Cola archivist Phil Mooney acknowledged that the recipe "could be a precursor" to the formula used in the original 1886 product, but emphasized that Pemberton's original formula is not the same as the one used in the modern product.

Joya Williams, a secretary to the global brand director at Coca-Cola's Atlanta headquarters, stole the formula. Williams, along with her accomplices Ibrahim Dimson and Edmund Duhaney, conspired to sell the confidential trade secret to Pepsi for US$1.5 million. However, Pepsi did not capitalize on the opportunity and instead reported the illegal offer to Coca-Cola and the FBI. The FBI setup a sting operation posing as Pepsi executives, leading to the arrest of Williams and her accomplices. Public prosecutor David Nahmias praised Pepsi for doing the right thing: "They did so because trade secrets are important to everybody in the business community. They realise that if their trade secrets are violated, they all suffer, the market suffers and the community suffers."

=== Use of stimulants in formula ===
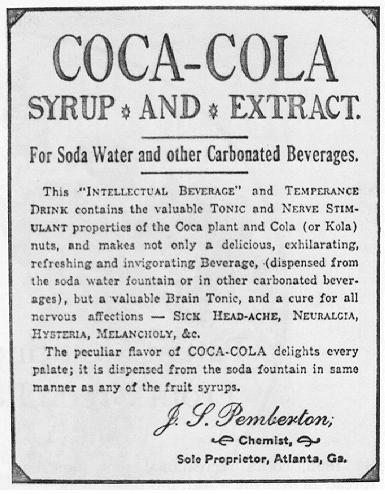
An early Coca-Cola advertisement

When launched, Coca-Cola's two key ingredients were cocaine and caffeine. The cocaine was derived from the coca leaf and the caffeine from kola nut (also spelled "cola nut" at the time), leading to the name Coca-Cola.

==== Coca leaf ====
Pemberton called for five ounces of coca leaf per gallon of syrup (approximately 37 g/L), a significant dose; in 1891, Candler claimed his formula (altered extensively from Pemberton's original) contained only a tenth of this amount. Coca-Cola once contained an estimated nine milligrams of cocaine per glass. (For comparison, a typical dose or "line" of cocaine is 50–75 mg.) In 1903, the fresh coca leaves were removed from the formula.

After 1904, instead of using fresh leaves, Coca-Cola started using "spent" leaves – the leftovers of the cocaine-extraction process with trace levels of cocaine. Since then (by 1929), Coca-Cola has used a cocaine-free coca leaf extract. Today, that extract is prepared at a Stepan Company plant in Maywood, New Jersey, the only manufacturing plant authorized by the federal government to import and process coca leaves, which it obtains from Peru and Bolivia. Stepan Company extracts cocaine from the coca leaves, which it then sells to Mallinckrodt, the only company in the United States licensed to purify cocaine for medicinal use.

Long after the syrup had ceased to contain any significant amount of cocaine, in North Carolina "dope" remained a common colloquialism for Coca-Cola, and "dope-wagons" were trucks that transported it.

==== Kola nuts for caffeine ====
The kola nut acts as a flavoring and the original source of caffeine in Coca-Cola. It contains about 2.0 to 3.5% caffeine, and has a bitter flavor.

In 1911, the US government sued in United States v. Forty Barrels and Twenty Kegs of Coca-Cola, hoping to force the Coca-Cola Company to remove caffeine from its formula. The court found that the syrup, when diluted as directed, would result in a beverage containing 1.21 grains (or 78.4 mg) of caffeine per 8 US fluid ounces (240 ml) serving. The case was decided in favor of the Coca-Cola Company at the district court, but subsequently in 1912, the US Pure Food and Drug Act was amended, adding caffeine to the list of "habit-forming" and "deleterious" substances which must be listed on a product's label. In 1913 the case was appealed to the Sixth Circuit in Cincinnati, where the ruling was affirmed, but then appealed again in 1916 to the Supreme Court, where the government effectively won as a new trial was ordered. The company then voluntarily reduced the amount of caffeine in its product, and offered to pay the government's legal costs to settle and avoid further litigation.

Coca-Cola contains 34 mg of caffeine per 12 US fluid ounces (or 22.7 mg per 8 US fluid ounces (240 ml) serving).

=== Franchised production model ===
The production and distribution of Coca-Cola follows a franchising model. The Coca-Cola Company only produces a syrup concentrate, which it sells to bottlers throughout the world, who hold Coca-Cola franchises for one or more geographical areas. The bottlers produce the final drink by mixing the syrup with filtered water and sweeteners, putting the mixture into cans and bottles, and carbonating it, which the bottlers then sell and distribute to retail stores, vending machines, restaurants, and foodservice distributors.

The Coca-Cola Company owns minority shares in some of its largest franchises, such as Coca-Cola Hellenic Bottling Company, and Coca-Cola FEMSA, as well as some smaller ones, such as Coca-Cola Bottlers Uzbekistan, but fully independent bottlers produce almost half of the volume sold in the world. Independent bottlers are allowed to sweeten the drink according to local tastes.

== Geographic spread ==
Coca-Cola has been sold outside the United States since as early as the turn of the 20th century, as the drink was first sold in Britain on 31 August 1900 and the Cuba Libre (a mix between Coca-Cola and rum) was created in Havana shortly after the Spanish–American War of 1898. However, the international reach of the product became mostly limited to North and Central America, the Caribbean, Western Europe and parts of Asia until the 1940s, when the brand was introduced throughout South America and then Europe after the end of World War II (Fanta was initially conceived by the German Coca-Cola subsidiary as an emergency replacement as the wartime trade embargo prevented the import of syrup). As a result, Coca-Cola eventually became regarded as one of the major symbols of American soft power as well as of globalization.

Since it announced its intention to begin distribution in Myanmar in June 2012, Coca-Cola has been officially available in every country in the world except Cuba (where it stopped being available officially since 1960—ironically, Coca-Cola's first bottling plant outside the United States was established there in 1906) and North Korea. However, it is reported to be available in both countries as a gray import. Coca-Cola suspended its operations in Russia after the 2022 Russian invasion of Ukraine.

Coca-Cola has been a point of legal discussion in the Middle East. In the early 20th century, a fatwa was created in Egypt to discuss the question of "whether Muslims were permitted to drink Coca-Cola and Pepsi cola." The fatwa states: "According to the Muslim Hanefite, Shafi'ite, etc., the rule in Islamic law of forbidding or allowing foods and beverages is based on the presumption that such things are permitted unless it can be shown that they are forbidden on the basis of the Qur'an." The Muslim jurists stated that, unless the Qur'an specifically prohibits the consumption of a particular product, it is permissible to consume. Another clause was discussed, whereby the same rules apply if a person is unaware of the condition or ingredients of the item in question.

Coca-Cola first entered the Chinese market in the 1920s with no localized representation of its name. While the company researched a satisfactory translation, local shopkeepers created their own. These produced the desired "ko-ka ko-la" sound, but with odd meanings such as "female horse fastened with wax" or "bite the wax tadpole". In the 1930s, the company settled on the name "可口可樂（可口可乐）" (Kěkǒu kělè) taking into account the effects of syllable and meaning translations. The phrase means roughly "to allow the mouth to be able to rejoice". The story introduction from Coca-Cola mentions that Chiang Yee provided the new localized name, but there are also sources that the localized name appeared before 1935, or that it was given by someone named Jerome T. Lieu who studied at Columbia University in New York. Coca-Cola's first Taiwanese factory was built in 1957. At the time, a prohibition on the drink was in place and The Coca-Cola Company was permitted to sell only to people working for American agencies, such as the United States Armed Forces. The ban was formally lifted in 1966, and Coca-Cola became legally and readily available to Taiwanese consumers in 1968.

== Brand portfolio ==
Shortened "Coke" logo used on the back of cans and included in the logos of some flavor variations

This is a list of variants of Coca-Cola introduced around the world. In addition to the caffeine-free version of the original, additional fruit flavors have been included over the years. Not included here are versions of Diet Coke and Coca-Cola Zero Sugar; these variant versions of those no-calorie colas can be found in their respective articles.

Name	Launched	Notes
Diet Coke	1982	A low-calorie version of Coca-Cola with sweeteners instead of sugar or corn syrup.
Caffeine-Free Coca-Cola	1983	A variant of the standard Coca-Cola without caffeine.
Coca-Cola Cherry	1985	Coca-Cola with a cherry flavor. It was originally marketed as Cherry Coke (Cherry Coca-Cola), and was named as such in North America until 2006.
New Coke / Coca-Cola II	1985	An unpopular formula change, remained after the original formula quickly returned and was later rebranded as Coca-Cola II until its full discontinuation in 2002. In 2019, New Coke was re-introduced to the market to promote the third season of the Netflix original series, Stranger Things.
Golden Coca-Cola	2001	A limited edition produced by Beijing Coca-Cola company to celebrate Beijing's successful bid to host the Olympics.
Coca-Cola Vanilla	2002	Coca-Cola with a vanilla flavor.
Coca-Cola C2	2004	A mid-calorie version of Coca-Cola sweetened with both corn syrup and artificial sweeteners. It was first sold in Japan, and shortly expanded to North America. The drink was a flop, and was commonly replaced with Coca-Cola Zero upon its launch until it was fully discontinued in 2007.
Coca-Cola with Lime	2005	Coca-Cola with a lime flavor, introduced after the success of its diet counterpart.
Coca-Cola with Lemon	2005	Coca-Cola with a lemon flavor. Debuted in the United Kingdom, and was also available in Japan, France, Hong Kong, Brazil, and Hungary.
Coca-Cola Raspberry	2005	Coca-Cola with a raspberry flavor. It was originally exclusively sold in New Zealand for a short time and was later given a wider international release through the Coca-Cola Freestyle fountain machine.
Coca-Cola Zero/Coca-Cola Zero Sugar	2005	Low-calorie variant formulated to be more like standard Coca-Cola. It has had different formula changes over the years.
Coca-Cola Citra	2005	Coca-Cola with a Lemon-Lime flavor. It was first sold as a limited edition in Mexico and New Zealand, before gaining a release in Japan.
Coca-Cola Black Cherry Vanilla	2006	Coca-Cola with a combination of black cherry and vanilla flavor. It was only sold in North America as a replacement to Vanilla Coke, before the drink returned and re-replaced it in June 2007.
Coca-Cola Blāk	2006	Coca-Cola with a rich coffee flavor, of which the formula depends on the country. It was first sold in France, before being released in North America where it was discontinued in 2008.
Coca-Cola Orange	2007	Coca-Cola with an orange flavor, similar to that of the drink Mezzo Mix which is sold in DACH regions. It was available in the United Kingdom and Gibraltar as a limited edition for the summer of 2007. It was later given a wider international release through the Coca-Cola Freestyle fountain machine.
Coca-Cola Life	2014	A version of Coca-Cola with stevia and sugar as sweeteners rather than simply sugar. It was largely unsuccessful and was quietly discontinued in all territories by 2020.
Coca-Cola Ginger	2016	A version that mixes in the classic Coca-Cola formula with the taste of ginger beer. It was available as a limited edition in Vietnam, Australia, and New Zealand.
Coca-Cola Fiber+	2017	A dietary variant of Coca-Cola with added dietary fiber in the form of dextrin developed by Coca-Cola Asia Pacific. It is available in Asian territories such as Japan, Taiwan, mainland China, Hong Kong, Vietnam, and Mongolia.
Coca-Cola with Coffee	2017	Coca-Cola mixed in with coffee. It was originally introduced in Japan in 2017 before expanding to North America in January 2021, available in Dark Blend, Vanilla and Caramel variants along with Zero Sugar dark blend and vanilla variants. The North American unit was discontinued the following year.
Coca-Cola Peach	2018	Coca-Cola with a Peach flavor. It was made for and sold exclusively in Japan as a limited edition in 2018 and 2019 and later sold in China.
Coca-Cola Georgia Peach	2018	A hand-crafted Peach-flavored Coca-Cola sweetened with cane sugar. Sold in the United States.
Coca-Cola California Raspberry	2018	A hand-crafted Raspberry-flavored Coca-Cola sweetened with cane sugar. Sold in the United States.
Coca-Cola Orange Vanilla	2019	Coca-Cola with an orange vanilla flavor, intended to imitate the flavor of an orange Creamsicle. It was available nationwide in the United States on February 25, 2019. It was discontinued in late 2022 due to supply chain conditions caused by the COVID-19 pandemic.
Coca-Cola Energy	2019	An energy drink with a flavor similar to standard Coca-Cola, with guarana, vitamin B3 (niacinamide), vitamin B6 (pyridoxine hydrochloride), and extra caffeine. The drink debuted in Spain and Hungary in April 2019 and would go onto launch in Australia, the United Kingdom and other European territories throughout the year. The drink debuted in North America in 2020 and was largely unsuccessful, with Coca-Cola announcing its discontinuation in the latter market in May 2021, to focus more on its traditional beverages.
Coca-Cola Signature Mixers	2019	Premium variants of the original Coca-Cola formula that were made to blend in with different dark spirits. It was sold in Smokey, Spicy, Herbal and Woody varieties. They were sold in the United Kingdom from 2019 until 2022. Coca-Cola, signature mixers, smoky notes
Coca-Cola Apple	2019	Coca-Cola with an Apple flavor. Sold in Japan for a limited time in 2019 and was also made available in Hong Kong.
Coca-Cola Cinnamon	2019	Coca-Cola with cinnamon flavor. Released in October 2019 in the United States as a limited release for the 2019 holiday season. Made available again in 2020 for the holiday season.
Coca-Cola Strawberry	2020	Coca-Cola with a Strawberry flavor. Sold in Japan for a limited time in 2020 and later sold in China.
Coca-Cola Cherry Vanilla	2020	Coca-Cola with cherry vanilla flavor. Released in the United States on February 10, 2020. It was silently discontinued in 2024 following low sales.
Coca-Cola Energy Cherry	2020	Cherry-flavored variant of the standard Coca-Cola Energy. Debuted in North America in January 2020 and the United Kingdom in April.
Coca-Cola Creations	2022	Limited edition variants of the original Coca-Cola formula that were made to appeal to younger consumers, such as Coca-Cola Starlight and Coca-Cola Ultimate. They have been sold internationally as well.
Jack Daniel's and Coca-Cola	2022	A ready-to-drink canned mixture of Tennessee whiskey and Coca-Cola. It debuted in Mexico in November 2022, and expanded to the United Kingdom and North America in March 2023, before expanding to other European territories, Asia and Latin America.
Coca-Cola Spiced	2024	Coca-Cola with a Raspberry and spiced flavoring. It was sold in the United States and Canada from February until September 2024.
Oreo Coca-Cola Zero Sugar	2024	Limited edition variant of Coca-Cola made in collaboration with Oreo, sold in 35 countries across Europe, Asia, and North America starting in September 2025.
Coca-Cola Orange Cream	2025	Similar in flavor to 2019's Coca-Cola Orange Vanilla but "zestier, smoother and creamier". It was sold as a year-long limited edition in the United States and Canada from March 2025 until Early-2026.
Coca-Cola Cherry Float	2026	Similar to Coca-Cola Cherry Vanilla, but more creamer. Available in the United States, Canada and the United Kingdom from early-2026 as a new permanent variety.
Coca-Cola Cherry Lime	2027	A variant with Cherry and Lime flavoring. Will launch in the United States in February 2027.
Coca-Cola Strawberry Float	2027	A Strawberry-Vanilla variety, similar to that of Cherry Float. It will launch in the United States in the summer of 2027.

=== Logo design ===
The Coca-Cola logo was created by John Pemberton's bookkeeper, Frank Mason Robinson, in 1885. Robinson came up with the name and chose the logo's distinctive cursive script. The writing style used, known as Spencerian script, was developed in the mid-19th century and was the dominant form of formal handwriting in the United States during that period. The red and white colors were also Robinson's idea. The red logo was used 1891–1893 and was then reverted to black-and-white. However, red was always associated with the brand.

Robinson also played a significant role in early Coca-Cola advertising. His promotional suggestions to Pemberton included giving away thousands of free drink coupons and plastering the city of Atlanta with publicity banners and streetcar signs.

The red logo was brought back in 1941.

Coca-Cola came under scrutiny in Egypt in 1951 because of a conspiracy theory that the Coca-Cola logo, when reflected in a mirror, spells out "No Mohammed no Mecca" in Arabic.

=== Contour bottle design ===
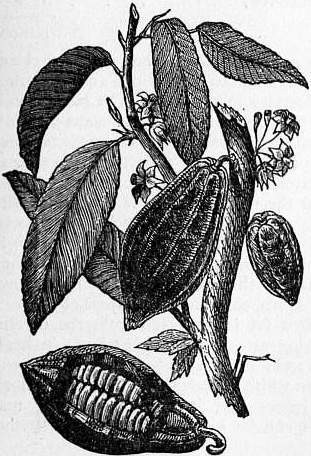
Illustration of a gourd-shaped cocoa pod in the Encyclopædia Britannica

The Coca-Cola bottle, called the "contour bottle" within the company, was created by bottle designer Earl R. Dean and Coca-Cola's general counsel, Harold Hirsch. In 1915, the company launched a competition among its bottle suppliers as well as any competition entrants to create a new distinctive bottle "which a person could recognize even if they felt it in the dark, and so shaped that, even if broken, a person could tell at a glance what it was."

Chapman J. Root, president of the Root Glass Company of Terre Haute, Indiana, turned the project over to members of his supervisory staff, including company auditor T. Clyde Edwards, plant superintendent Alexander Samuelsson, and Earl R. Dean, bottle designer and supervisor of the bottle molding room. Root and his subordinates decided to base the bottle's design on one of the soda's two ingredients, the coca leaf or the kola nut, but were unaware of what either ingredient looked like. Dean and Edwards went to the Emeline Fairbanks Memorial Library and were unable to find any information about coca or kola. Instead, Dean was inspired by a picture of the gourd-shaped cocoa pod in the Encyclopædia Britannica. Dean made a rough sketch of the pod and returned to the plant to show Root. He explained to Root how he could transform the shape of the pod into a bottle. Root gave Dean his approval.

Faced with the upcoming scheduled maintenance of the mold-making machinery, over the next 24 hours, Dean sketched out a concept drawing, which was approved by Root the next morning. Chapman Root approved the prototype bottle, and a design patent was issued on the bottle in November 1915. The prototype never made it to production since its middle diameter was larger than its base, making it unstable on conveyor belts. Dean resolved this issue by decreasing the bottle's middle diameter. During the 1916 bottler's convention, Dean's contour bottle was chosen over other entries and was on the market the same year. By 1920, the contour bottle became the standard for the Coca-Cola Company. A revised version was also patented in 1923. Because the Patent Office releases the Patent Gazette on Tuesday, the bottle was patented on December 25, 1923, and was nicknamed the "Christmas bottle". Today, the contour Coca-Cola bottle is one of the most recognized packages on the planet.

As a reward for his efforts, Dean was offered a choice between a $500 bonus or a lifetime job at The Root Glass Company. He chose the lifetime job and kept it until the Owens-Illinois Glass Company bought out The Root Glass Company in the mid-1930s. Dean went on to work in other Midwestern glass factories.

Raymond Loewy updated the design in 1955 to accommodate larger formats. Misinterpretations of comments Loewy made on his involvement have given rise to a popular misconception, misattributing him as the original designer of the Coke bottle.

Others have attributed inspiration for the design not to the cocoa pod, but to a Victorian hooped dress.

In 1944, Associate Justice Roger J. Traynor of the Supreme Court of California took advantage of a case involving a waitress injured by an exploding Coca-Cola bottle to articulate the doctrine of strict liability for defective products. Traynor's concurring opinion in Escola v. Coca-Cola Bottling Co. is widely recognized as a landmark case in US law today.

==== Examples ====
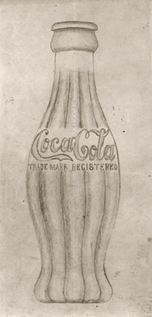
Earl R. Dean's original 1915 concept drawing of the contour Coca-Cola bottle

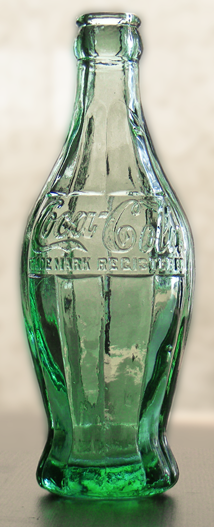
The prototype never made it to production since its middle diameter was larger than its base, making it unstable on conveyor belts.

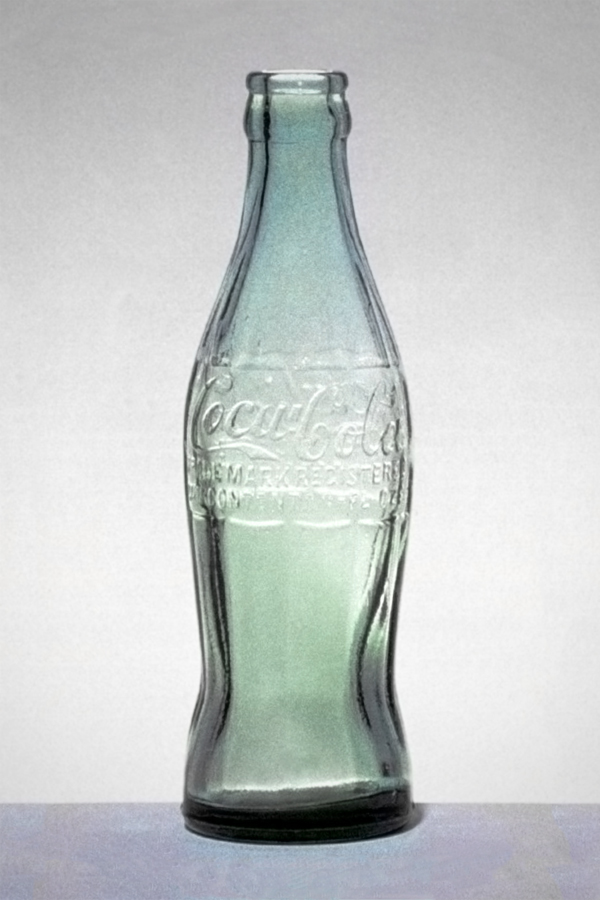
Final production version with slimmer middle section

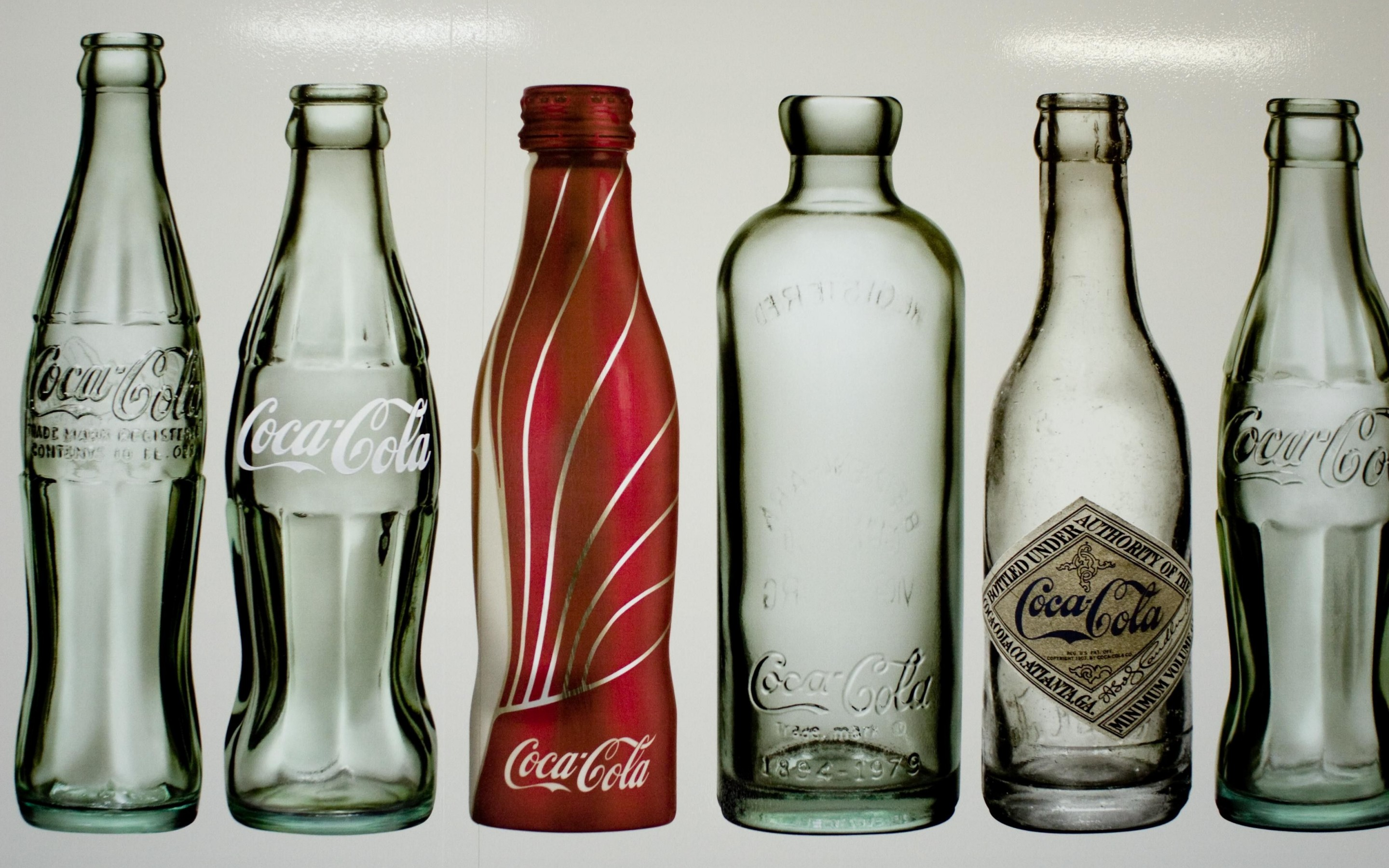
Numerous historical Coke bottles

=== Designer bottles ===
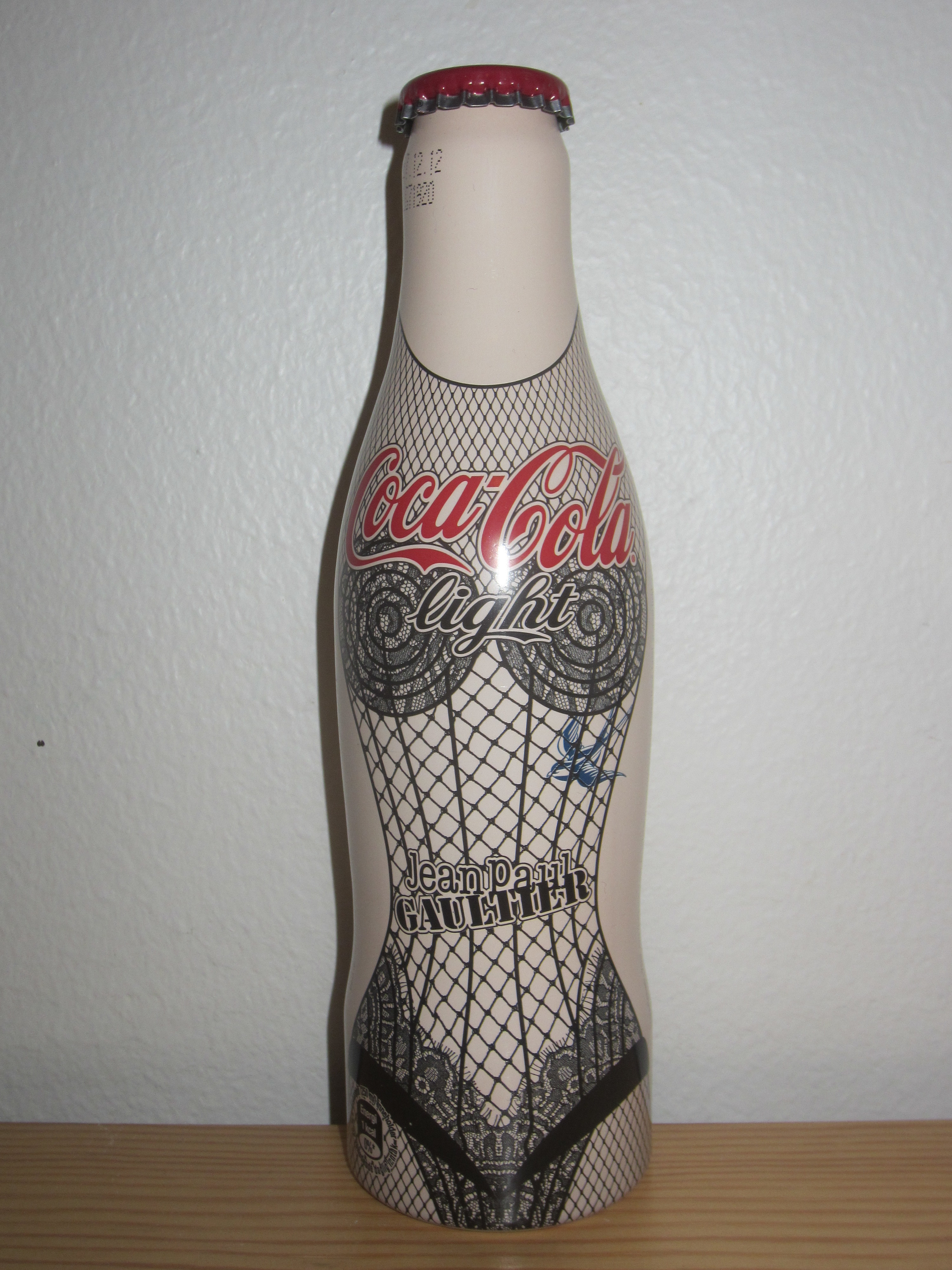
A Coca-Cola bottle designed by Jean Paul Gaultier and inspired by American singer Madonna

Karl Lagerfeld is the latest designer to have created a collection of aluminum bottles for Coca-Cola. Lagerfeld is not the first fashion designer to create a special version of the famous Coca-Cola Contour bottle. A number of other limited edition bottles by fashion designers for Coca-Cola Light soda have been created in the last few years, including Jean Paul Gaultier.

In 2009, in Italy, Coca-Cola Light had a Tribute to Fashion to celebrate 100 years of the recognizable contour bottle. Well known Italian designers Alberta Ferretti, Blumarine, Etro, Fendi, Marni, Missoni, Moschino, and Versace each designed limited edition bottles.

In 2019, Coca-Cola shared the first beverage bottle made with ocean plastic.

== Competitors ==
Pepsi, the flagship product of PepsiCo, the Coca-Cola Company's main rival in the soft drink industry, is usually second to Coke in sales, and outsells Coca-Cola in some markets. RC Cola, now owned by the Dr Pepper Snapple Group, the third-largest soft drink manufacturer, is also widely available.

Around the world, many local brands compete with Coke. In South and Central America Kola Real, also known as Big Cola, is a growing competitor to Coca-Cola. On the French island of Corsica, Corsica Cola, made by brewers of the local Pietra beer, is a growing competitor to Coca-Cola. In the French region of Brittany, Breizh Cola is available. In Peru, Inca Kola outsells Coca-Cola, which led the Coca-Cola Company to purchase the brand in 1999. In Sweden, julmust outsells Coca-Cola during the Christmas season. In Scotland, the locally produced Irn-Bru was more popular than Coca-Cola until 2005, when Coca-Cola and Diet Coke began to outpace its sales. In the former East Germany, Vita Cola, invented during communist rule, is gaining popularity.

While Coca-Cola does not have the majority of the market share in India, The Coca-Cola Company's other brands like Thums Up and Sprite perform well. The Coca-Cola Company purchased Thums Up in 1993 when they re-entered the Indian market. As of 2023, Coca-Cola held a 9% market-share in India while Thums Up and Sprite had a 16% and 20% market share respectively.

Tropicola, a domestic drink, is served in Cuba instead of Coca-Cola, due to a United States embargo. French brand Mecca-Cola and British brand Qibla Cola are competitors to Coca-Cola in the Middle East.

In Turkey, Cola Turka, in Iran and the Middle East, Zamzam and Parsi Cola, in some parts of China, Future Cola, in the Czech Republic and Slovakia, Kofola, in Slovenia, Cockta, and the inexpensive Mercator Cola, sold only in the country's biggest supermarket chain, Mercator, are some of the brand's competitors.

In 2021, Coca-Cola petitioned to cancel registrations for the marks Thums Up and Limca issued to Meenaxi Enterprise, Inc. based on misrepresentation of source. The Trademark Trial and Appeal Board concluded that "Meenaxi engaged in blatant misuse in a manner calculated to trade on the goodwill and reputation of Coca-Cola in an attempt to confuse consumers in the United States that its Thums Up and Limca marks were licensed or produced by the source of the same types of cola and lemon-lime soda sold under these marks for decades in India."

== Advertising ==
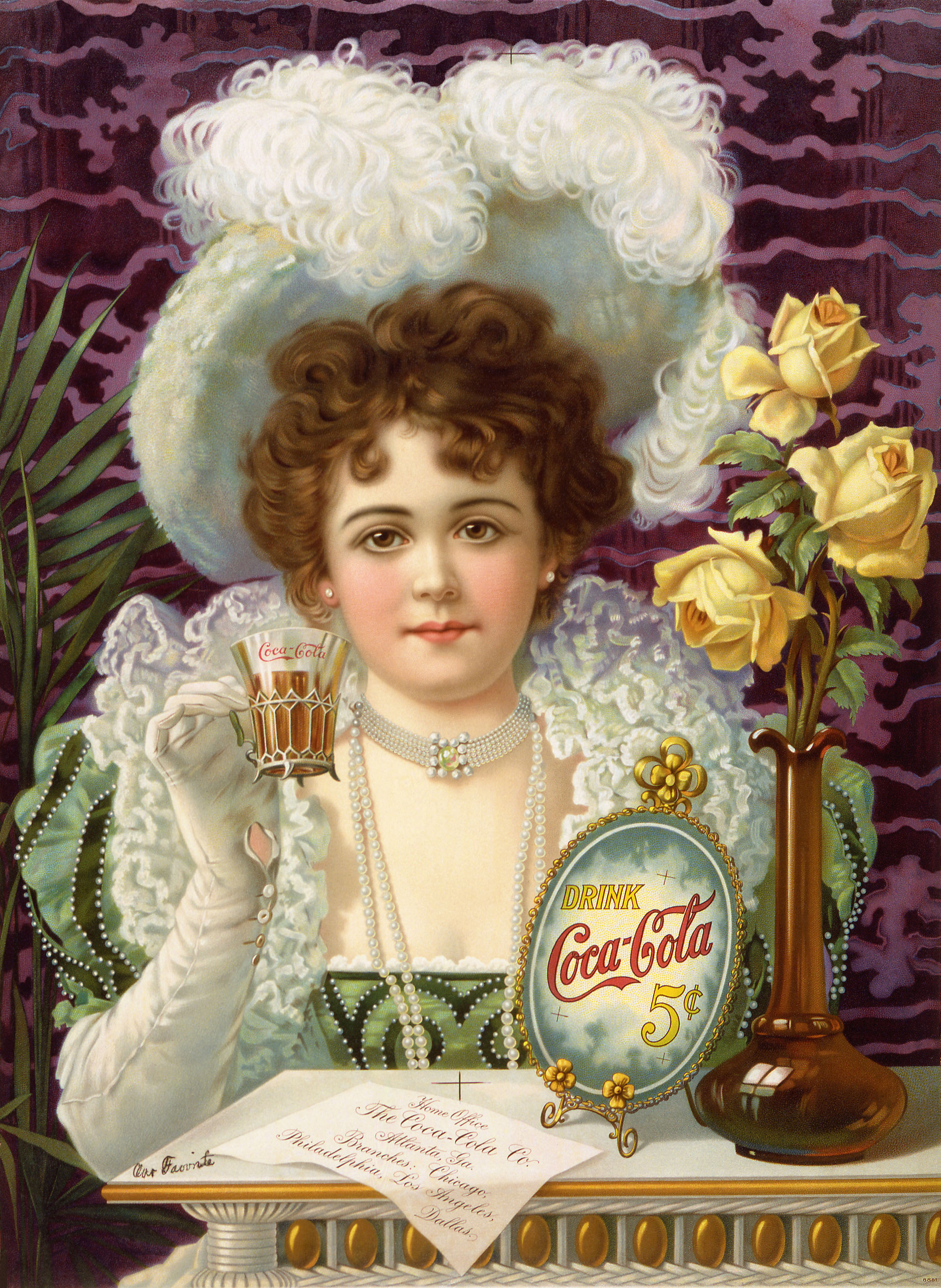
An 1890s advertisement showing model and operetta star Hilda Clark in formal 19th century attire. The ad is titled Drink Coca-Cola 5¢. (US).

Coca-Cola's first-ever advertisement was inside an 1886 issue of the Atlanta Journal, calling the drink "Delicious! Refreshing! Exhilarating! Invigorating!"

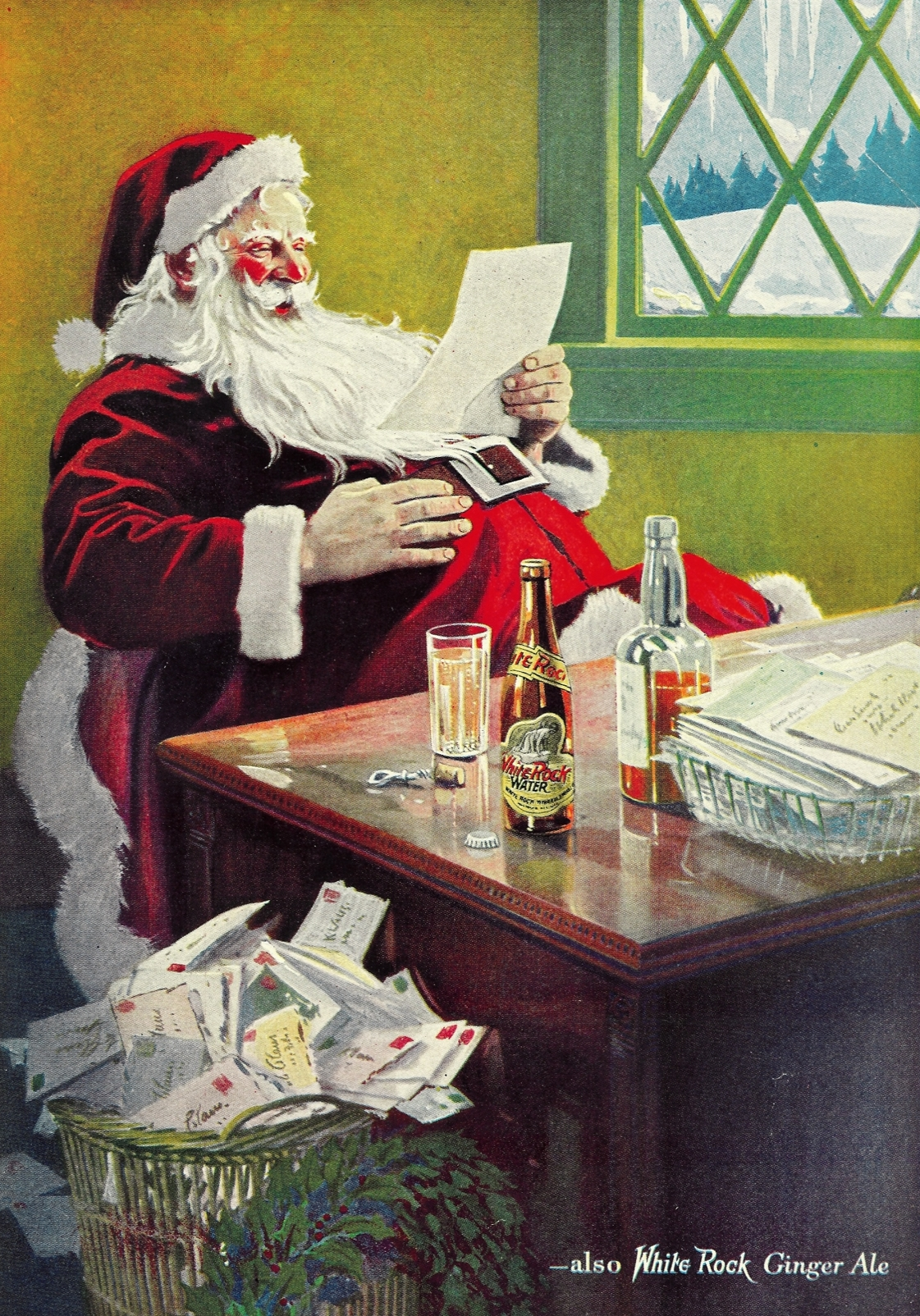
Santa Claus in a White Rock Beverages ad from December 1923; pre-dating Coca-Cola's usage of Santa

Coca-Cola's advertising has significantly affected American culture, and it is frequently credited with inventing the modern image of Santa Claus as an old man in a red-and-white suit. Although the company did start using the red-and-white Santa image in the 1930s, with its winter advertising campaigns illustrated by Haddon Sundblom, the motif was already common. Coca-Cola was not even the first soft drink company to use the modern image of Santa Claus in its advertising: White Rock Beverages used Santa in advertisements for its ginger ale in 1923, after first using him to sell mineral water in 1915.

Before Santa Claus, Coca-Cola relied on images of smartly dressed young women to sell its beverages. Coca-Cola's first such advertisement appeared in 1895, featuring the young Bostonian actress Hilda Clark as its spokeswoman.

1941 saw the first use of the nickname "Coke" as an official trademark for the product, with a series of advertisements informing consumers that "Coke means Coca-Cola". In 1971, a song from a Coca-Cola commercial called "I'd Like to Teach the World to Sing", produced by Billy Davis, became a hit single. During the 1950s the term cola wars emerged, describing the on-going battle between Coca-Cola and Pepsi for supremacy in the soft drink industry. Coca-Cola and Pepsi were competing with new products, global expansion, US marketing initiatives and sport sponsorships.

Coke's advertising is pervasive, as one of Woodruff's stated goals was to ensure that everyone on Earth drank Coca-Cola as their preferred beverage. This is especially true in southern areas of the United States, such as Atlanta, where Coke was born.

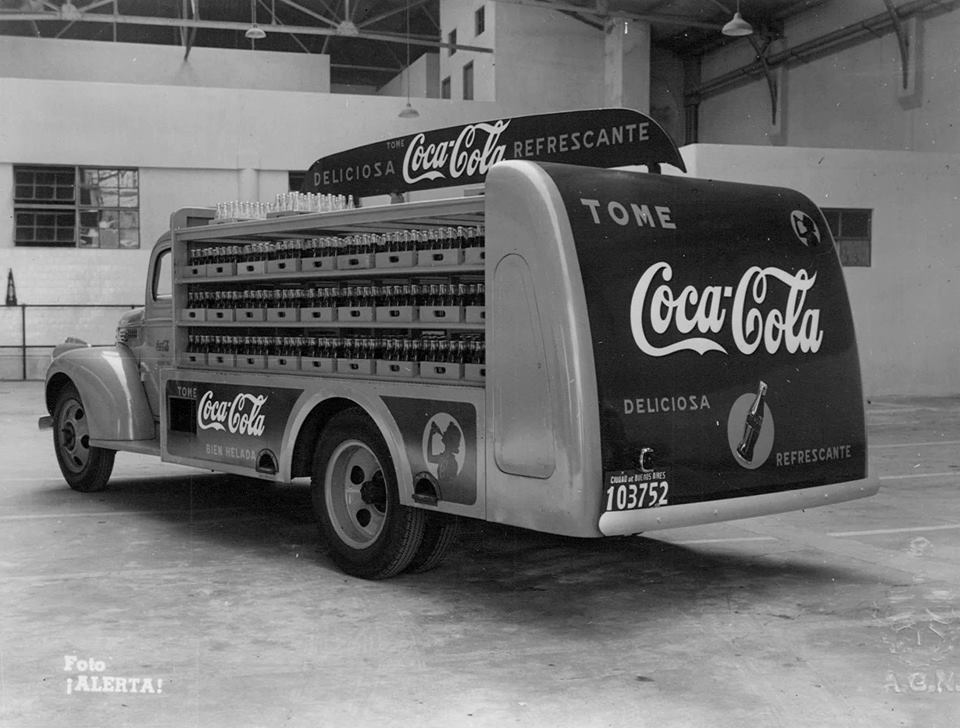
Coca-Cola delivery truck of Argentina, with the slogan "Drink Coca-Cola – delicious, refreshing"

Some Coca-Cola television commercials between 1960 through 1986 were written and produced by former Atlanta radio veteran Don Naylor (WGST 1936–1950, WAGA 1951–1959) during his career as a producer for the McCann Erickson advertising agency. Many of these early television commercials for Coca-Cola featured movie stars, sports heroes, and popular singers.

During the 1980s, Pepsi ran a series of television advertisements showing people participating in taste tests demonstrating that, according to the commercials, "fifty percent of the participants who said they preferred Coke actually chose the Pepsi." Coca-Cola ran ads to combat Pepsi's ads in an incident sometimes referred to as the cola wars; one of Coke's ads compared the so-called Pepsi challenge to two chimpanzees deciding which tennis ball was furrier. Thereafter, Coca-Cola regained its leadership in the market.

Selena was a spokesperson for Coca-Cola from 1989 until the time of her death. She filmed three commercials for the company. During 1994, to commemorate her five years with the company, Coca-Cola issued special Selena coke bottles.

The Coca-Cola Company purchased Columbia Pictures in 1982, and began inserting Coke-product images into many of its films. After a few early successes during Coca-Cola's ownership, Columbia began to underperform, and the studio was sold to Sony in 1989.

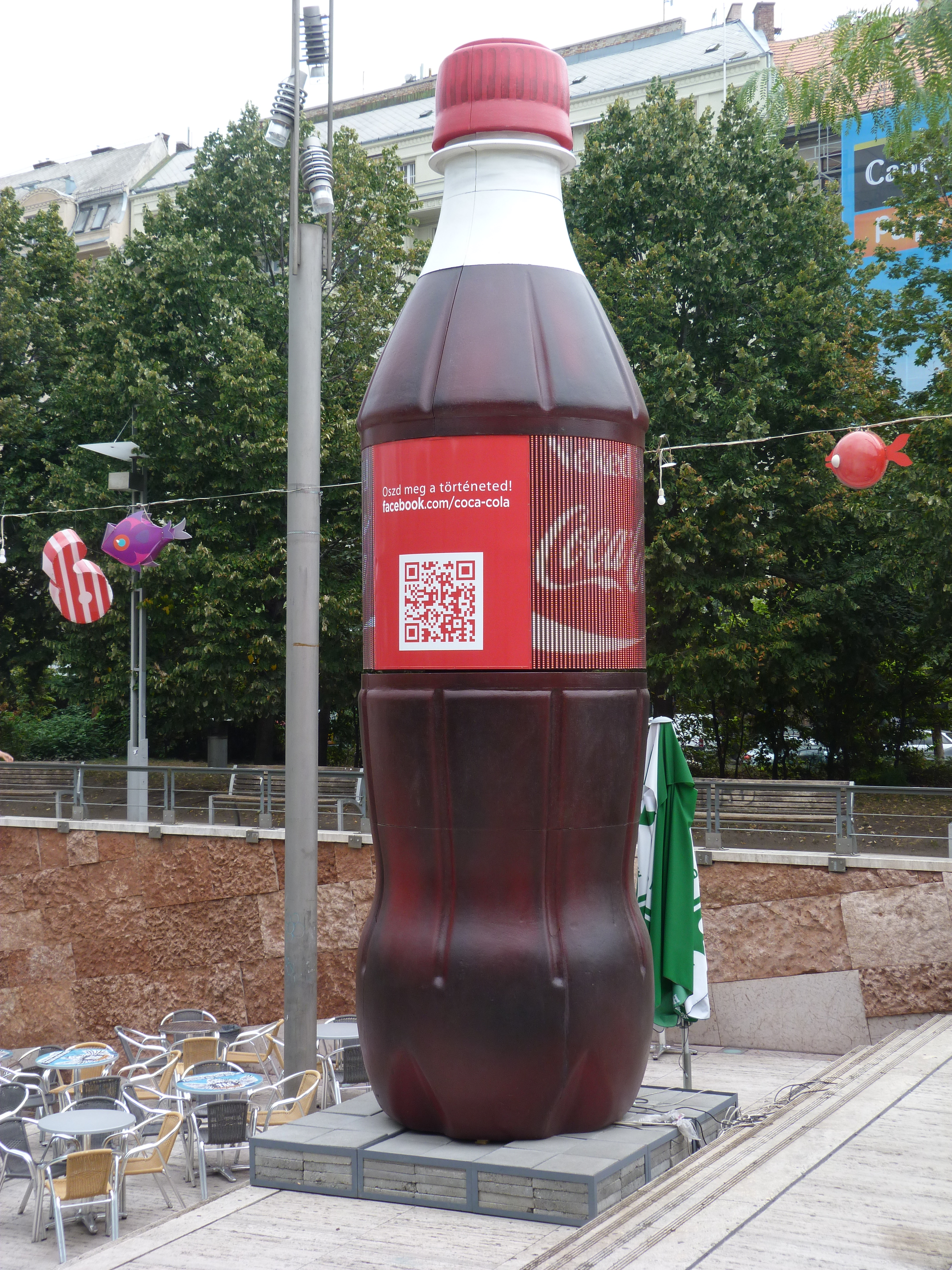
Coke advertisement in Budapest, 2013

Coca-Cola has gone through a number of different advertising slogans in its long history, including "It's the real thing", "The pause that refreshes", "I'd like to buy the world a Coke", and "Coke is it".

In 1999, the Coca-Cola Company introduced the Coke Card, a loyalty program that offered deals on items like clothes, entertainment and food when the cardholder purchased a Coca-Cola Classic. The scheme was cancelled after three years, with a Coca-Cola spokesperson declining to state why.

The company then introduced another loyalty campaign in 2006, My Coke Rewards. This allows consumers to earn points by entering codes from specially marked packages of Coca-Cola products into a website. These points can be redeemed for various prizes or sweepstakes entries.

In Australia in 2011, Coca-Cola began the "share a Coke" campaign, where the Coca-Cola logo was replaced on the bottles and replaced with first names. Coca-Cola used the 150 most popular names in Australia to print on the bottles. The campaign was paired with a website page, Facebook page, and an online "share a virtual Coke". The same campaign was introduced to Coca-Cola, Diet Coke and Coke Zero bottles and cans in the UK in 2013.

Coca-Cola has also advertised its product to be consumed as a breakfast beverage, instead of coffee or tea for the morning caffeine.

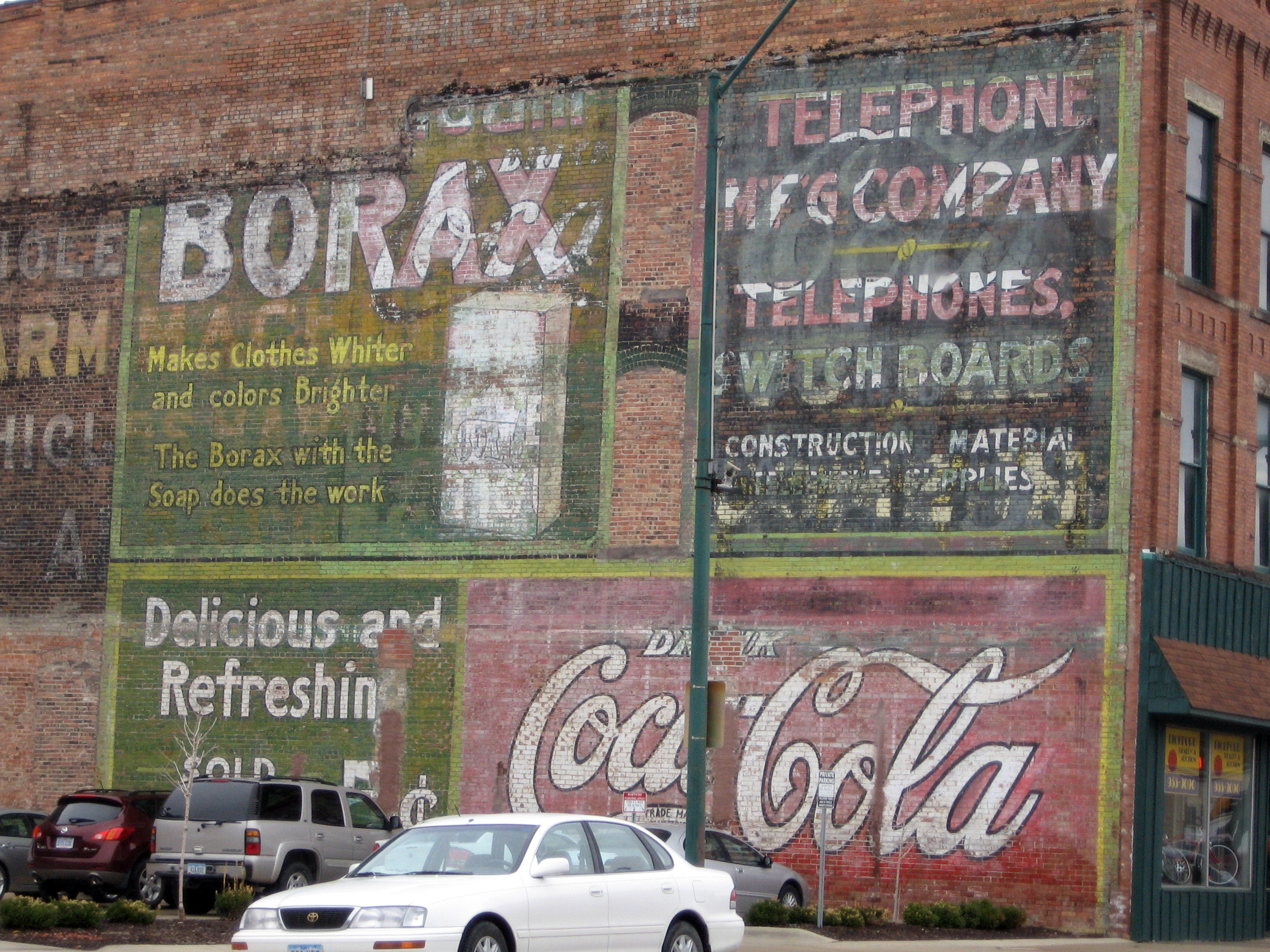
Coca-Cola ghost sign in Fort Dodge, Iowa. Older Coca-Cola ghosts behind Borax and telephone ads. April 2008.

=== 5 cents ===
From 1886 to 1959, the price of Coca-Cola was fixed at five cents, in part due to an advertising campaign.

=== Holiday campaigns ===
Throughout the years, Coca-Cola has released limited-time collector bottles for Christmas.

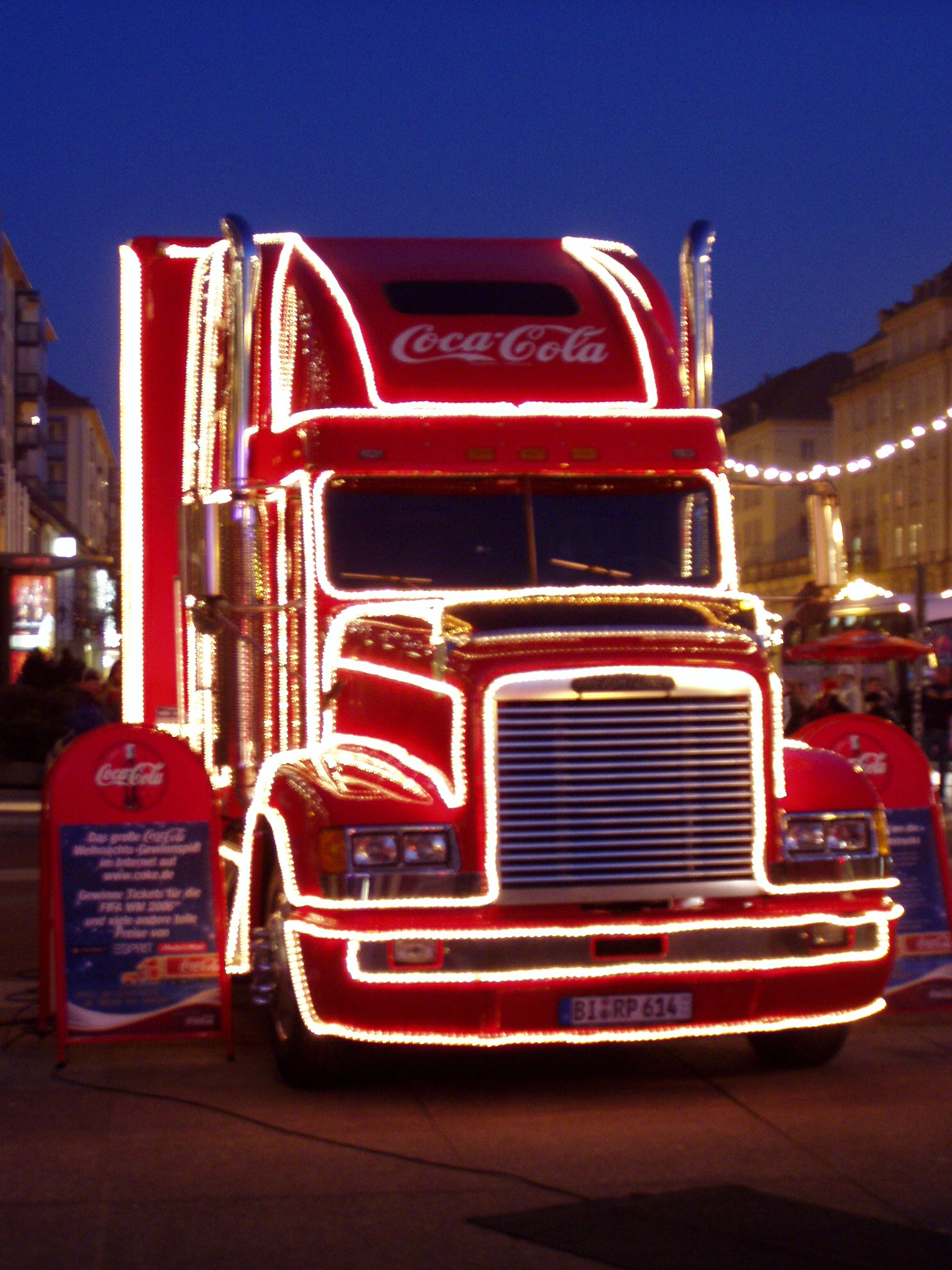
A Freightliner Coca-Cola Christmas truck in Dresden, Germany, 2004

Debuted in 1995, the "Holidays are coming!" advertisement featured a train of red delivery trucks, emblazoned with the Coca-Cola name and decorated with Christmas lights, driving through a snowy landscape and causing everything that they pass to light up and people to watch as they pass through.

The advertisement fell into disuse in 2001, as the Coca-Cola Company restructured its advertising campaigns so that advertising around the world was produced locally in each country, rather than centrally in the company's headquarters in Atlanta, Georgia. In 2007, the company brought back the campaign after, according to the company, many consumers telephoned its information center saying that they considered it to mark the beginning of Christmas. The advertisement was created by US advertising agency Doner, and has been part of the company's global advertising campaign for many years.

Keith Law, a producer and writer of commercials for Belfast CityBeat, was not convinced by Coca-Cola's reintroduction of the advertisement in 2007, saying that "I do not think there's anything Christmassy about HGVs and the commercial is too generic."

In 2001, singer Melanie Thornton recorded the campaign's advertising jingle as a single, "Wonderful Dream (Holidays Are Coming)", which entered the pop-music charts in Germany at no. 9. In 2005, Coca-Cola expanded the advertising campaign to radio, employing several variations of the jingle.

In 2011, Coca-Cola launched a campaign for the Indian holiday Diwali. The campaign included commercials, a song, and an integration with Shah Rukh Khan's film Ra.One.

In November 2024, Coca-Cola released three short AI-generated videos as its Christmas ads, reviving the original 1995 "Holidays are Coming" commercials. The ads were created by three AI studios: Secret Level, Silverside AI, and the Wild Card. Upon its release, the commercials drew backlash on social media, including criticism from Alex Hirsch, the creator of Gravity Falls. The company defended the ads, writing to The New York Times "Coca-Cola will always remain dedicated to creating the highest level of work at the intersection of human creativity and technology". The next year, in November 2025, Coca-Cola released another artificial intelligence commercial, executives claiming that this time it is more different from last year's.

=== Sports sponsorship ===
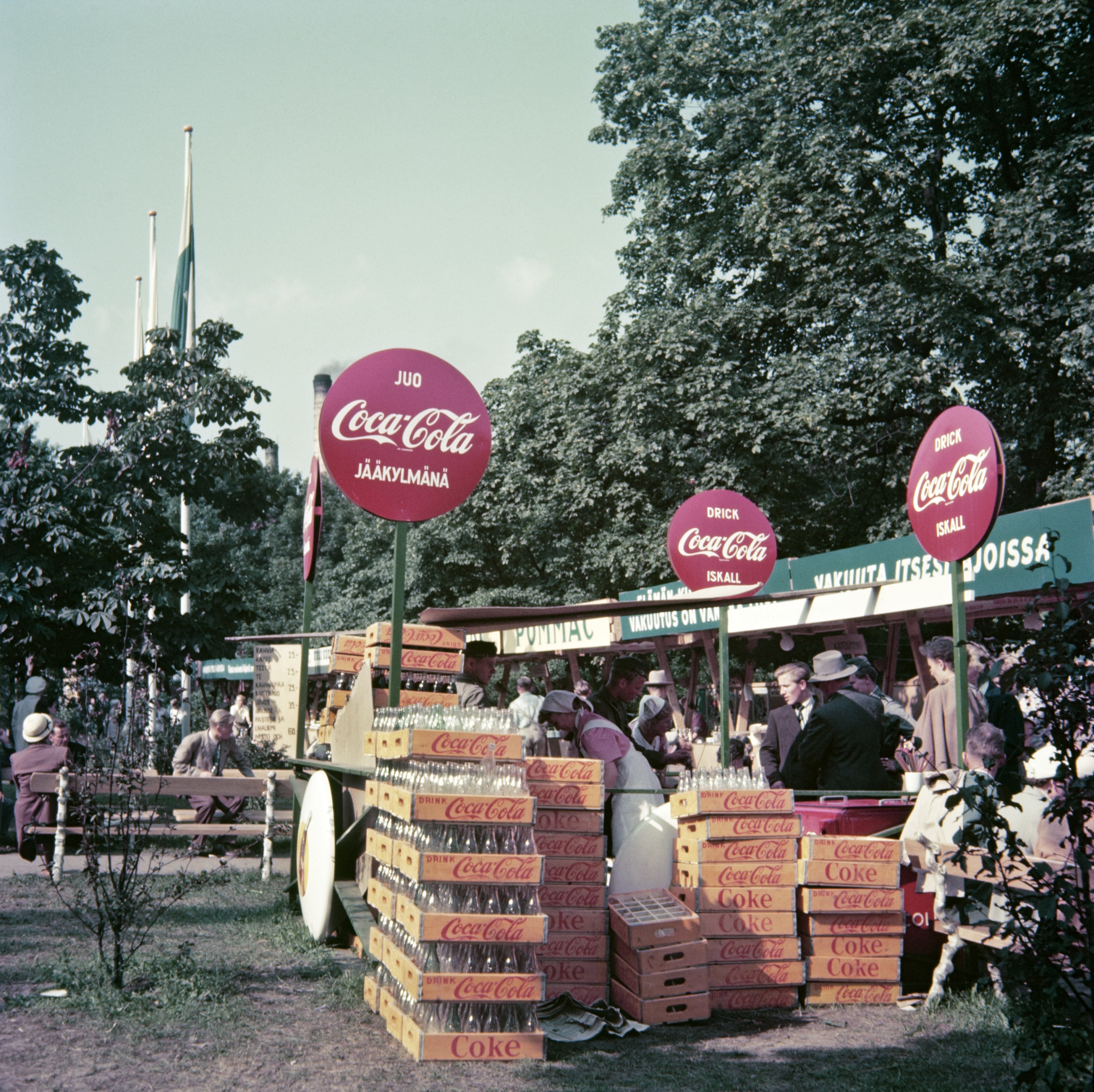
Competition drinks sales point in Helsinki during the 1952 Olympics

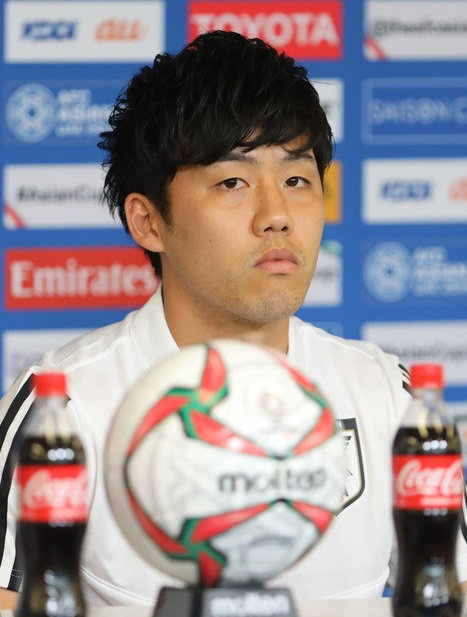
Coca-Cola bottles at a football press conference in 2019

Coca-Cola was the first commercial sponsor of the Olympic Games, at the 1928 games in Amsterdam, and has been an Olympics sponsor ever since. This corporate sponsorship included the 1996 Summer Olympics hosted in Atlanta, which allowed Coca-Cola to spotlight its hometown. Most recently, Coca-Cola has released localized commercials for the 2010 Winter Olympics in Vancouver; one Canadian commercial referred to Canada's hockey heritage and was modified after Canada won the gold medal game on February 28, 2010, by changing the ending line of the commercial to say "Now they know whose game they're playing".

Since 1978, Coca-Cola has sponsored the FIFA World Cup, and other competitions organized by FIFA. One FIFA tournament trophy, the FIFA World Youth Championship from Tunisia in 1977 to Malaysia in 1997, was called "FIFA – Coca-Cola Cup". In addition, Coca-Cola sponsors NASCAR's annual Coca-Cola 600 and Coke Zero Sugar 400 at Charlotte Motor Speedway in Concord, North Carolina and Daytona International Speedway in Daytona, Florida, respectively; since 2020, Coca-Cola has served as a premier partner of the NASCAR Cup Series, which includes being the presenting sponsor of the series' regular season championship trophy. Coca-Cola is also the sponsor of the iRacing Pro Series.

Coca-Cola has a long history of sports marketing relationships, which over the years have included Major League Baseball, the National Football League, the National Basketball Association, and the National Hockey League, as well as with many teams within those leagues. Coca-Cola has had a longtime relationship with the NFL's Pittsburgh Steelers, due in part to the now-famous 1979 television commercial featuring "Mean Joe" Greene, leading to the two opening the Coca-Cola Great Hall at Heinz Field in 2001 and a more recent Coca-Cola Zero commercial featuring Troy Polamalu.

Coca-Cola is the official soft drink of many collegiate football teams throughout the nation, partly due to Coca-Cola providing those schools with upgraded athletic facilities in exchange for Coca-Cola's sponsorship. This is especially prevalent at the high school level, which is more dependent on such contracts due to tighter budgets.

Coca-Cola was one of the official sponsors of the 1996 Cricket World Cup held on the Indian subcontinent. Coca-Cola is also one of the associate sponsors of Delhi Capitals in the Indian Premier League.

In England, Coca-Cola was the main sponsor of The Football League between 2004 and 2010, a name given to the three professional divisions below the Premier League in soccer. In 2005, Coca-Cola launched a competition for the 72 clubs of The Football League – it was called "Win a Player". This allowed fans to place one vote per day for their favorite club, with one entry being chosen at random earning £250,000 for the club; this was repeated in 2006. The "Win A Player" competition was very controversial, as at the end of the 2 competitions, Leeds United A.F.C. had the most votes by more than double, yet they did not win any money to spend on a new player for the club. In 2007, the competition changed to "Buy a Player". This competition allowed fans to buy a bottle of Coca-Cola or Coca-Cola Zero and submit the code on the wrapper on the Coca-Cola website. This code could then earn anything from 50p to £100,000 for a club of their choice. This competition was favored over the old "Win a Player" competition, as it allowed all clubs to win some money. Between 1992 and 1998, Coca-Cola was the title sponsor of the Football League Cup (Coca-Cola Cup), the secondary cup tournament of England. Starting in 2019–20 season, Coca-Cola has agreed its biggest UK sponsorship deal by becoming Premier League soccer's seventh and final commercial partner for the UK and Ireland, China, Malaysia, Indonesia, Singapore, Egyptian and the West African markets.

Between 1994 and 1997, Coca-Cola was also the title sponsor of the Scottish League Cup, renaming it to the Coca-Cola Cup like its English counterpart. From 1998 to 2001, the company was the title sponsor of the Irish League Cup in Northern Ireland, where it was named the Coca-Cola League Cup.

Coca-Cola is the presenting sponsor of the Tour Championship, the final event of the PGA Tour held each year at East Lake Golf Club in Atlanta, Georgia.

Introduced March 1, 2010, in Canada, to celebrate the 2010 Winter Olympics, Coca-Cola sold gold colored cans in packs of 12 355 mL (12 imp fl oz; 12 US fl oz) each, in select stores.

Coca-Cola which has been a partner with UEFA since 1988.

=== In mass media ===
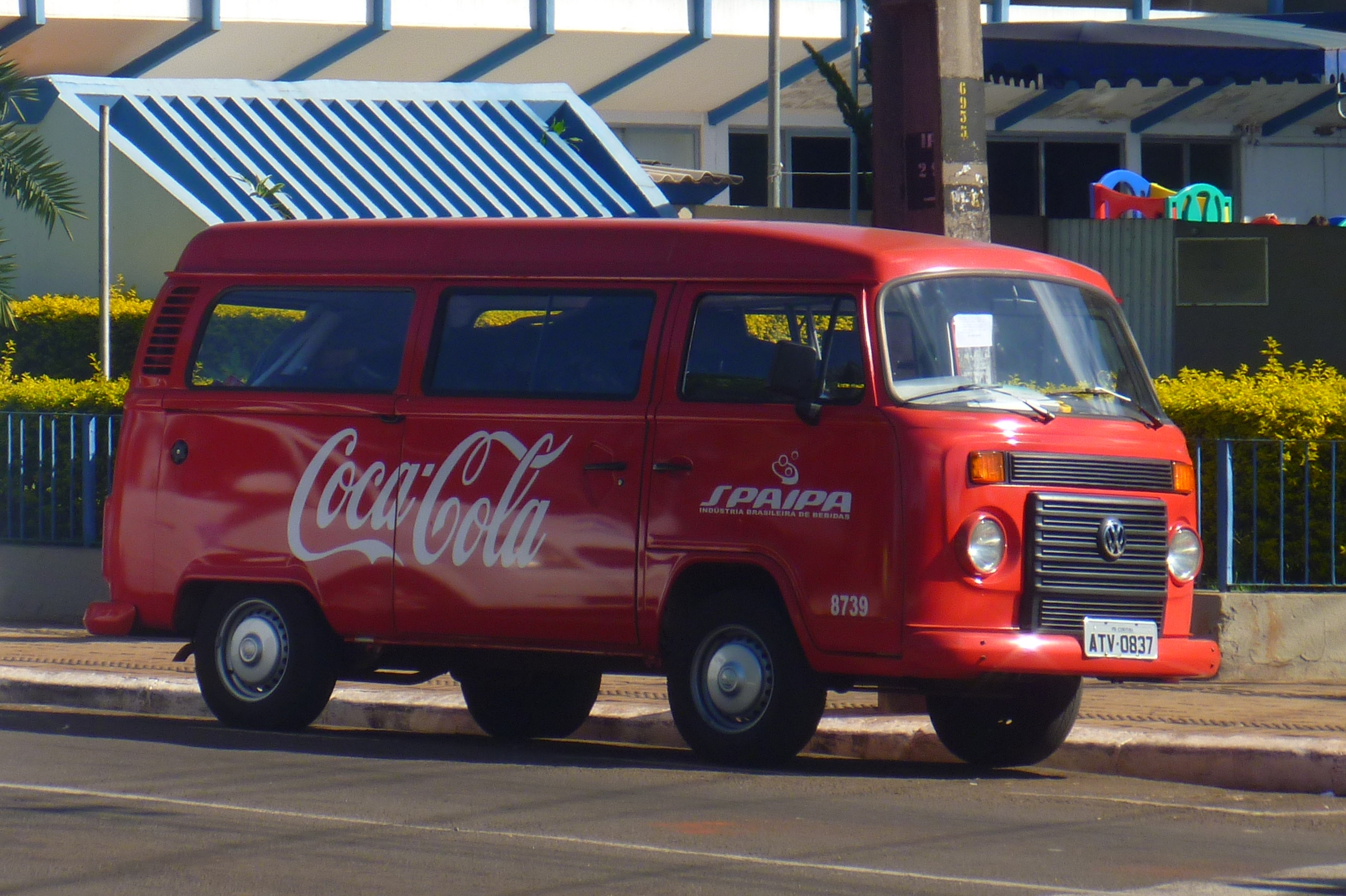
Coca-Cola advertised on a Volkswagen T2 in Maringá, Paraná, Brazil, 2012

Coca-Cola has been prominently featured in many films and television programs. It was a major plot element in films such as One, Two, Three, The Coca-Cola Kid, and The Gods Must Be Crazy, among many others. In music, such as in the Beatles' song, "Come Together", the lyrics say, "He shoot Coca-Cola". The Beach Boys also referenced Coca-Cola in their 1964 song "All Summer Long", singing "Member when you spilled Coke all over your blouse?"

The best selling solo artist of all time Elvis Presley, promoted Coca-Cola during his last tour of 1977. The Coca-Cola Company used Presley's image to promote the product. For example, the company used a song performed by Presley, "A Little Less Conversation", in a Japanese Coca-Cola commercial.

Other artists that promoted Coca-Cola include David Bowie, George Michael, Elton John, and Whitney Houston, who appeared in the Diet Coke commercial, among many others.

Not all musical references to Coca-Cola went well. A line in "Lola" by the Kinks was originally recorded as "You drink champagne and it tastes just like Coca-Cola." When the British Broadcasting Corporation refused to play the song because of the commercial reference, lead singer Ray Davies re-recorded the lyric as "it tastes just like cherry cola" to get airplay for the song.

Political cartoonist Michel Kichka satirized a famous Coca-Cola billboard in his 1982 poster "And I Love New York." On the billboard, the Coca-Cola wave is accompanied by the words "Enjoy Coke." In Kichka's poster, the lettering and script above the Coca-Cola wave instead read "Enjoy Cocaine."

== Use as political and corporate symbol ==
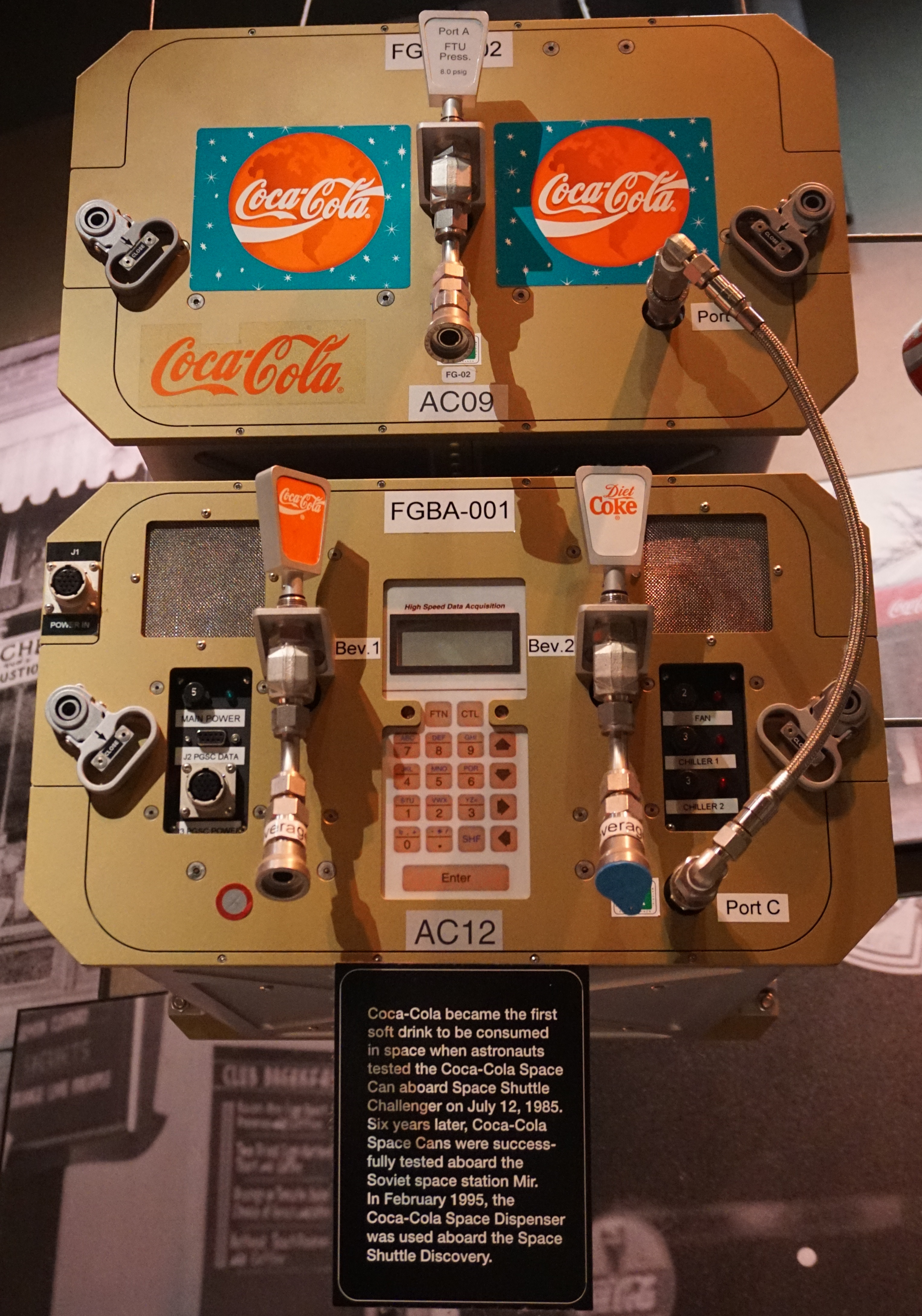
Astronauts served Coca-Cola from this device on the Space Shuttle in 1995.

Coca-Cola has a high degree of identification with the United States, being considered by some an "American Brand" or as an item representing America, criticized as Cocacolonization. After World War II, this gave rise to the brief production of White Coke at the request of and for Soviet Marshal Georgy Zhukov, who did not want to be seen drinking a symbol of American imperialism. The bottles were given by the President Eisenhower during a conference, and Marshal Zhukov enjoyed the drink. The bottles were disguised as vodka bottles, with the cap having a red star design, to avoid suspicion of Soviet officials.

Coca-Cola was introduced to China in 1927, and was very popular until 1949. After the Chinese Civil War ended in 1949, the beverage was no longer imported into China, as it was perceived to be a symbol of decadent Western culture and capitalist lifestyle. Importation and sales of the beverage resumed in 1979, after diplomatic relations between the United States and China were restored. The agreement to allow Coca-Cola into the Chinese market was reached during Deng Xiaoping's visit to the United States.

There are some consumer boycotts of Coca-Cola in Arab countries due to Coke's early investment in Israel during the Arab League boycott of Israel (its competitor Pepsi stayed longer out of Israel). Mecca-Cola and Pepsi are popular alternatives in the Middle East.

A Coca-Cola fountain dispenser (officially a Fluids Generic Bioprocessing Apparatus or FGBA) was developed for use on the Space Shuttle as a test bed to determine if carbonated beverages can be produced from separately stored carbon dioxide, water, and flavored syrups and determine if the resulting fluids can be made available for consumption without bubble nucleation and resulting foam formation. FGBA-1 flew on STS-63 in 1995 and dispensed pre-mixed beverages, followed by FGBA-2 on STS-77 the next year. The latter mixed CO_{2}, water, and syrup to make beverages. It supplied 1.65 liters each of Coca-Cola and Diet Coke.

The drink is also often a metonym for the Coca-Cola Company.

== Medicinal application ==
Coca-Cola is sometimes used for the treatment of gastric phytobezoars. In about 50% of cases studied, Coca-Cola alone was found to be effective in gastric phytobezoar dissolution. This treatment can however result in the potential of developing small bowel obstruction in a minority of cases, necessitating surgical intervention.

== Criticism ==
Criticism of Coca-Cola has arisen from various groups around the world, concerning a variety of issues, including health effects, environmental issues, and business practices. The drink's coca flavoring, and the nickname "Coke", remain a common theme of criticism due to the relationship with the illegal drug cocaine. In 1911, the US government seized 40 barrels and 20 kegs of Coca-Cola syrup in Chattanooga, Tennessee, alleging the caffeine in its drink was "injurious to health", leading to amended food safety legislation.

Beginning in the 1940s, PepsiCo started marketing their drinks to African Americans, a niche market that was largely ignored by white-owned manufacturers in the US, and was able to use its anti-racism stance as a selling point, attacking Coke's reluctance to hire blacks and support by the chairman of the Coca-Cola Company for segregationist Governor of Georgia Herman Talmadge. As a result of this campaign, PepsiCo's market share as compared to Coca-Cola's shot up dramatically in the 1950s with African American soft-drink consumers three times more likely to purchase Pepsi over Coke.

The Coca-Cola Company, its subsidiaries and products have been subject to sustained criticism by consumer groups, environmentalists, and watchdogs, particularly since the early 2000s. In 2019, BreakFreeFromPlastic named Coca-Cola the single biggest plastic polluter in the world. After 72,541 volunteers collected 476,423 pieces of plastic waste from around where they lived, a total of 11,732 pieces were found to be labeled with a Coca-Cola brand (including the Dasani, Sprite, and Fanta brands) in 37 countries across four continents. At the 2020 World Economic Forum in Davos, Coca-Cola's head of sustainability, Bea Perez, said customers like them because they reseal and are lightweight, and "business won't be in business if we don't accommodate consumers." In February 2022, Coca-Cola announced that it will aim to make 25 percent of its packaging reusable by 2030.

Coca-Cola Classic is rich in sugars, especially sucrose, which causes dental caries when consumed regularly. Besides this, the high caloric value of the sugars themselves can contribute to obesity. Both are major health issues in the developed world.

In February 2021, Coca-Cola received criticism after a video of a training session, which told employees to "try to be less white", was leaked by an employee. The session also said in order to be "less white" employees had to be less "arrogant" and "defensive".

The company, along with PepsiCo and other American conglomerates, has faced criticism and an ongoing boycott by the pro-Palestine movement, especially amidst the Gaza war. Critics pointed to the company's ties with Israel, including its donations to far-right Zionist organization Im Tirtzu, to justify the boycott. In June 2024, Coca-Cola's Bangladesh distributor ran an ad in Bangladesh—where it faced a heavy boycott—attempting to distance the company from Israel.

=== Colombian death-squad allegations ===
In July 2001, the Coca-Cola Company was sued over its alleged use of far-right death squads (the United Self-Defense Forces of Colombia) to kidnap, torture, and kill Colombian bottler workers that were linked with trade union activity. Coca-Cola was sued in a US federal court in Miami by the Colombian food and drink union Sinaltrainal. The suit alleged that Coca-Cola was indirectly responsible for having "contracted with or otherwise directed paramilitary security forces that utilized extreme violence and murdered, tortured, unlawfully detained or otherwise silenced trade union leaders". This sparked campaigns to boycott Coca-Cola in the UK, US, Germany, Italy, and Australia. Javier Correa, the president of Sinaltrainal, said the campaign aimed to put pressure on Coca-Cola "to mitigate the pain and suffering" that union members had suffered.

Speaking from the Coca-Cola Company's headquarters in Atlanta, company spokesperson Rafael Fernandez Quiros said "Coca-Cola denies any connection to any human-rights violation of this type" and added "We do not own or operate the plants".

== Other uses ==
Coca-Cola can be used to remove grease and oil stains from concrete, metal, and clothes. It can also be used to delay concrete from setting.

== See also ==
- The Coca-Cola Company
- Coca-Cola HBC AG
- Coca-Cola treatment of phytobezoars
- Colalife
- Fanta
- List of Coca-Cola brands
- List of soft drink flavors
- Mexican Coke
- Neiman Marcus
- OpenCola (drink)
- Premix and postmix
