= Earl R. Dean =

American industrial designer (1890–1972)

- Born: March 19, 1890; Terre Haute, IN
- Died: January 8, 1972 (aged 81)

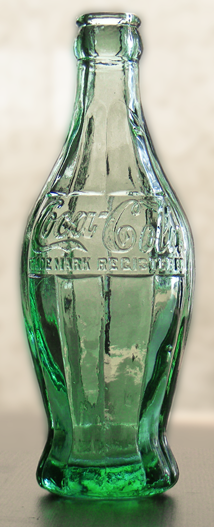
The 1915 contour bottle prototype designed by Earl R. Dean

US Design Patent for a Bottle or Similar Article USD48160 (Coca-Cola bottle)

Earl R. Dean (March 19, 1890 – January 8, 1972) designed the famous contour Coca-Cola bottle.

In 1914, Harold Hirsch, a lawyer for the Coca-Cola Company, came up with a plan to launch a national competition in which bottle manufactures across the country would be asked to design a distinctive bottle – a bottle which a person could recognize even if they felt it in the dark, and so shaped that, even if broken, a person could tell at a glance what it was.

The bottle manufacturer that won this competition was the Root Glass Company of Terre Haute, Indiana. Inspired by a picture of a cocoa pod which was found in an encyclopedia at the Emeline Fairbanks Memorial Library, Earl R. Dean made a pencil sketch of the pod. From this sketch, Dean designed the contour bottle prototype. The prototype never made it to production since its middle diameter was larger than its base. According to Dean, this would make it unstable on the conveyor belts. Dean then equalized the middle and bottom diameters and the Contour Coca-Cola bottle was created.
