= Golden Coca-Cola =

Limited edition of Coca-Cola

Golden Coca-Cola was a limited edition of Coca-Cola, produced by Beijing Coca-Cola company to celebrate Beijing's successful bid to host the Olympics. The company produced 30,000 boxes on July 13, 2001. The can is printed in gold and red with patterns of athletes, famous Chinese buildings and fireworks. A slogan "Holding hands for Olympics, Celebrating for China" is printed on the can in simplified Chinese.
