= Coca-Cola Fatwa =

Fatwa on soft drink consumption

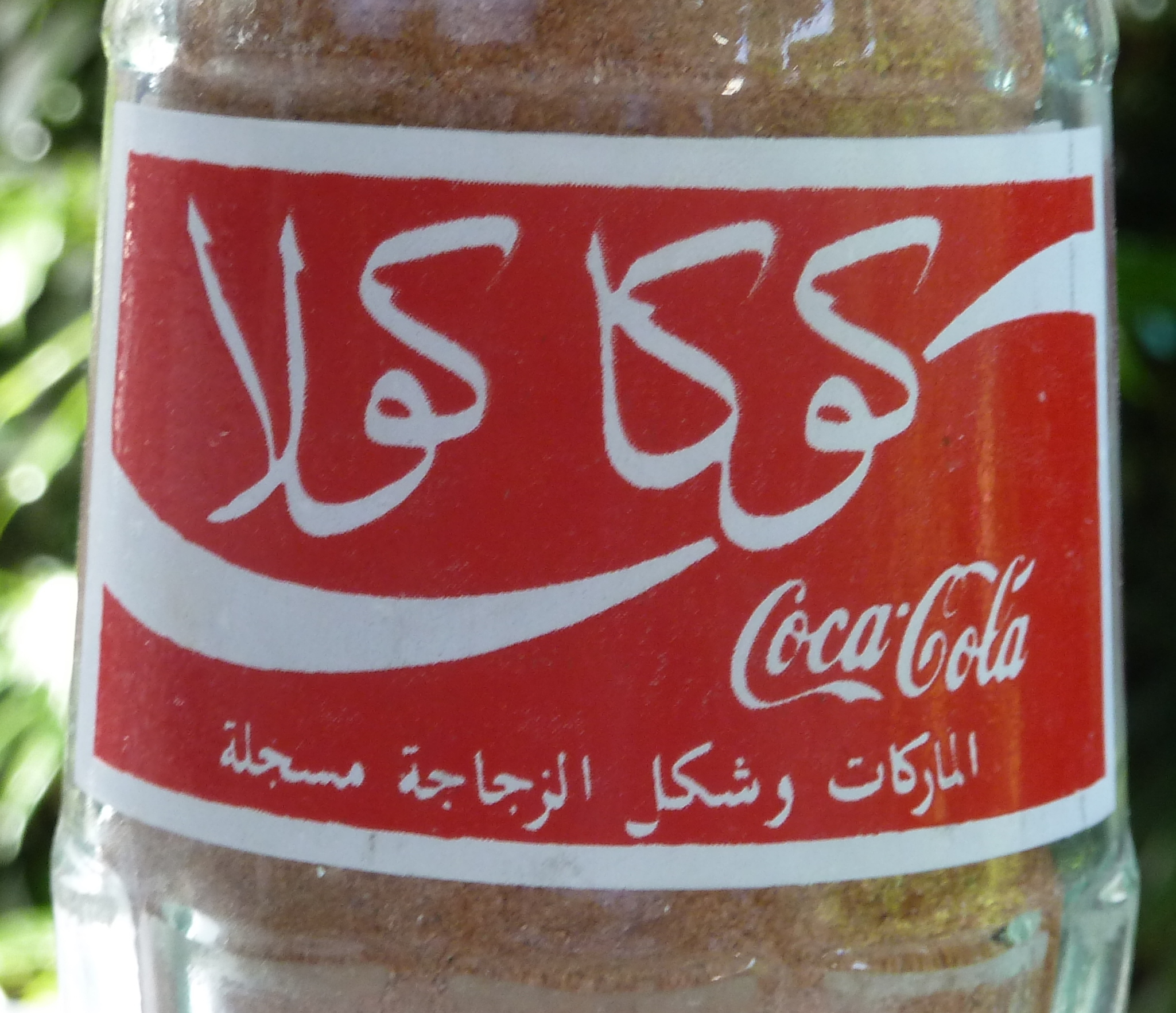

On September 11, 1951, an Egyptian newspaper, al-Ahram, published a fatwa by mufti Hasanayn al-Makhluf ruling Coca-Cola and Pepsi were permissible under Islamic law. The premise of the case was due to rumors and conspiracies spreading among the public, such as the Coca-Cola logo, when reflected in a mirror, spelling out "No Mohammed no Mecca" in Arabic.

== Issuing the fatwa ==
In order to get an accurate answer on whether or not Pepsi and Coca-Cola were prohibited by Islamic law, the Egyptian Department of Fatwas asked the Ministry of Public Health to ascertain the composition of the two sodas. On August 25, 1951, the Ministry of Public Health found that neither Pepsi-Cola nor Coca-Cola contained any narcotics, alcohol, or pepsin. The use of narcotics and the consumption of alcohol are both prohibited (haram) under Islamic law. Pepsin is created from the membrane of pig stomachs, and any product coming from a pig is not permitted under Muslim Sharia law. The Ministry of Public Health explained that the drinks also have no harmful microbes in them. Based on the information provided by the Ministry of Public Health, the Department of Fatwas declared the drinks permissible under Islamic law.

Mufti Hasanayn al-Makhluf also explained in this fatwa that all foods and drinks are assumed to be permissible under Islamic law unless found otherwise and if a person does not know the condition or ingredients of a food or beverage, its consumption is permitted until its nature is determined.

== See also ==
- List of fatwas
