= Harold Hirsch =

American football player and lawyer (1881–1939)

- Born: October 19, 1881
- Died: September 25, 1939 (aged 57)
- Education: University of Georgia; Columbia University
- Known for: General Counsel for The Coca-Cola Company

Harold D. Hirsch (October 19, 1881 – September 25, 1939) was a student at the University of Georgia from 1898 to 1901 who also played football for his alma mater. After graduation from the University of Georgia, he studied law at Columbia University practiced at Candler, Thomson & Hirsch law firm (today known as Kilpatrick Townsend & Stockton) and served as general counsel for the Coca-Cola Company, serving in that capacity for more than thirty years.

Hirsch was the co-developer of the unique shape of the iconic Coca-Cola bottle and its logo in 1913 with Earl Dean. In 1932, a new building was funded and completed for the University of Georgia School of Law that was named "Harold Hirsch Hall" to honor Hirsch for his contributions to the University of Georgia School of Law.
