= Emeline Fairbanks Memorial Library =

- Location within Vigo County, Indiana

General information
- Type: Library
- Architectural style: Beaux Arts
- Location: Terre Haute, Indiana; United States, 222 N. 7th St.
- Coordinates: 39.47032°N 87.40701°W
- Completed: 1906
- Owner: Indiana State University

Design and construction
- Main contractor: Modern Construction Company, Terre Haute

Emeline Fairbanks Memorial Library is located in Terre Haute, Indiana. It was built in 1906 by the Modern Construction Company of Terre Haute. The building is in the Beaux Arts architectural style.

The Emeline Fairbanks Memorial Library played an important role in Coca-Cola history. In June 1915, Earl R. Dean and T. Clyde Edwards were dispatched to the Emeline Fairbanks Memorial Library to research the ingredients of Coca-Cola. In the Encyclopædia Britannica, Dean came across a picture of a gourd-shaped cocoa pod. Inspiration from this cocoa pod lead Dean to his design of the iconic contour Coca-Cola bottle.

In 1979, the library was acquired by the Indiana State University and would be converted into an art building five years later.
