= ColaLife =

Non-profit organisation

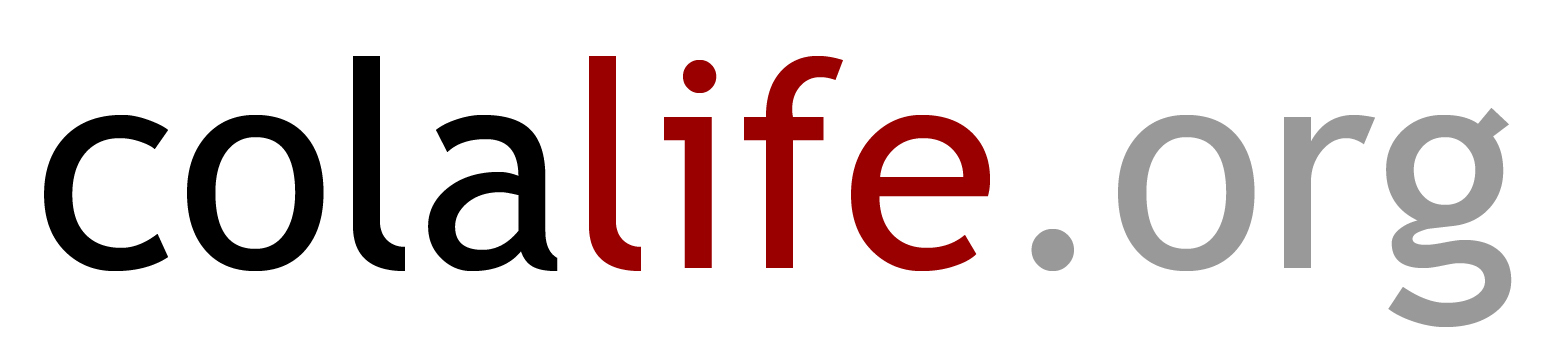
- Formation: 2009
- Type: Registered charity (1142516)
- Headquarters: London, United Kingdom
- Official language: English
- Co-founder: Simon Berry
- Staff: 3
- Volunteers: 10+
- Website: www.colalife.org

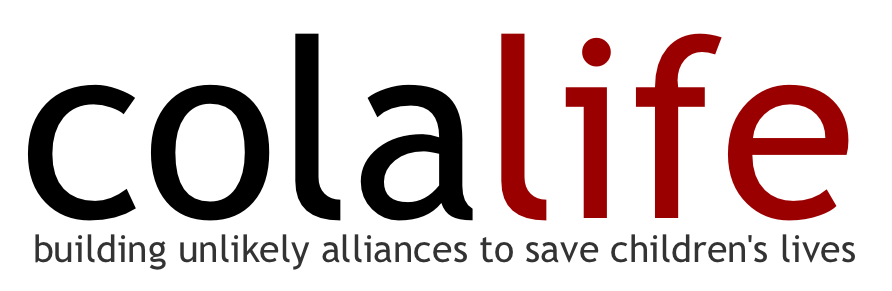
ColaLife logo with strapline

ColaLife is an independent non-profit organisation, which became a registered charity on 21 June 2011 (charity number 1142516). ColaLife's name comes from the following question: “Coca-Cola seems to get everywhere in developing countries, yet life-saving medicines don't. Why?”. ColaLife studied the techniques used by the producers of fast moving consumer goods (FMCGs) to get their products into the hands of people living in remote areas of Africa and applied the same techniques with the aim of improving access to diarrhoea treatment. From May 2008 until the end of 2013, ColaLife received advisory support from The Coca-Cola Company (TCCC) during the planning and implementation of a quasi-experimental design and distribution trial in Zambia to test ColaLife's approach.

ColaLife works through partnerships with local organisations in each country to help them to adapt and adopt ColaLife's approach. The organisation is not affiliated to The Coca-Cola Company (TCCC) or any other organisation and its work with others does not imply an endorsement of any product or brand.

== History ==
=== 1988 - 2008 ===
In 1988, Simon Berry was working on the British Aid Programme in northeast Zambia, conscious that while he could buy a bottle of Coke anywhere, one in every five children under the age of five died in these areas through simple causes such as dehydration through diarrhea. So he had the idea that Coca-Cola's distribution muscle could be used to distribute oral rehydration salts in developing countries. At that time, with only a telex machine available, he struggled to get any attention for his idea.

=== 2008 - mid-2010 ===
In 2008 Coca-Cola's participation at the Business Call To Action event re-kindled the idea. The active work for Cola Life was started with a first blog post in the [ founder's personal Blog. This Blog post did not attract Coca-Cola's attention, so Berry decided to try to get the idea debated on the BBC Radio 4 programme, iPM.

In parallel, the first attempts to communicate with Coca-Cola failed, because it was not possible to get past the first line in Coca-Cola's CSR department. Social media technologies such as Facebook, Flickr and Twitter, helped get more people behind the idea quickly.

On 21 May 2008 Berry was interviewed by Eddie Mair for the iPM Programme. The interview was broadcast on 24 May. Three days before the broadcast, the iPM team received a written statement from Coca-Cola's then Global Director for Stakeholder Relations, Salvatore Gabola, that he would "be happy to have a chat on this subject with Simon in the near future". Eddie Mair coined the term Aidpod in his interview with Simon Berry broadcast on 27 Dec 2008 to describe the container containing medicine that fitted between the necks of the bottles in Coca-Cola crates.

This was the start of an ongoing relationship between the ColaLife campaign and TCCC. Since this first contact with TCCC and the first report about ColaLife on the BBC, the campaign has won supporters from all around the world. In August 2009 Simon Berry and Jane Berry co-founded ColaLife as a Company Limited by Guarantee.

=== mid-2010 - 2013 ===
In 2010, ColaLife's co-founders (Simon Berry and his wife Jane Berry) decided to work full-time for ColaLife to move it from a campaign into a trial phase. They short-listed five countries where they considered a trial would be feasible and Zambia was among these. They first visited Zambia in October 2010 to gauge interest amongst local actors including Zambia's Ministry of Health. Interest was high and two further visits were undertaken in January and May 2011 when a trial plan was finalised and agreed upon with local partners.

On 21 June 2011 ColaLife was granted Charity status (charity number 1142516). The co-founders resigned as Directors and handed control to four trustees, subsequently increasing to five.

During the same period, the ColaLife co-founders were invited to join Johnson & Johnson’s internal Innovation Boot Camp. Here they received training and mentoring from Johnson & Johnson staff and personnel from the Antwerp Management School. This culminated in an award of $250,000 from the Johnson & Johnson Corporate Citizenship Trust (JJCCT) towards the cost of the proposed trial.

In October 2011 the ColaLife co-founders moved to Zambia and in November 2011 the UK’s Department for International Development (DfID) agreed to provide the remaining funding to run the trial.

The nine-month set-up phase for the trial began in December 2011. During this period the design of the diarrhoea treatment kit was finalised in consultation with caregivers. The kit was branded Kit Yamoyo, meaning Kit of Life in local languages. It won the Design Museum’s ‘Product Design of the Year’ in 2013.

The trial started in August 2012 and ran until September 2013. The trial was commissioned by UNICEF Zambia and the Principal Investigator was Dr Rohit Ramchandani then a DrPH Candidate at Johns Hopkins School of Public Health. Rohit Ramchandani contacted the founders in April 2010, offering his services, voluntarily in the first instance. Doctor Ramchandani has gone on to publish the key trial findings.

The results of the trial were published by the UK's Department for International Development, a co-funder of the trial. In the 12 months of the trial, retailers serving the 2 implementation districts, remote rural communities, bought 26,000 diarrhoea treatment kits. Diarrhoea treatment rates with Oral Rehydration Salts (ORS) and Zinc increased from less than 1% to 46% and the distance caregivers had to travel to access the medicine was reduced by two thirds (from 7.3 km to 2.4 km). The full results were published in Dr Ramchandani's DrPH thesis which was successfully defended in December 2015.

Both DfID and JJCCT provided limited transitional funding from the end of the trial (Dec 2013) until 2014 while ColaLife sought funding to scale-up the approach in Zambia.

=== 2014 - date ===
After failing to raise funding for a nationwide scale-up in Zambia, Cola Life and its local partner – Keepers Zambia Foundation – changed strategy and bid for funding under sub-national programmes.

In February 2015 scale-up work started in the 14 most nutritionally challenged districts in Zambia under Zambia's Scaling Up Nutrition (SUN) programme. In 5 of these districts the project works with small retailers. Eleven districts are being supplied with a public sector ORS/Zinc co-pack, based on the Kit Yamoyo design. This is being given away free through hospitals and clinics.

In October 2015 scale-up work started in Lusaka Province with ColaLife deploying its Healthcare Innovation Award from GSK and Save the Children, match-funding the UK Government's UK AID Direct Programme.

In December 2015 Zambia's largest supermarket chain, Shop rite, started stocking Kit Yamoyo in their 26 stores nationwide. Shoprite has subsequently expanded to 30 stores. In April 2016 ColaLife was accepted into the Ashoka Globalizer programme and in October 2016 presented its plan to spread its social impact beyond Zambia.

== Selected awards ==
Year	Description	Comment
2015	The UK Packaging Awards	Winner: 'Resource Efficient Pack of the Year'
2015	INDEX: Award 2015 (Designs to improve life)	Finalist with honourable mention
2014	GSK and Save the Children Fund	Winner
2014	FT/IFC Transformational Business Award (Health)	Winner
2013	Business is Great (Innovation)	Elected as a Great British Innovation
2013	Innovation by Design Award	Winner - Social Good Category
2013	Breakthrough Innovation for Child Health (UN)	One of 10 innovations showcased at the UN General Assembly
2013	Observer Ethical Awards	Winner - Products and Services
2013	25th DuPont Packaging Awards	Overall winner (Diamond Award)
2013	Product Design of the Year 2013 (Design Museum)	Winner
2011	Making More Health Award	Winner
2010	Buckminster Fuller Challenge	One of 30 semi-finalists and selected for the Ideas Bank
2010	UnLtd Award for Social Entrepreneurs	Awarded £15,000 towards living expenses to work full-time to move ColaLife to the implementation phase
