= Coca-Cola Raspberry =

Cola soft drink

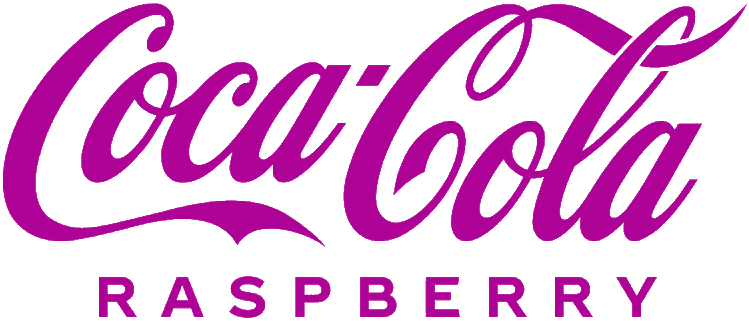

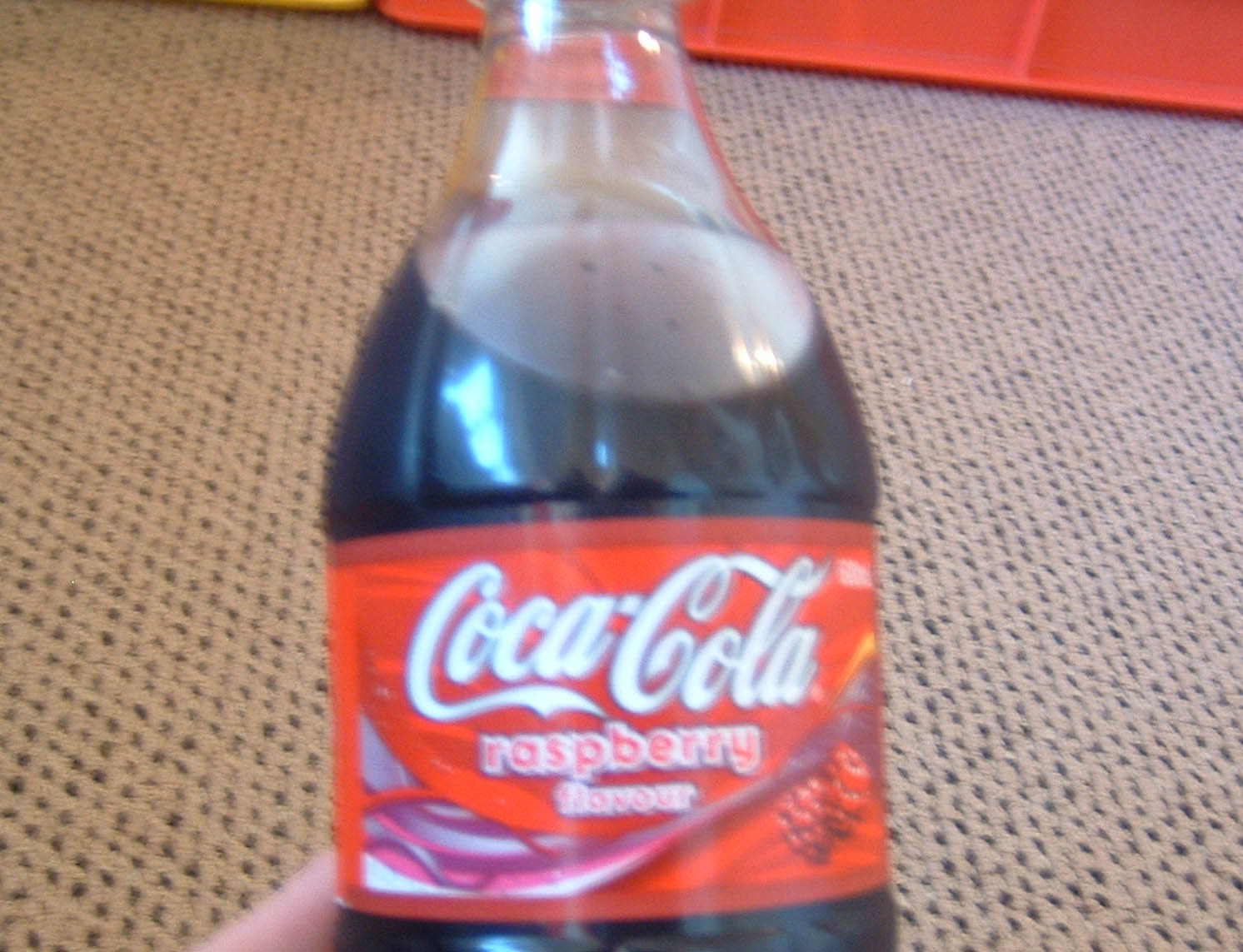
- Coca-Cola Raspberry from New Zealand, 2005
- Type: Raspberry flavored Cola
- Manufacturer: The Coca-Cola Company
- Origin: New Zealand
- Introduced: 2005; 21 years ago
- Variants: Coca-Cola California Raspberry; Diet Coke Raspberry; Coca-Cola Zero Sugar Raspberry
- Related products: Coca-Cola Cherry, Black Cherry Vanilla Coca-Cola

Coca-Cola Raspberry, Diet Coke Raspberry and Coca-Cola Zero Sugar Raspberry are variants of the Coca-Cola drink with a raspberry flavor, produced by The Coca-Cola Company and its bottlers.

== Regular version ==
On 20 April 2005, Coca-Cola Amatil announced the launch of Coca-Cola Raspberry for a release on June 1 in New Zealand for a limited time. It was the third Coca-Cola flavour to be released in New Zealand after Cherry Coke and Vanilla Coke. It was sold until the end of the year, and was released in Fiji the following year.

The drink made its American debut as a selectable choice on the new Coca-Cola Freestyle soda fountains in 2009, although this variant of the drink, like all Coca-Cola flavours, is simply flavour syrup added into regular Coca-Cola.

On 26 October 2017, Coca-Cola Amatil announced that the drink would return to New Zealand for the 2017-2018 summer season. This version of the drink utilized a different formula from the 2005 incarnation, containing the artificial sweeteners Sucrolose and Acesulfame-K that would allow the drink to have 25% less sugar than standard Coca-Cola. The drink was introduced into Australia as well, with the same formula and was available till 2019.

A similar variant, Coca-Cola California Raspberry, was introduced in the United States in 2018 as a natural, home-produced product sweetened with cane sugar.

== Diet version ==
A Diet Coke Raspberry variant was also produced and sold at the same time as the standard variety in New Zealand in 2005.

== Zero Sugar version ==
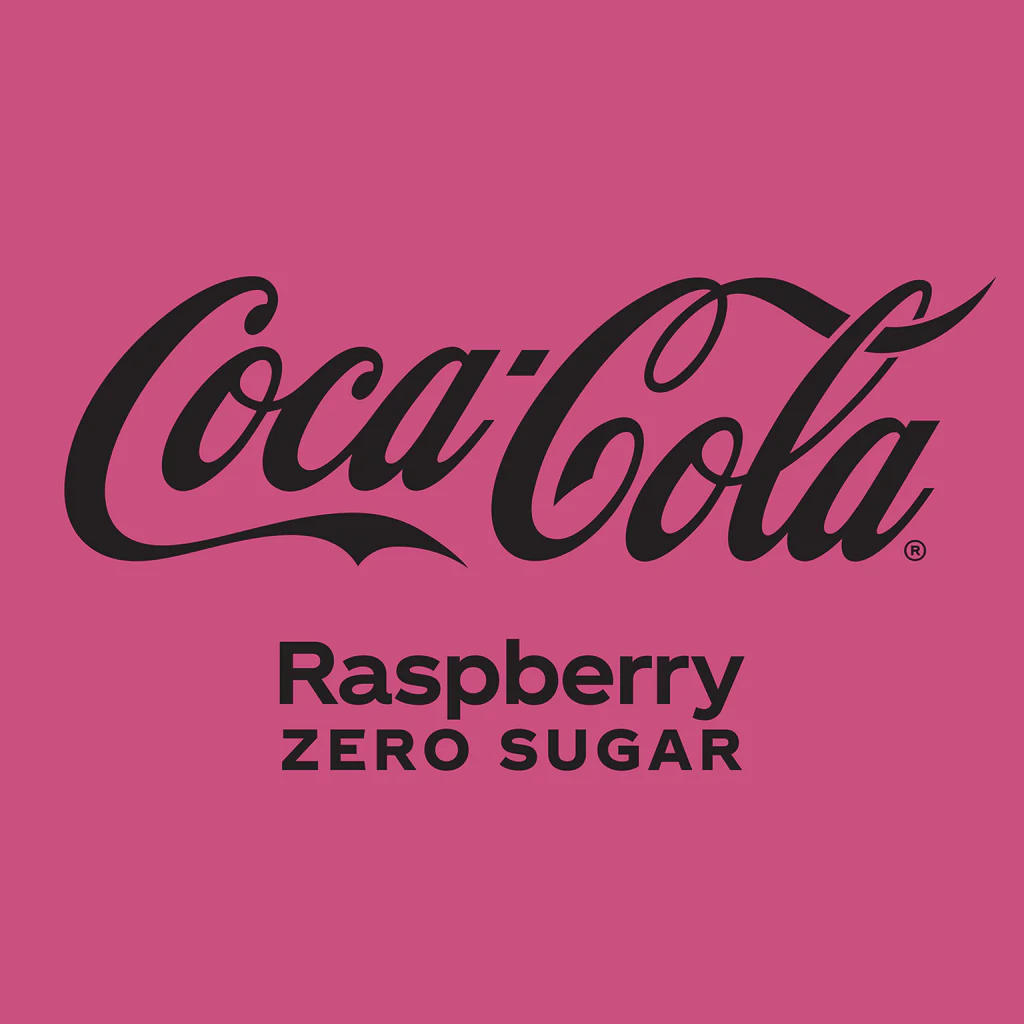
Logo of Coca-Cola Zero Sugar Raspberry

A Coca-Cola Zero Sugar Raspberry variant was first released in August 2018 in Finland and Norway. This flavor was further launched in Great Britain and Denmark in January 2019. Its Danish marketed name was Coca-Cola Hindbær. In January 2020 the drink launched in Sweden, and has since also launched in the Netherlands in April 2021, Belgium, Taiwan, and in Australia in March 2023.

== See also ==
- Coca-Cola Cherry
- Coca-Cola Spiced
