= Coca-Cola Spiced =

Discontinued Coca-Cola flavor

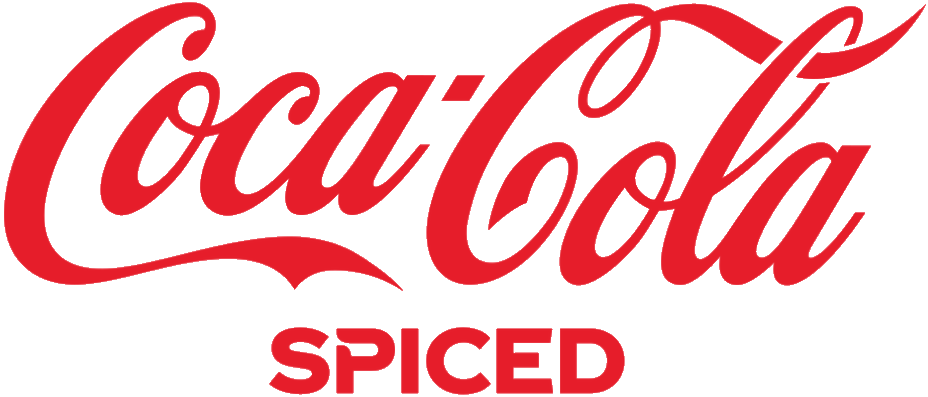
- Type: Cola
- Manufacturer: The Coca-Cola Company
- Introduced: February 2024; 1 year ago
- Ingredients: Raspberry; Spice
- Variants: Zero Sugar

Coca-Cola Spiced is a variation of the Coca-Cola cola drink, produced by The Coca-Cola Company between 2024 and 2025, consisting of raspberry and spiced flavors.

Launched in February 2024, Coca-Cola Spiced was intended to be the first permanent drink Coca-Cola launched since 2020 in North America, being released in both regular/classic Coca-Cola and Zero Sugar variants. Coca-Cola created the drink in an attempt to bring in the "next generation" of consumers. Company research had found that consumers selected raspberry on its Freestyle drink machines more than 5 million times in 2022.

Commercially the drink failed to reach the company's targets. A review from Mashed.com claimed that "the complete and utter lack of authentic spice found in Coke Spiced is an immense letdown." In September 2024, The Coca-Cola Company announced its plans to discontinue Coca-Cola Spiced, as well as Coca-Cola Cherry Vanilla, by no later than late 2025.

== See also ==
- Coca-Cola Raspberry
