= Oreo Coca-Cola =

Soft Drink

- Type: Cola
- Manufacturer: The Coca-Cola Company
- Introduced: September 2024
- Color: Caramel
- Flavor: Oreo
- Related products: Coca-Cola, Oreo

Coca-Cola Oreo Zero Sugar was a limited-edition flavor of Coca-Cola Zero Sugar created by The Coca-Cola Company in collaboration with Mondelez International's Oreo brand, as part of the Coca-Cola Creations brand. It sold for a limited time from September 2024 in Canada, the US, Australia, and a number of countries in Asia and Europe. The drink received mixed reviews upon release.

The drink was sold alongside a line of Coca-Cola-flavored Oreo cookies. The cookies featured one black cookie bearing the Oreo logo, one red cookie featuring Coca-Cola iconography, and white creme containing red popping candy.

The partnership, known as "Besties", also featured a limited promotion on Spotify, allowing users to combine their music tastes and discover new artists in a collaborative playlist, with the campaign being promoted with the tagline "Unlock Bestie Mode" in online print and audio advertisements.

== History ==
Oreo Coke was announced in early August 2024 and was released in September 2024 in 35 countries including Brazil, Mexico, Great Britain and China. Within a few months it had largely disappeared from stores worldwide. It was the twelfth release of the Creations lineup.

== Marketing ==
The "Besties" Marketing campaign generated 75 million impressions across 8 different social media sites over the months preceding and following the drink's release. Global Vice-President of The Coca-Cola Company's brand strategy Oana Vlad said about the collaboration "As a first-of-its-kind collaboration for both brands, we are thrilled for besties around the world to join us in celebrating new products, great experiences and unexpected moments of connection."

The two brands also collaborated with Spotify, with a custom playlist being added to the site allowing users to combine their music tastes with their "Bestie" to compare music tastes and discover new artists in a shared playlist.
