= Coca-Cola Creations =

Limited-edition Coca-Cola flavors

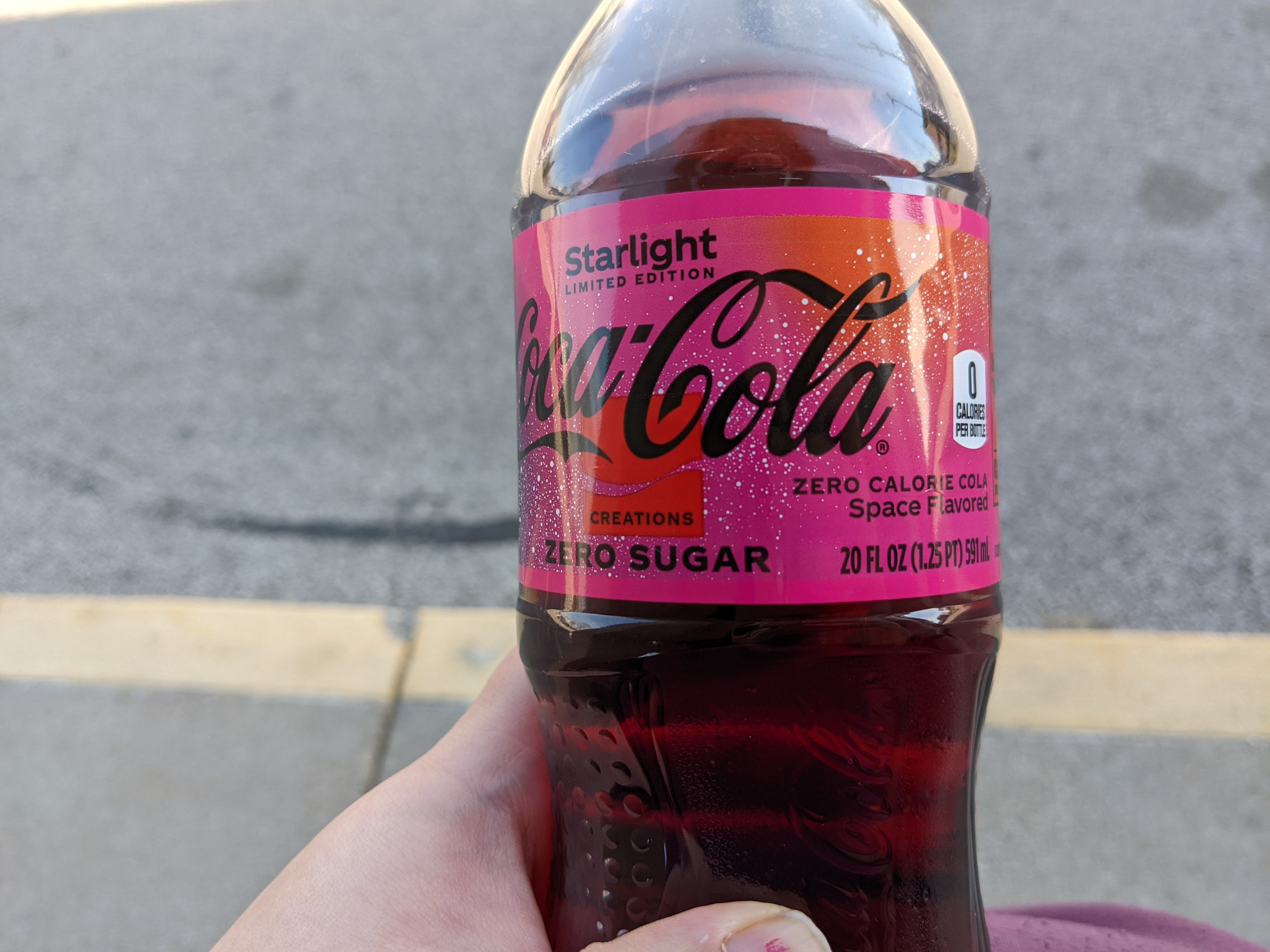
- A bottle of Coca-Cola Starlight
- Type: Cola
- Manufacturer: The Coca-Cola Company
- Origin: United States
- Introduced: February 21, 2022
- Variants: Starlight, Byte, Marshmello, Dreamworld, Soul Blast, Move, Ultimate, Y3000, Happy Tears, K-Wave, Wozzaah, Oreo
- Related products: Coca-Cola

Coca-Cola Creations is a series of limited edition variants of Coca-Cola. The flavors use non-traditional branding designed to appeal to younger consumers, and a focus on digital marketing and augmented reality experiences. The brand launched in February 2022 with Coca-Cola Starlight, a "space flavored" cola.

== Variants ==
=== Starlight (Space Flavored) ===
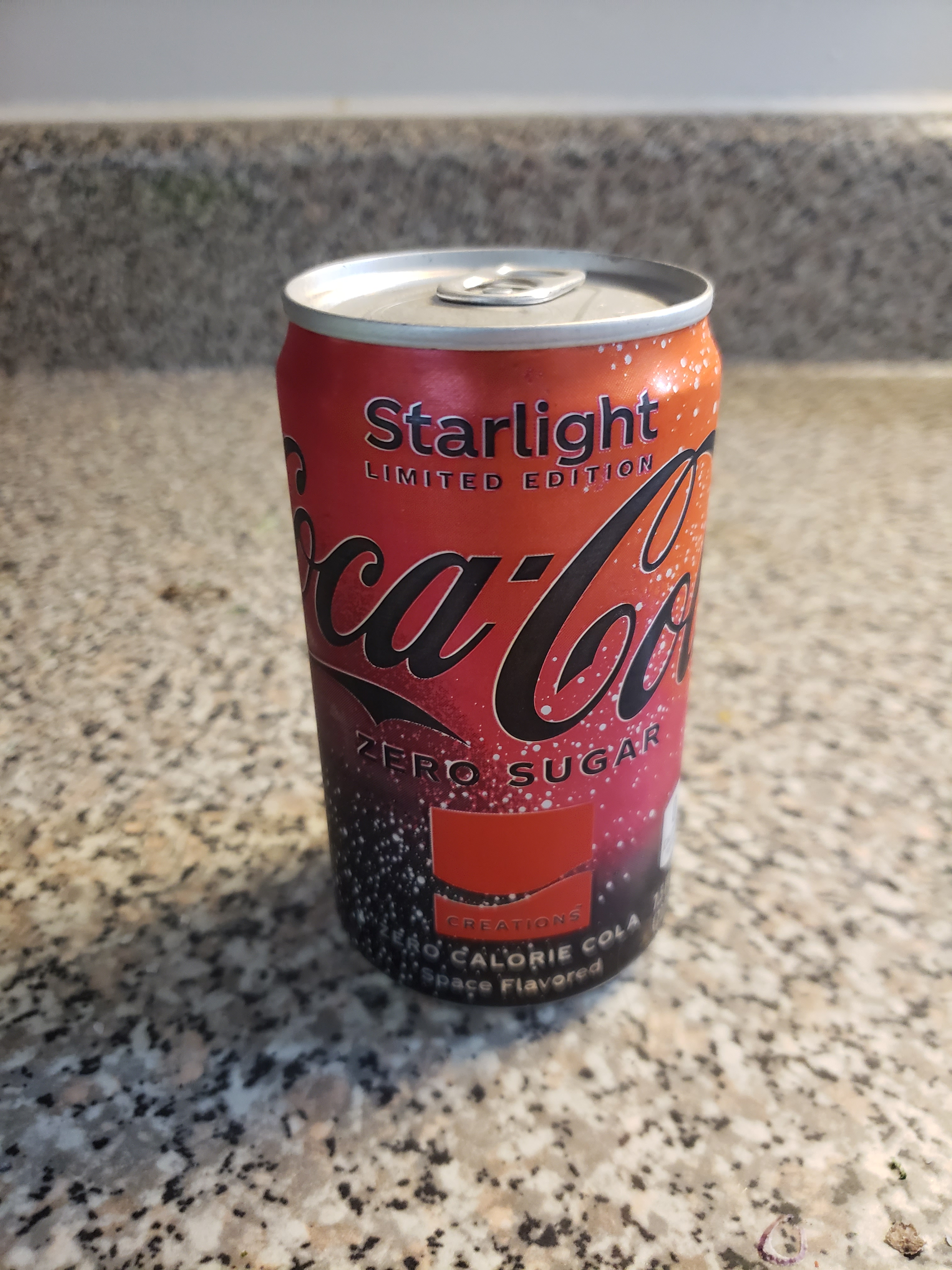
Can of Coca-Cola Starlight

Coca-Cola Starlight (UK: Intergalactic, South Korea: Stardust, Thailand: Starshine) was a limited-edition "Space Flavored" variant of Coca-Cola and Coca-Cola Zero Sugar. It released in North America on February 21, 2022 as the first in the Creations line. The beverage featured a reddish hue and a flavor "inspired by space", the company saying that it was intended to evoke "stargazing around a campfire" and "the feeling of a cold journey to space". It was discontinued on August 1, 2022.

Many compared the flavor to that of fruit, vanilla or cotton candy. Review site Candy Hunting said it "tastes like strawberry, marshmallow, and/or cotton candy". Aly Walansky of Food Network wrote it tastes "kind of like minty cotton candy sprinkled with vanilla".

Coca-Cola Starlight returned in July 2025 exclusively at Jack in the Box as part of their Starlight Munchie Meal combo. It did not have the Creations branding in its return.

=== Byte (Pixel Flavored) ===
Coca-Cola Zero Sugar Byte, a "gaming-inspired" flavor "born in the metaverse", was launched in April 2022 and sold exclusively online. The Verge reviewer Mitchell Clark described it as "sickly sweet" and his wife compared it to Red Bull.

=== Marshmello ===
In June 2022 the company launched a flavor in collaboration with artist Marshmello, officially called Marshmello’s Limited Edition Coca‑Cola. It had "strawberry and watermelon flavors".

=== Dreamworld (Dream Flavored) ===
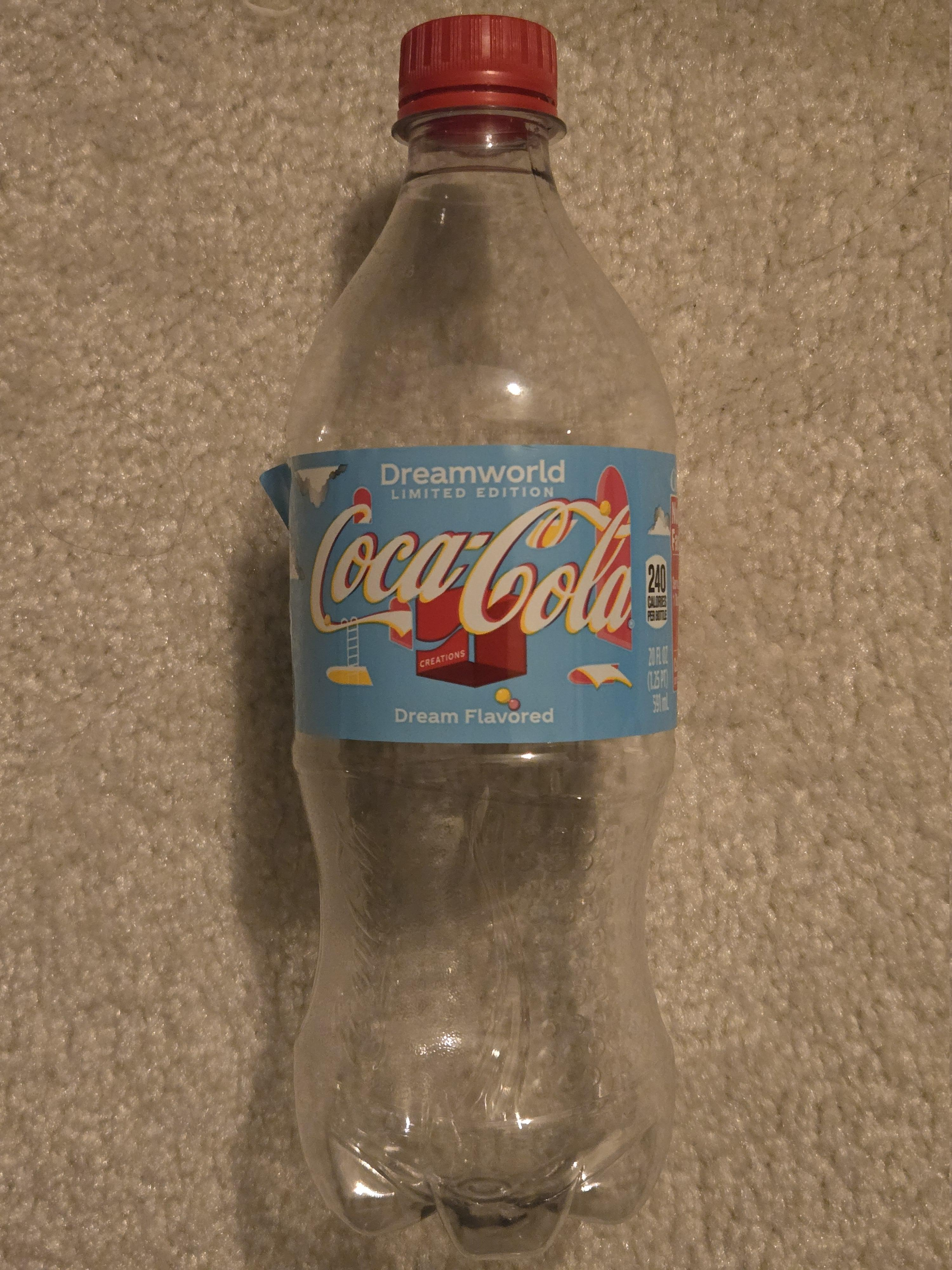
A bottle of Coca-Cola Dreamworld

Coca-Cola Dreamworld was launched in August 2022 and was described as tapping into "Gen Z’s passion for the infinite potential of the mind by exploring what a dream tastes like."

=== Soul Blast (Action Flavored) ===
Coca-Cola Zero Sugar Soul Blast was launched exclusively in Japan, China, and Taiwan in October 2022 alongside Bleach: Thousand-Year Blood War.

=== Move (Transformation Flavored) ===
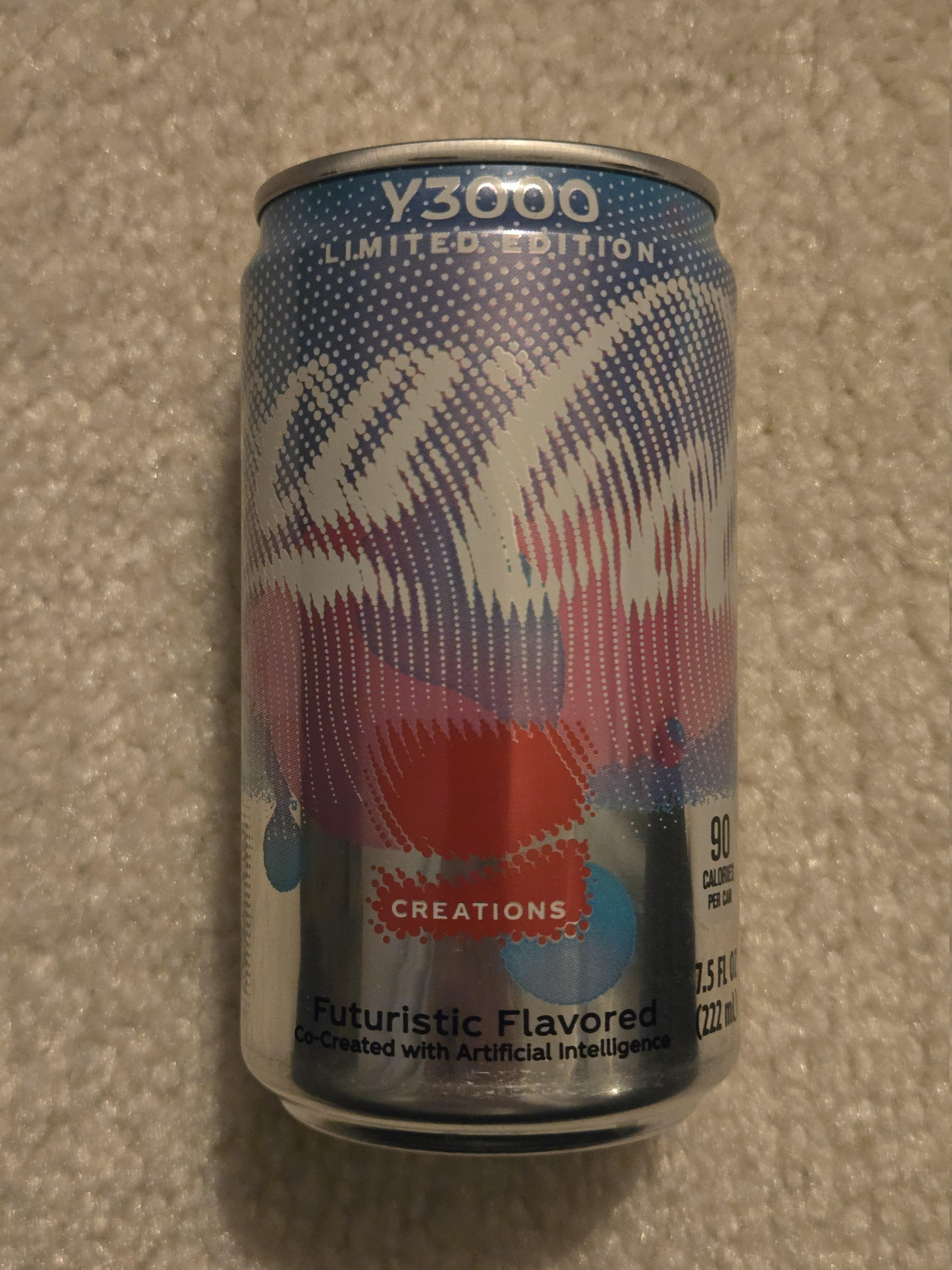
A can of Coca-Cola Y3000

Coca-Cola Move launched in February 2023, in collaboration with Spanish singer Rosalía.

=== Ultimate (+XP Flavored) ===
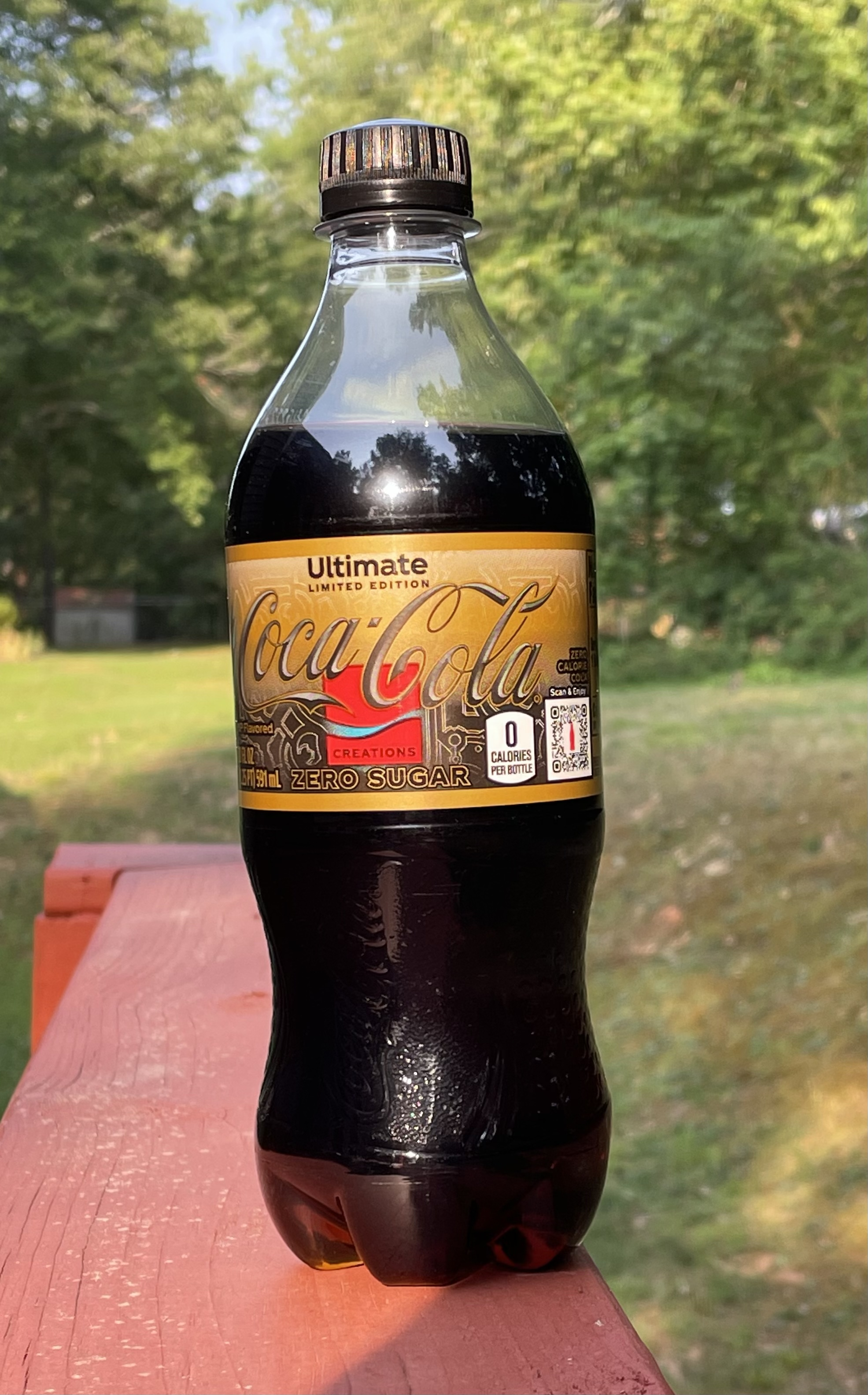
A bottle of Coca-Cola Ultimate, in Zero Sugar

Coca-Cola Ultimate was launched on June 10, 2023, in collaboration with League of Legends developer Riot Games. It was sold in Turkey, China, the United States, Egypt, Brazil, Canada.

=== Y3000 (Futuristic Flavored) ===
Coca-Cola Y3000 was launched in September 2023 and was "co-created with artificial intelligence". It is sold in the USA, Canada, Argentina, Australia, China, Kazakhstan, Georgia, South Africa, Hungary, and Turkey.

=== Happy Tears ===
Coca-Cola Happy Tears Zero Sugar launched on February 17, 2024, exclusively on the TikTok Shop in USA and Great Britain to celebrate Random Acts of Kindness Day. The soft drink's flavor was described by the company as a combination of the "timeless Coke taste infused with a salty splash of minerals for taste and a sweet pinch of peach".

=== K-Wave (Fruity Fantasy Flavored) ===
Coca‑Cola K-Wave Zero Sugar launched on February 20, 2024.

=== Wozzaah (Tropical Blaze Flavored) ===
Coca-Cola Wozzaah was launched on May 23, 2024 to coincide with Africa Day, and was exclusive to select markets including Nigeria, Algeria, South Africa and Morocco.

=== Oreo (Fizzy Cookie Flavored) ===
Coca-Cola Zero Sugar Oreo was launched on September 9, 2024 in partnership with Oreo. It is an Oreo-flavored Coca-Cola. Oreo simultaneously released Coke flavoured cookies because of the collaboration.
