= Coca-Cola Orange =

Variation of Coca-Cola

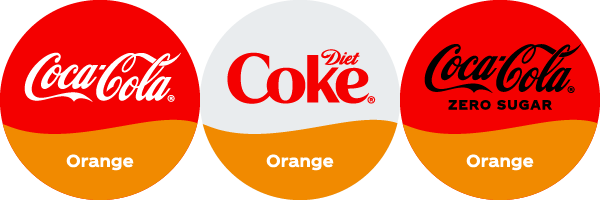
- Logos as they appear on Coca-Cola Freestyle machines

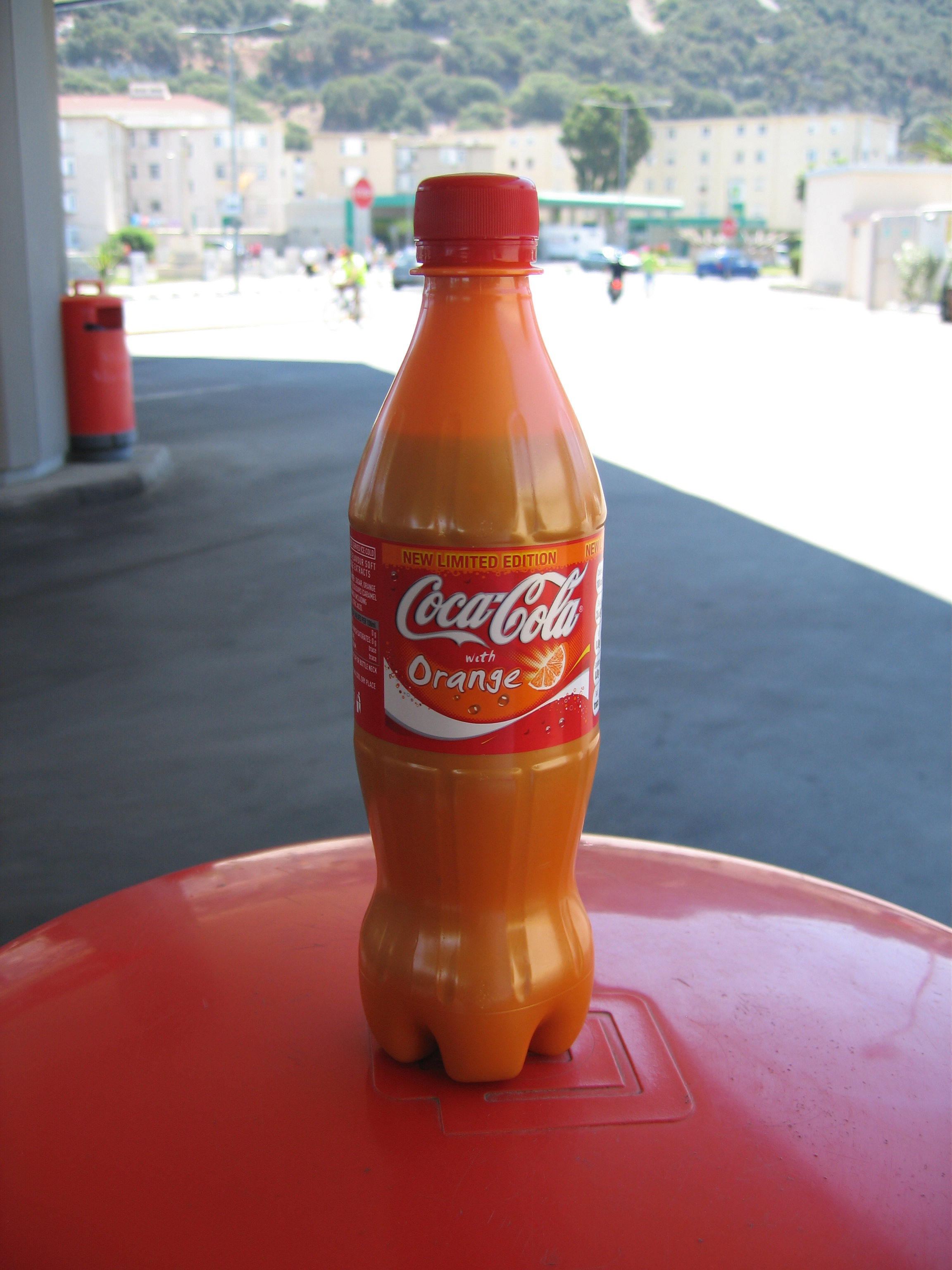
- Bottle of Coca-Cola with Orange sold in Gibraltar (2007)
- Type: Cola
- Manufacturer: The Coca-Cola Company
- Introduced: 2007
- Color: Orange
- Flavor: Orange
- Variants: Coca-Cola Zero Sugar Orange
- Related products: Coca-Cola Light Sango; Coca-Cola Orange Vanilla; Coca-Cola Orange Creme

Coca-Cola Orange is a variation of Coca-Cola with orange flavoring. It is available on Coca-Cola Freestyle machines and has been released bottled periodically as limited editions in a number of markets, including in Coca-Cola Zero Sugar formulation.

Before orange-flavored Coca-Cola was first launched in 2007 (although technically Coca-Cola Light Sango was the first orange-flavored cola), The Coca-Cola Company had already been selling the Mezzo Mix beverage in Germany since the 1970s, a drink with a similar formula to Coca-Cola Orange. It is available outside the Germany/Austria region on Freestyle fountains.

== Regular version ==
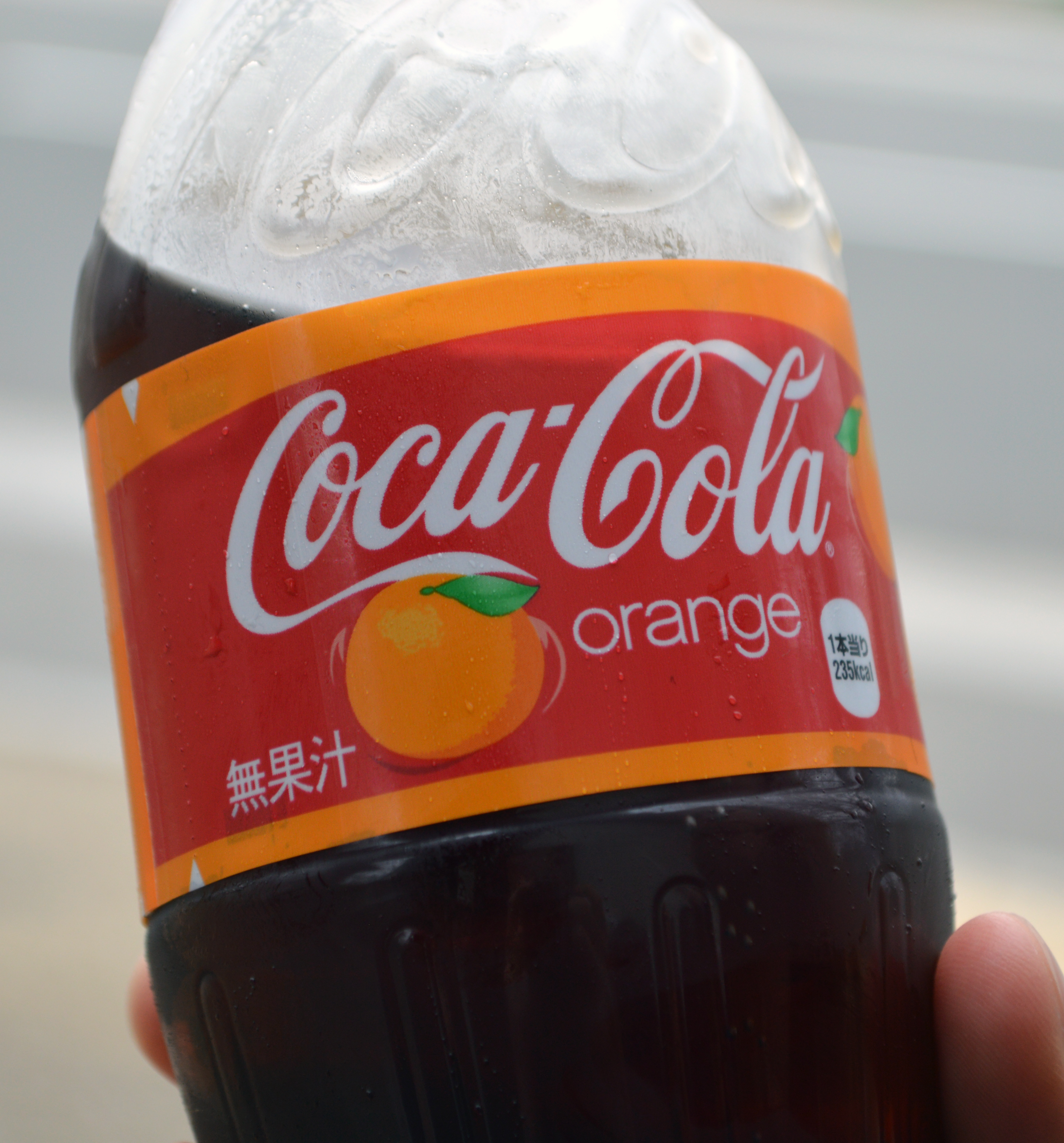
Japanese Coca-Cola Orange, 2016

Coca-Cola with Orange was originally introduced as a limited edition drink in the Great Britain and Gibraltar markets in July 2007, following the success of the previous year's Coca-Cola with Lime, for which 40% of the launch sales represented new customers and increased purchasing. It was sold in 330ml cans, 500ml and 2 liter bottles. It listed "orange fruit from concentrate (1%)" in the ingredients.

Afterwards the flavor became available on Freestyle fountains. There have also been unverified claims that Orange was available in Russia and the Baltics. Coca-Cola Orange then went on sale as a packaged limited edition product in Japan in November 2014. However one difference with the previous formulation was that the Japanese version contained no actual fruit juice. The drink was then also released (as Coca-Cola Laranja) for a limited time in the first half of 2017 in Brazil as a seasonal product.

== Diet version ==
Diet Coke Orange, a no-calorie and sugarless version based on Diet Coke, is sold through Coca-Cola Freestyle machines in some countries.

== Zero Sugar version ==
A no-calorie, sugarless Orange flavored cola based on Coca-Cola Zero Sugar has also been distributed as limited editions. It launched as Coca-Cola No Sugar Orange in Australia in July 2018, in Thailand in July 2020, in New Zealand in 2020, and in Russia and Belarus in February 2021.

== See also ==
- Coca-Cola Orange Vanilla
