= Coca-Cola Black Cherry Vanilla =

Soft drink

Black Cherry Vanilla cola
- Type: Cherry- and vanilla-flavored cola
- Manufacturer: The Coca-Cola Company
- Origin: USA
- Introduced: 2006; 20 years ago
- Discontinued: 2007; 19 years ago
- Color: Caramel E-150d
- Related products: Coca-Cola Cherry Vanilla, Coca-Cola Vanilla, Coca-Cola Cherry
- Website: Manufacturer Website

Coca-Cola Black Cherry Vanilla and Diet Coke Black Cherry Vanilla are varieties of Coca-Cola that were launched in January 2006 by The Coca-Cola Company in United States. The diet version was sweetened with a blend of aspartame and acesulfame potassium and was marketed as part of the Diet Coke family. It was available in 20-ounce, 2-liter, and 12-pack can forms.

The release of this product coincided with the phasing out of Vanilla Coke and its diet counterpart in North America and the renaming of Cherry Coke as Coca-Cola Cherry.

Throughout the first 6 months of the product's sale, the percentage of drinks bought from Coca-Cola and its variants that was Black Cherry Vanilla Coke was 4%, compared to 9% for Coca-Cola with Lime and 3% for Diet Black Cherry Vanilla Coke compared to 7% for Diet Coke with Lime, 13% for the Caffeine free Colas, 13.5% for Coke Cherry and Diet Coke Cherry, and 26% for Diet Coke.

With low sales figures, and the return of Vanilla Coke (now Coca-Cola Vanilla) in the summer of 2007 in the United States, Black Cherry Vanilla Coke was discontinued.

Coca-Cola Freestyle fountains have a variation in the form of Coca-Cola Cherry Vanilla, which would later on be released in cans/bottles in February 2020.
