= Coca-Cola Orange Vanilla =

Variation of Coca-Cola

- Type: Cola
- Manufacturer: The Coca-Cola Company
- Introduced: 2019
- Discontinued: 2022
- Flavor: Orange and vanilla
- Variants: Coca-Cola Zero Sugar Orange Vanilla; Diet Coke Orange Vanilla
- Related products: Coca-Cola Orange; Coca-Cola Orange Creme; Coca-Cola Vanilla
- Website: coca-cola.com/orangevanilla

Coca-Cola Orange Vanilla is a variation of Coca-Cola with orange and vanilla flavoring that launched in 2019. The drink mixes Coca-Cola Orange with Coca-Cola Vanilla.

The drink launched in the United States on February 25, 2019, including a Zero Sugar version, in 12 oz cans and bottles and 20 oz bottles. It was notably the first new flavor based on classic Coca-Cola in more than a decade (at least in the US), since the 2007 relaunch of Coca-Cola Vanilla. The Orange Vanilla product was inspired by the formulation of a limited edition Canadian flavor, Coca-Cola Orange Sorbet, which launched in the summer of 2018. The launch of Coca-Cola Orange Vanilla was accompanied with a large marketing push in America.

In 2020, Coca-Cola Orange Vanilla was also released as limited editions in Japan, Singapore, and in Thailand. The no-sugar version was also marketed as Coca-Cola No Sugar Orange in Croatia.

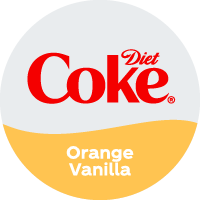
Diet Coke Orange Vanilla logo as it appears on Freestyle machines

In 2022, distribution of the drink was discontinued by Coca-Cola citing challenging supply chain conditions amid COVID-19 pandemic. As of 2025, the flavor continues to be available as Diet Coke Orange Vanilla (based on Diet Coke) on Coca-Cola Freestyle fountains.
