= Coca-Cola Zero Sugar =

Diet soda cola soft drink

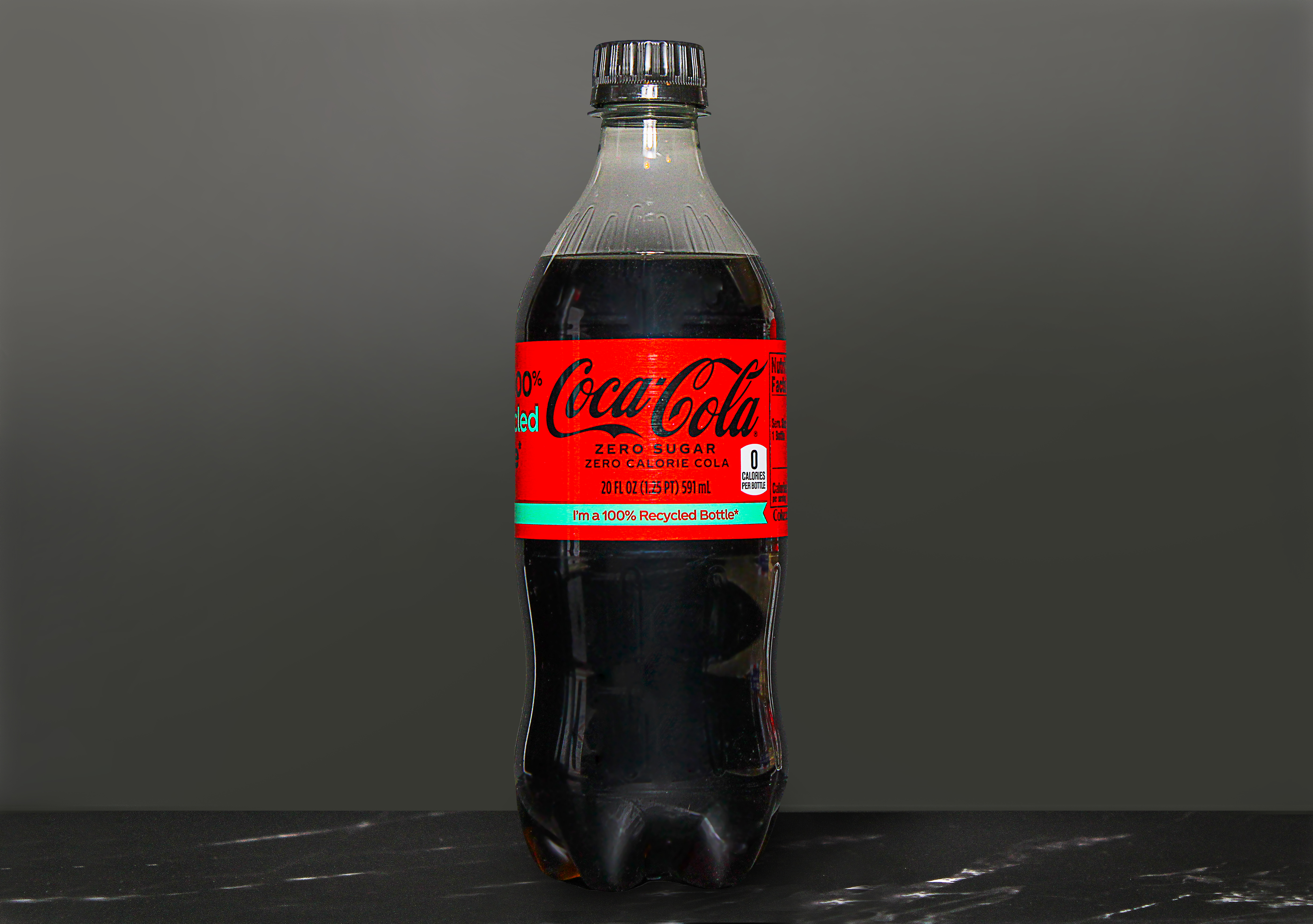
- 20oz bottle of Coke Zero
- Type: Diet cola
- Manufacturer: The Coca-Cola Company
- Origin: United States
- Introduced: June 2005
- Color: Caramel E150d
- Flavor: Cola
- Variants: List: Coca-Cola Zero Cherry; Coca-Cola Zero Vanilla; Coca-Cola Zero Cherry Vanilla; Coca-Cola Zero Lemon; Coca-Cola Zero Lime; Coca-Cola Zero Raspberry; Coca-Cola Zero Peach; Coca-Cola Zero Orange; Coca-Cola Zero Orange Vanilla; Coca-Cola Zero Cinnamon; Caffeine Free Coca-Cola Zero; Coca-Cola Zero Starlight
- Related products: Diet Coke
- Website: coca-cola.com/zero

Coca-Cola Zero Sugar, also known as Coca-Cola No Sugar, commonly known as Coke Zero, is a diet soda produced by the Coca-Cola Company. The drink was introduced in 2005 as Coca-Cola Zero, designed to be a no-calorie equivalent of the company's flagship cola drink, Coca-Cola, with artificial sweeteners in place to imitate the sugar taste. It is distinct from the company's earlier Diet Coke product which was based on an entirely different formula. In 2017, the drink was reformulated and the name changed to Coca-Cola Zero Sugar (with language variations for some regions), and the drink was reformulated again in 2021.

== History ==
Coca-Cola Zero was Coca-Cola's largest product launch in 22 years and was also important because of a dip in standard Coca-Cola sales and lackluster sales of their "mid-calorie" product Coca-Cola C2. The new product was ideated at the Spanish branch, turning Marcos de Quinto into one of the key people of the company. The global campaign was developed by creative agency Crispin Porter + Bogusky. It was marketed as having a taste that is indistinguishable from standard Coca-Cola, as opposed to Diet Coke, which has a different flavor profile.

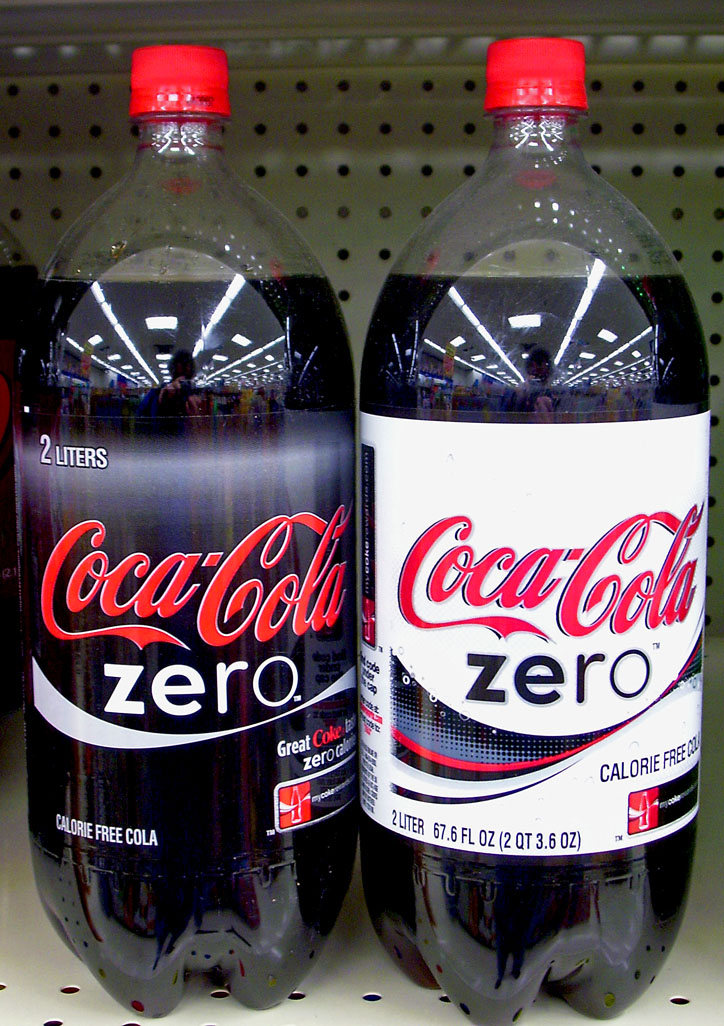
Original white (right) and following black (left) liveries of Coke Zero in 2007

Initially the drink was sold in the United States and Canada and branded in white packaging. However following its successful Australian launch in January 2006 where it used black packaging, the black was then also adopted for all other markets. After its North American and Australian launches, it was released in Spain and then rolled out to further territories around the world.

Beginning in June 2016, Coca-Cola Zero was relaunched in western Europe as Coca-Cola Zero Sugar with a new reformulation, namely in Belgium, France, Great Britain and the Netherlands. The new formula was intended to taste more like standard Coca-Cola while emphasizing the lack of sugar content with the addition of "Sugar" in its full brand name. A year later, in 2017, the Coca-Cola Company announced that the new formula and name will be rolled out in the United States (and in other countries), despite increasing sales of the existing drink there. The announcement caused some vocal backlash from American consumers. The Washington Post noted Coke Zero is very popular, and that fans compared the planned change to the launch of New Coke in 1985. However, Beverage Digest executive editor Duane Stanford noted that it was very similar in flavor, and that the formula likely was tweaked only slightly as the ingredients list is the same. He noted that the rebranding was the main emphasis. In Australia (where it was relaunched as "Coca-Cola No Sugar"), the new soda had trouble gaining initial acceptance but later became more popular.

In July 2018, it was confirmed that the original formula would continue to be sold under the original Coke Zero branding in New Zealand alongside the Coke Zero Sugar product. The original Coke Zero branding was finally phased out in 2022 alongside the local launch of the 2021 reformulation.

In July 2021, the Coca-Cola Company announced that another reformulation of Coca-Cola Zero Sugar would be released throughout the U.S. in August and then throughout Canada in September. The reformulation would be the same recipe that was already available in Europe and Latin America. The company said the recipe would "optimize existing...flavors and existing ingredients" without requiring a change in the listed ingredients or nutritional information. Along with the reformulation, the labeling was updated. Around September 2024, the Coca-Cola Company further adjusted the formulation by adding Stevia.

== Branding and names ==
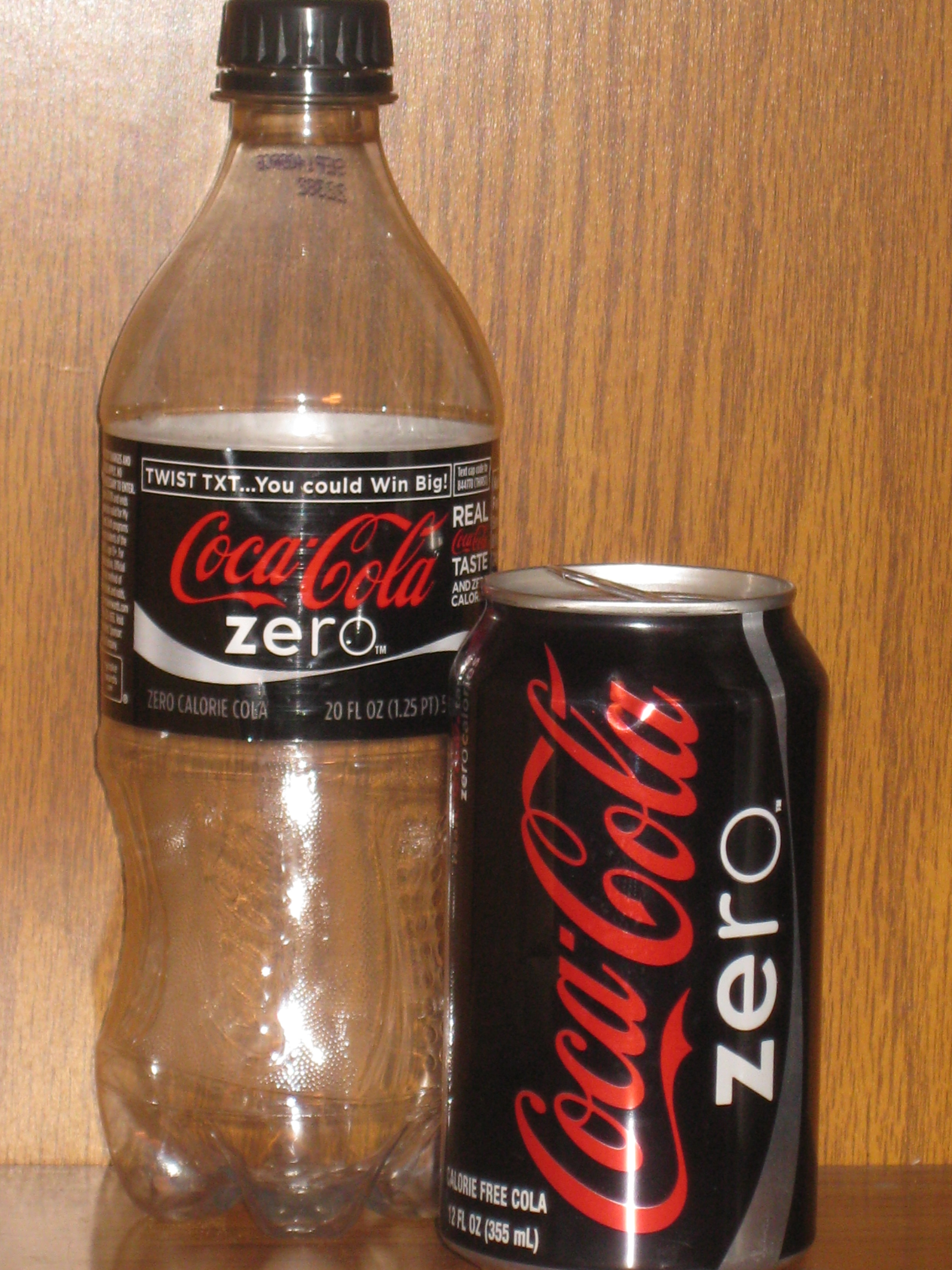
A bottle and can with former "Coca-Cola Zero" branding

Old and new designs

Originally, the Coca-Cola Zero product packaging on cans and bottles consisted of the Coca-Cola logo in red script with white trim, with the word "zero" underneath, on a black background. The font for "zero" was the geometric typeface Avenir (or a customized version of it).

Later packagings, when the product took the name Coca-Cola Zero Sugar, swapped the colors, appearing in a red disc on a black background, as part of the company's "One Brand" wider rebranding to unify the Coca-Cola packagings closer together. In overseas markets, the packaging instead matched the classic Coca-Cola red design with the addition of a black band around the top of the label with the text "zero sugar" (or non-English equivalent). In 2021, after the reformulation, a new livery was introduced featuring the Coca-Cola logo in black against a red background, although the color of the background changes for certain other flavors.

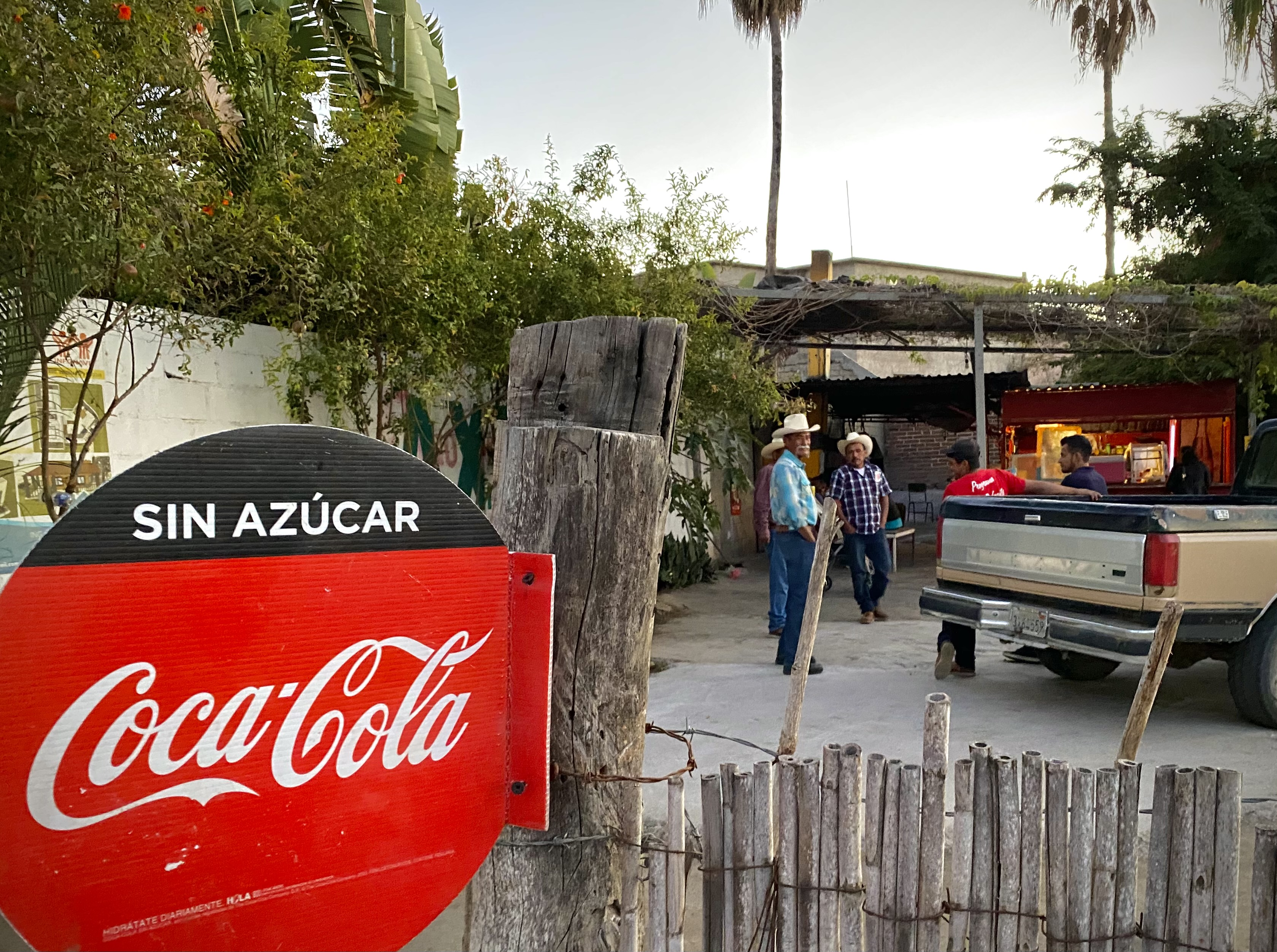
The "black band" 2017 branding (as "Coca-Cola Sin Azúcar") shown on a board in Mexico

With the rebrands and relaunches of Coca-Cola Zero in 2016 and 2017, various names were marketed for the product depending on region. In the United States and many other countries, it was branded as Coca-Cola Zero Sugar. On the other hand, in Australia it was named "Coca-Cola No Sugar", at least until 2023 when it was renamed for this market to match the international English-language name. This name continues to be used in South Africa and Hong Kong.

In many markets the name is translated and branded accordingly. For example in some countries of Latin America it is named "Coca-Cola Sin Azúcar" (which translates into "without sugar") whereas in Spain it is named "Coca-Cola Zero Azúcar", in Brazil as "Coca-Cola Sem Açúcar" and in France as "Coca-Cola Sans Sucres". Similarly in Norway it was branded as "Coca-Cola Uten Sukker" (meaning "without sugar") from launch in 2018 until 2023, when it adopted the "Zero Sugar" name in English. These branding decisions have been made in mind with how customers perceive and understand that the product has no sugar.

== Ingredients ==
=== Listed ingredients ===
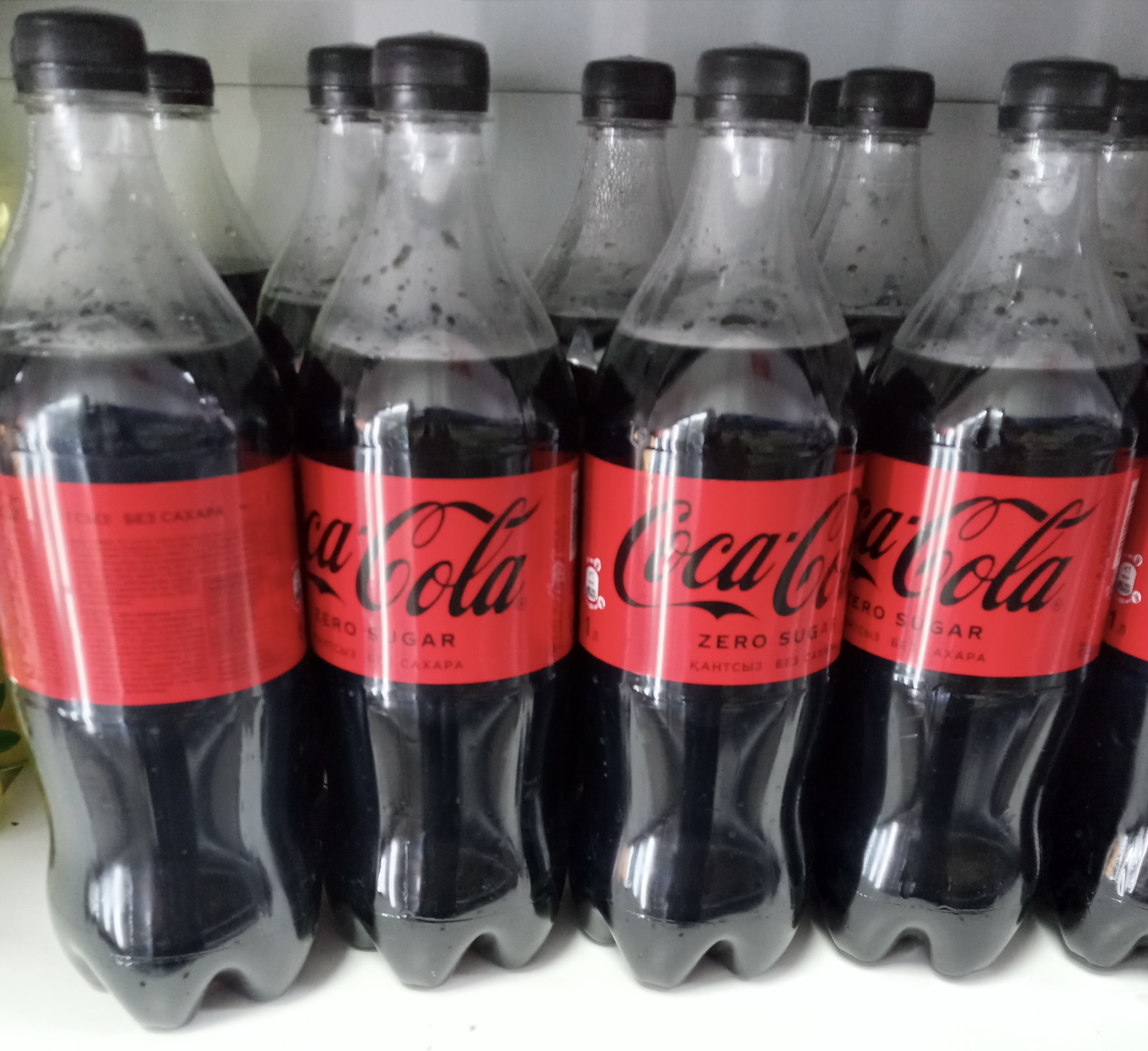
Bottles of Coca-Cola Zero Sugar with current branding since 2021

- Carbonated water
- Caramel color
- Phosphoric acid
- Aspartame
- Potassium benzoate
- Natural flavors
- Caffeine

All versions of Coca-Cola Zero Sugar sold in various countries are based on the same flavoring formula, and all are carbonated. One liter of Coca-Cola Zero Sugar contains 96 mg caffeine. Additionally, artificial sweeteners are used. In the U.S., this includes aspartame and acesulfame potassium. However, the exact combination of sweeteners and preservatives used varies from market to market. Compared to Diet Coke, Coca-Cola Zero Sugar contains less caffeine, and uses acesulfame potassium and aspartame as sweeteners, while Diet Coke uses only aspartame as a sweetener. In addition, Coca-Cola Zero sugar contains potassium citrate, unlike Diet Coke which contains citric acid.

== Marketing ==
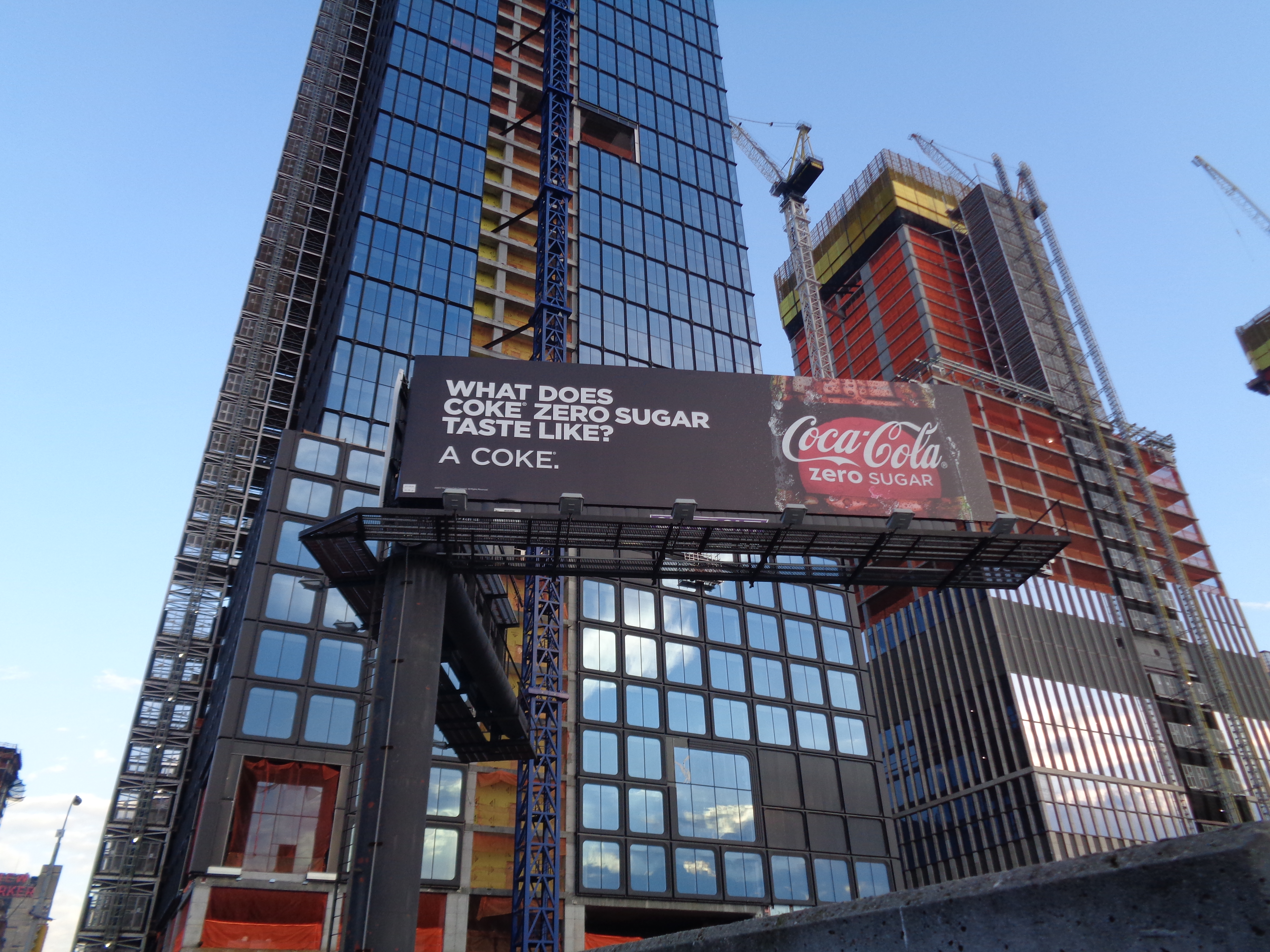
A Coca-Cola Zero Sugar billboard in Hudson Yards, Manhattan in 2017

Coke Zero was originally specifically marketed to men, who are shown to associate "diet" drinks with women, and therefore was primarily marketed towards young adult males. In the US, advertising for Coca-Cola Zero has been tailored to its targeted market by describing the drink as "calorie-free" rather than "diet", since young adult males are said to associate diet drinks with women. This same approach was previously taken by Coca-Cola's rival which introduced Pepsi Max in 1993 as a diet soda but marketing to males. In 2007, the male-oriented advertising was dropped in favor of the tagline "Great taste, zero sugar."

US marketing also emphasized its similarity in taste to sugared Coca-Cola; an advertising campaign for the beverage focused on Coca-Cola executives who were so angry over the drinks' similarities, they were considering suing their co-workers for "taste infringement". Continuing the theme, a Coca-Cola Zero ad aired during Super Bowl XLIII parodied Coke's iconic "Hey Kid, Catch!" commercial, which is interrupted by two Coca-Cola "brand managers" accusing Troy Polamalu of "stealing" their commercial.

In Australia, the product's launch was promoted by a fake front group; the campaign included outdoor graffiti and online spamming that mentioned a fake blog. Once exposed, consumer advocates assailed the campaign as misleading and established the Zero Coke Movement to comment on the ethics of Coke's activities.

Coca-Cola Zero sponsors Bundesliga club Borussia Dortmund, the NASCAR Cup Series Coke Zero Sugar 400 at Daytona International Speedway in August, and also the Suzuka 8 Hours in Japan, a motorcycle endurance race.

In 2013, Coca-Cola swapped the logo on Coca-Cola, Diet Coke, and Coke Zero bottles and cans in many European countries with 150 of the most popular local names for a summer-long "Share a Coke" campaign. The same campaign was used in North America the following summer.

For Christmas 2013, Coke Zero launched an interactive website that allowed people to customize the designs of their Christmas sweater, which have a significant role in United Kingdom Christmas traditions. On the website, people could detail the cut, pattern, and icons for their sweater, and join a popularity contest. Users could choose designs from Christmas trees and Santa's head to reindeer, sleighs, and turkeys. This initiative was tied to a social media campaign, where the top 100 sweater designs with the most votes were manufactured and shipped to the contest winners. According to the Coca-Cola Company, the website generated nearly 42,000 sweater designs in its first four days.

== Sales ==
As of 2024, Coke Zero is the seventh best selling soda in the United States and has had the largest rise in market share in the United States among sodas since its introduction in 2005.

== Variants ==
=== Standard ===
Name	Launched	Notes	Photo
Coca-Cola Cherry Zero Sugar	2007	Coca-Cola Zero Sugar with cherry flavor. The drink was first introduced in the United States in Late-January 2007 prior to its official debut which occurred on February 7, 2007, at New York Fashion Week.	
Coca-Cola Vanilla Zero Sugar	2007	Coca-Cola Zero Sugar with additional vanilla flavor. Introduced in the US in June 2007 concurrently with the relaunch of Coca-Cola Vanilla, and has since been launched elsewhere.	
Coca-Cola Zero Sugar Zero Caffeine	2010	Coca-Cola Zero Sugar without caffeine (formerly marketed as "Caffeine-Free Coca-Cola Zero Sugar"). First released in France in February 2010 as Coca-Cola Zero Sans Caféine It was later released in Japan as Coca-Cola Zero Free in April 2010. In Israel, The Netherlands, Belgium, Greece and Luxembourg as Coca-Cola Zero Caffeine Free since the start of 2011 and in the US since July 2013. In Great Britain it is referred to as Coca-Cola Zero Zero.	
Coca-Cola Lemon Zero Sugar	2017	Coca-Cola Zero Sugar with additional lemon flavor. It has been sold since 2017 in a number of countries mainly in Europe.	
Coca-Cola Peach Zero Sugar	2018	Coca-Cola Zero Sugar with peach flavor. Released in Great Britain in 2018, Australia and Lithuania in 2019	
Coca-Cola Clear	2018	A 'clear' version of Coca-Cola Zero Sugar, with a hint of extra lemon. Released in Japan in 2018.	
Coca-Cola Raspberry Zero Sugar	2018	Coca-Cola Zero Sugar with raspberry flavor, first released in Norway and since then in some other countries.	
Coca-Cola Cinnamon Zero Sugar	2018	Coca-Cola Zero Sugar with extra cinnamon flavor. Released in Britain, Czechia, Poland, Lithuania and Estonia in 2018 for the Christmas period.	
Coca-Cola Stevia No Sugar	2018	Coca-Cola Stevia No Sugar was a variant that used stevia as its sole sweetener. Replaced Coca-Cola Life in New Zealand on 7 May 2018. Product lineups of Coke No Sugar and the still-lingering-in-this-region original incarnation of Coke Zero were both phased out completely in New Zealand as of June 2022, and replaced with the reformulated & rebranded Coke Zero Sugar product line.	
Coca-Cola Orange Vanilla Zero Sugar	2019	Coca-Cola Zero Sugar with orange and vanilla flavors, first released in 2019.	
Coca-Cola Energy Zero Sugar	2019	Coca-Cola Zero Sugar with ingredients found in other Energy Drinks. First launched in 2019 and since expanded to other countries.	
Coca-Cola Lime Zero Sugar	2019	Coca-Cola Zero Sugar with a Lime flavor.	
Coca-Cola Cherry Vanilla Zero Sugar	2020	Coca-Cola Zero Sugar with cherry and vanilla flavors. Released in the United States on February 10, 2020.	
Coca-Cola Orange Zero Sugar	2020	Coca-Cola Zero Sugar with orange flavor.	
Coca-Cola Zero Mango	2020	Coca-Cola Zero Sugar with mango flavor. Available only in Israel.	
Coca-Cola Zero Calories Lemon-Lime	2021	Coca-Cola Zero Sugar with a Lemon and Lime flavor. Available only in Jordan.	

=== Coca-Cola Creations ===
Name	Launched	Notes	Photo
Coca-Cola Starlight Zero Sugar	2022	Coca-Cola Zero Sugar with "space-inspired" flavor also branded Coca-Cola Intergalactic in some markets.	
Coca-Cola Marshmello Zero Sugar	2022	Coca-Cola Zero Sugar flavored with watermelon and strawberry. Created in collaboration with electronic music producer/DJ Marshmello.	
Coca-Cola Dreamworld Zero Sugar	2022	Coca-Cola Zero Sugar with a mystery "dreams-inspired" flavor.	Romanian Coca-Cola Creations cans.
Coca-Cola Movement Zero Sugar	2023	Coca-Cola Zero Sugar with a mystery "transformation" flavor, also branded Coca-Cola Movement in some markets. Created in collaboration with Rosalía.	
Coca-Cola Ultimate Zero Sugar	2023	Coca-Cola Zero Sugar with a mystery "+XP" flavor. Created in collaboration with League of Legends developer Riot Games.	
Coca-Cola 3000 Zero Sugar	2023	Coca-Cola Zero Sugar with a "future-inspired" flavor co-created with AI.	
Oreo Coca-Cola Zero Sugar	2024	Limited edition variant of Coca-Cola made in collaboration with Oreo, sold in 35 countries worldwide.	

== See also ==
- Pepsi Zero Sugar
- Sugar substitute
