= Coca-Cola Cherry Vanilla =

Variation of Coca-Cola

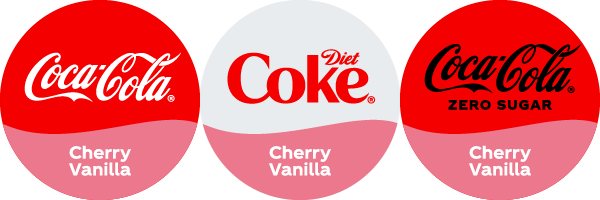
Coca Cola Cherry Vanilla logos as they appear on Freestyle

Coca-Cola Cherry Vanilla is a variation of Coca-Cola, a mix of the flavors Coca-Cola Cherry and Coca-Cola Vanilla. They have been available on Freestyle fountains and were also from 2020 to 2024 produced and sold in bottles and cans.

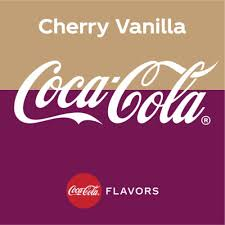
Initial logo on cans

It was introduced in packaged form by The Coca-Cola Company in February 2020 in response to the popularity of the flavor combination at Coca-Cola Freestyle machines. Its launch, along with that of Coca-Cola Orange Vanilla in 2019 (as well as Coca-Cola Cinnamon and the Japan exclusive Coca-Cola Strawberry) represented a strategic shift to Coca-Cola introducing new brands under its core Coca-Cola branding, which had not occurred since 2007.

In 2022, the can was redesigned to be purple and gold to signify the combination of flavors.

In September 2024, Coca-Cola confirmed in an X post that Cherry Vanilla was being discontinued in its bottle form due to slumping sales and changing lifestyles. The flavor will remain in Coke Freestyle machines.

In February 2026, Coca-Cola announced that a similar drink, Coca-Cola Cherry Float, would be released in the United States, Canada and the United Kingdom.
