= Coca-Cola Cherry =

Cherry-flavored cola soft drink

Cherry Coca-Cola
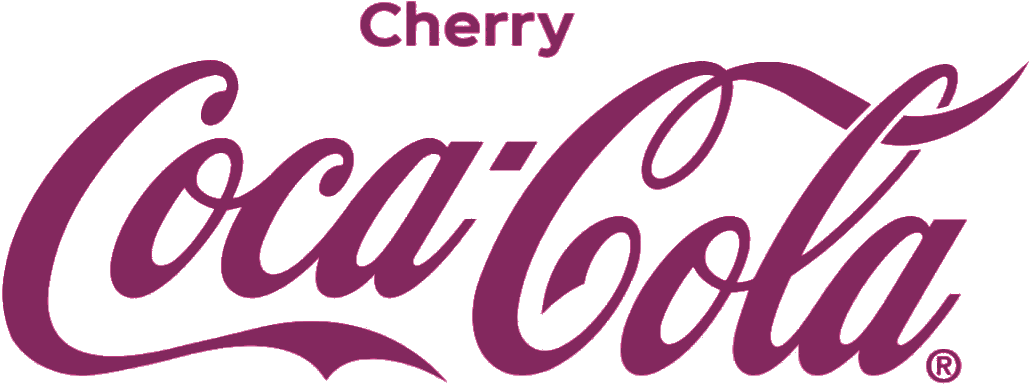

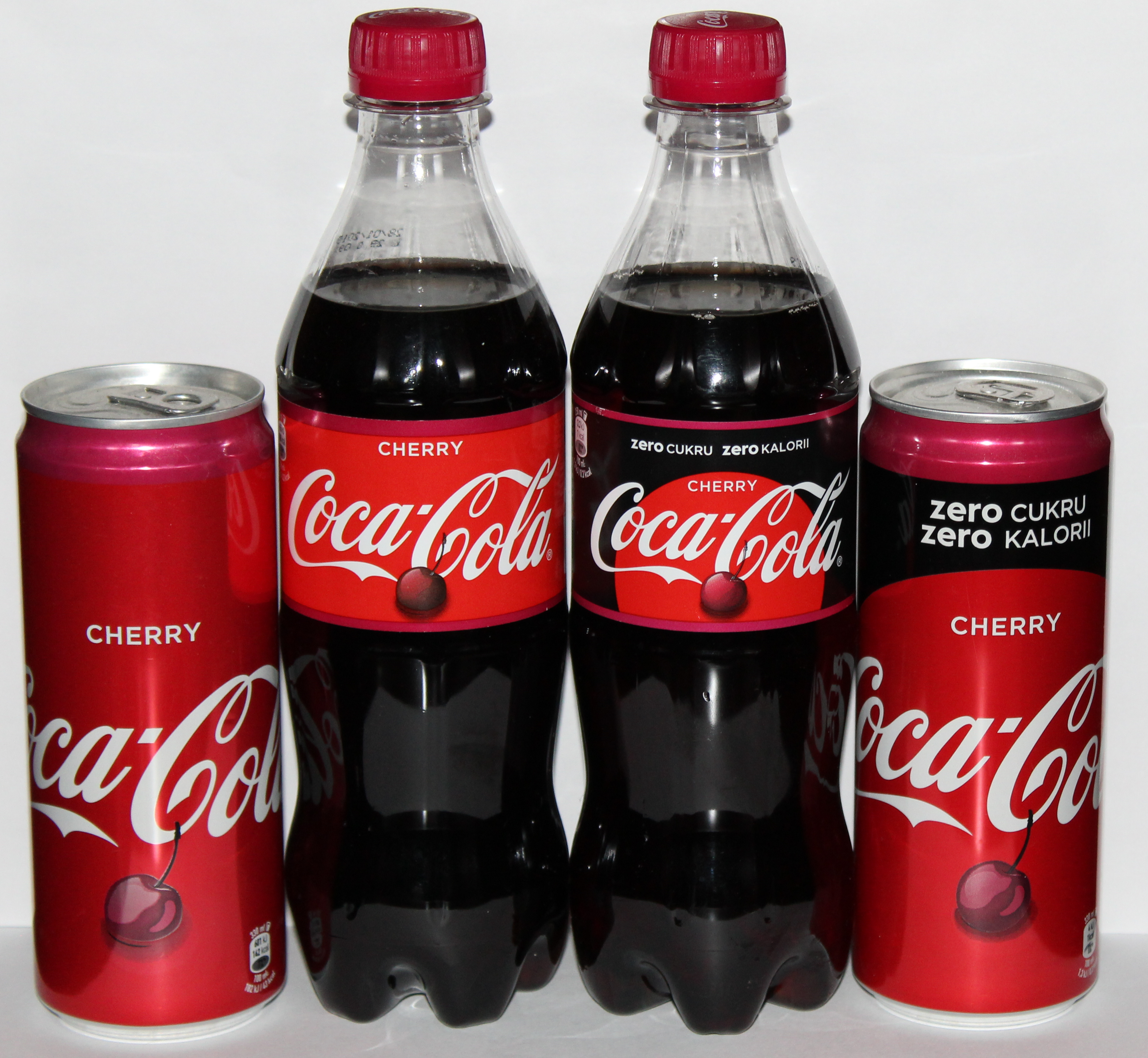
- Bottles and cans of Coca-Cola Cherry and Coca-Cola Cherry Zero from Poland
- Type: Cherry cola
- Manufacturer: The Coca-Cola Company
- Origin: United States
- Introduced: February 19, 1985; 41 years ago
- Variants: Diet Coke Cherry (Coca-Cola Light Cherry); Coca-Cola Zero Sugar Cherry
- Related products: Coca-Cola Black Cherry Vanilla; Coca-Cola Cherry Vanilla
- Website: coca-cola.com/cherry

Coca-Cola Cherry, also referred to by its original name Cherry Coke, is a cherry-flavored version of Coca-Cola. It is produced and distributed by the Coca-Cola Company and its bottlers in the United States and some international markets. Coca-Cola Cherry was originally launched in 1985, the very first flavored cola to be distributed by the company, and their second ever product extending the original Coca-Cola brand following the launch of Diet Coke in 1982. Today there are also no-calorie variants based on Diet Coke and Coca-Cola Zero Sugar. In addition, the drink is also available microdispensed through Coca-Cola's Freestyle vending machines.

== Background ==
Long before its official introduction in stores in 1985, many diners, drugstore soda fountains and movie theaters dispensed an unofficial version by adding cherry-flavored syrup to Coca-Cola.

Original Cherry Coke logo from 1985

The Coca-Cola Company first began testing its official Cherry flavored version of Coke along with other flavors on visitors to the 1982 World's Fair in Knoxville, Tennessee. Following further tests in various markets, Cherry Coke then entered mainstream production in the U.S. during the summer of 1985. Cherry Coke was the third variation of Coca-Cola at that time – the others being regular Coca-Cola and Diet Coke – as well as the first flavored Coke (there would not be another flavored Coke until Diet Coke with Lemon in 2001). Cherry Coke was released nationally around the same time as New Coke, the controversial reformulation of original Coca-Cola. The company boasted Cherry Coke as "the first major entry into a whole new category: cherry-flavored sodas."

In 1991, Coca-Cola reformulated Cherry Coke to make it taste more similar to fountain cherry cola after sales began to decline.

== Packaging and marketing ==
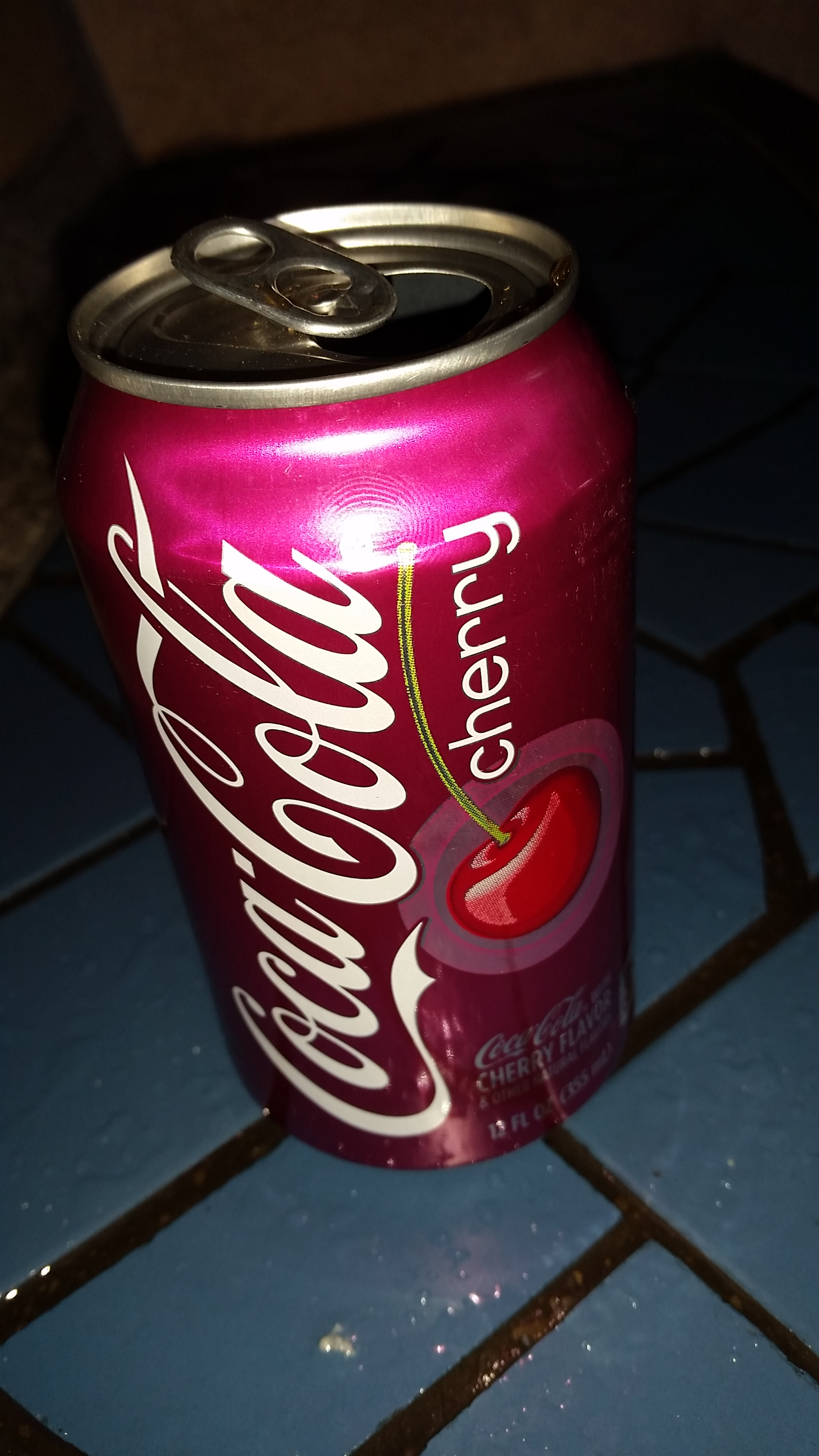
Can of Coca-Cola Cherry from 2016

Packaging for Coca-Cola Cherry may differ from country to country. In the United States, Coca-Cola has altered the logos and label designs for Coca-Cola Cherry several times since it was introduced in 1985. In most cases, the can and bottle label designs have consisted of a purple hue, often with depictions of cherries.

Cherry Coke's design was significantly changed beginning in 1994, adopting a graffiti inspired design as part of a major makeover by Coca-Cola targeting the youth. The design was rolled out in phases in different markets around the world. In Canada, the drink was reintroduced in 1998 after a few years off market and the "Do something different" campaign was launched both there and in America for youth.

In April 2002, Coca-Cola announced the repositioning of Cherry Coke and a new look, consistent with that of the then newly launching Vanilla Coke. On February 7, 2007, Coca-Cola launched a new campaign for the Coca-Cola Cherry brand in the US, resulting in a significant redesign of the product's label. American rapper and record producer Jay-Z was chosen to be the spokesman and played a part in designing the new can graphics.

As part of Coca-Cola's ongoing "One Brand" marketing campaign, a new U.S. packaging design for Coca-Cola Cherry was introduced in January 2019. The new packaging follows the design principles already employed in the United States for Coca-Cola, Coca-Cola Zero Sugar, and Coca-Cola Life. The word "Coca-Cola" is superimposed upon a red disc with a picture of a cherry below the text. The background color of the can or bottle remains the same shade of purple introduced in the 2007 design. The word "Cherry" is placed above the red disc, similar to the "Original Taste" text currently used on cans and bottles of original Coca-Cola.

== Distribution ==
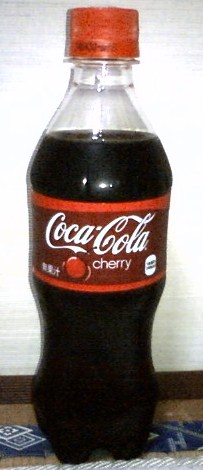
Plastic bottle of Coca-Cola Cherry sold in Japan in 2013

After its original launch in 1985, the product quickly garnered great interest throughout America. Internationally, Cherry Coke was test marketed in Japan to positive interest. The drink was rolled out to Canada, Puerto Rico, Norway and the Netherlands by the end of 1985. By the end of 1986, availability was expanded to 33 markets around the world.

Since then, the product has been sold on and off in various markets throughout the Americas, Africa, Asia, Europe and Oceania. Cherry Coke was first introduced to New Zealand in 1993 and to Australia in 2003. In Japan, it was discontinued a few years after its release, but has since seen limited edition revivals. In Sweden it was also discontinued during the 1980s but was relaunched in the country in 2012.

In Spain, the drink was introduced in 1995 and sold for three years. It returned as a limited edition in 2013 before becoming permanent due to demand. In Poland, Cherry Coke made its debut in 1996 and was sold until 2018, replaced by the Zero Sugar version.

Coca-Cola Cherry returned to the market in Brazil during the 2016 Summer Olympics as a limited edition drink. It launched in Austria permanently in 2025 after having had periodic limited edition runs for ten years.

=== Diet/Light version ===
With the success of the original Cherry Coke, Diet Cherry Coke was introduced in 1986 as a low-calorie version of the original and the first flavor expansion within the Diet Coke lineup. It has also been marketed in some countries as "Coca-Cola Cherry Light" and "Coca-Cola Light Cherry", while its original name was renamed to "Diet Coke Cherry" in 2005. The drink is also available within Coca-Cola Freestyle machines.

In October 2020, the Coca-Cola Company announced that the drink would be withdrawn from the American market at the end of December 2020. It was announced in January 2025 that Diet Coke Cherry would be returning in stores for a limited time only under its original name of Diet Cherry Coke, exclusively in Kroger stores in the US. In addition, 32 packs would be exclusively available in Costco stores in Canada. The return featured the retro 1980s design of the product. In 2026, it was revived permanently on store shelves.

The drink was released in Great Britain in 2006, replacing Coca-Cola Vanilla and Diet Coke Vanilla. In 2018, to coincide with Diet Coke's "Millenial" rebranding, Diet Coke Cherry was fully replaced with Diet Coke Feisty Cherry, which featured a bolder cherry taste than the original and was produced till 2020. In October 2025, the drink was relaunched in Great Britain with the same retro-packaging as the US and Canada, and was released exclusively in Tesco stores. This limited run also proved successful for Coca-Cola, announcing in December 2025 that the drink would also see a permanent return in the UK beginning in January 2026. In March 2026, the drink was introduced in Republic of Ireland

=== Zero Sugar version ===
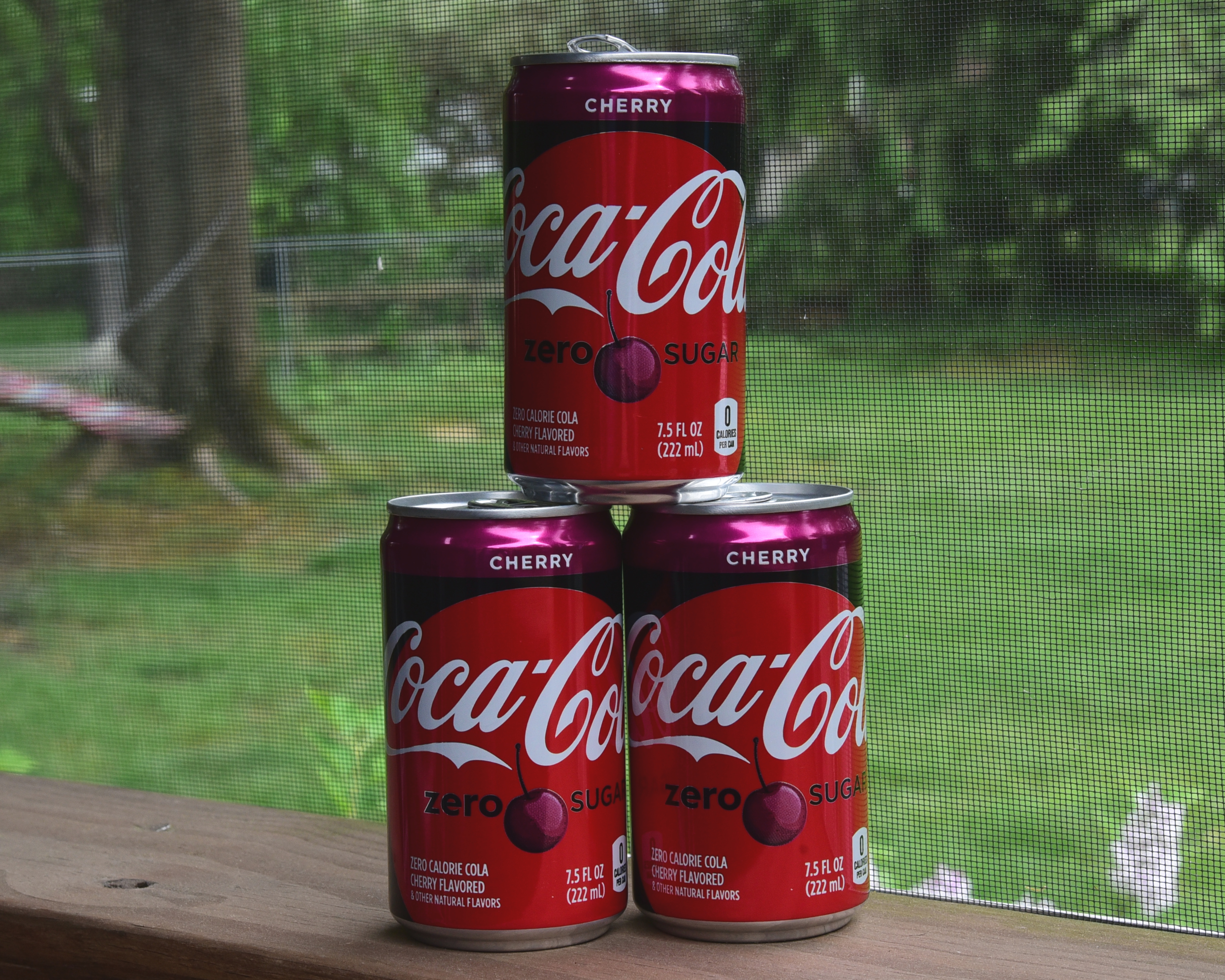
Cans of Coca-Cola Zero Sugar Cherry from 2020 using the "One Brand" design

Coca-Cola Zero Sugar Cherry is the low-calorie variant based on Coca-Cola Zero Sugar. It was introduced in February 2007 in the United States as Coca-Cola Cherry Zero.

The drink was later expanded internationally, beginning with France in March 2013. In Europe it has since been released in several other countries including in Britain in 2016, Poland in 2017, the Netherlands in 2022, and Sweden in 2024.
