= Coca-Cola Vanilla =

Vanilla-flavored cola

- Coca-Cola Vanilla logo since 2024 (regional variations exist)

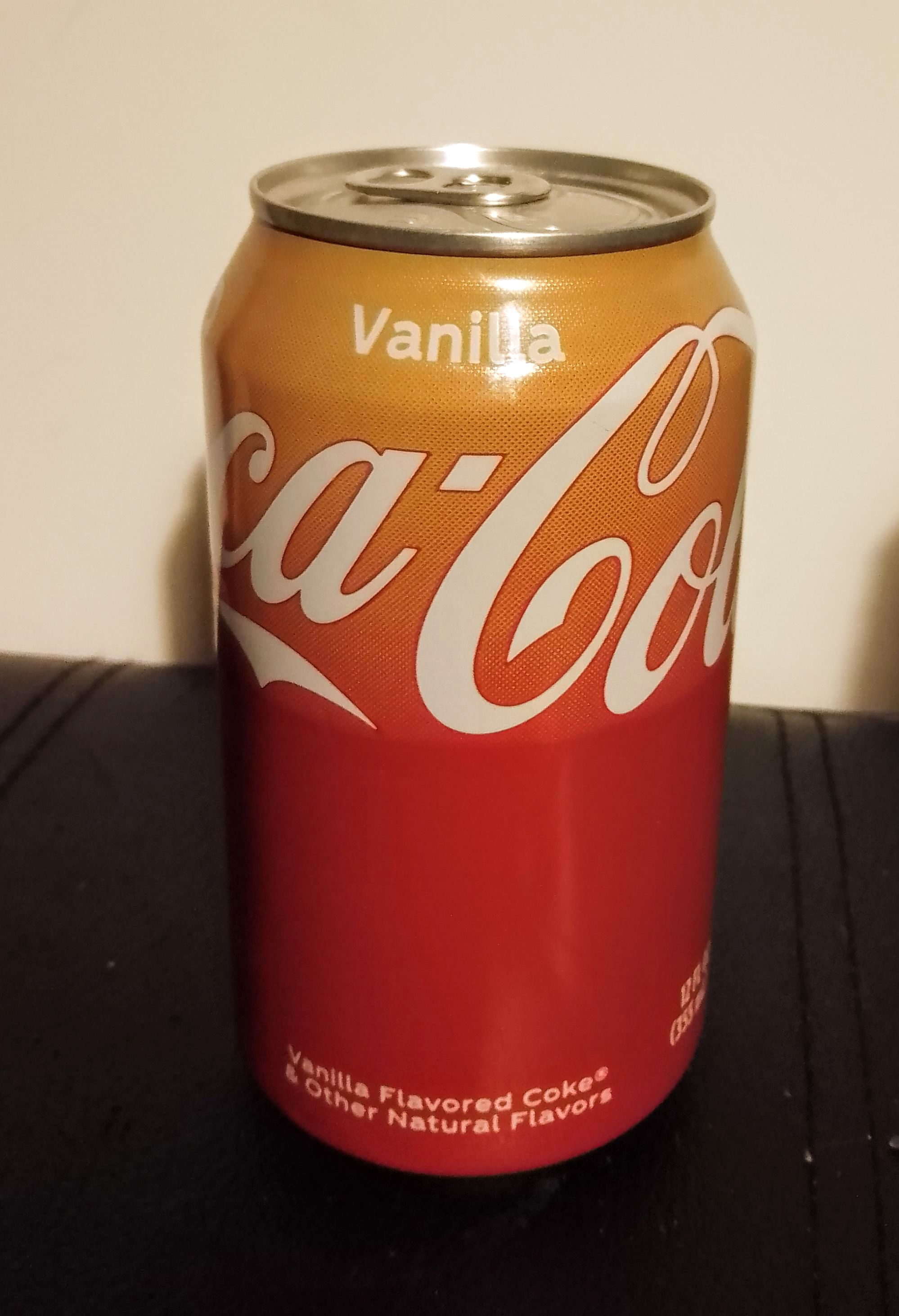
- A can of Coca-Cola Vanilla sold in 2024
- Type: Vanilla-flavored cola
- Manufacturer: The Coca-Cola Company
- Origin: United States
- Introduced: May 15, 2002; 24 years ago
- Variants: Diet Vanilla Coke, Coke Vanilla Zero
- Related products: Coca-Cola Black Cherry Vanilla; Coca-Cola Cherry; Coca-Cola Orange Vanilla
- Website: cocacola.com/vanilla

Coca-Cola Vanilla, originally marketed (and still commonly known) as Vanilla Coke, is a vanilla-flavored version of Coca-Cola, a cola soft drink, produced by The Coca-Cola Company since 2002. A no-calorie version also exists, Coca-Cola Vanilla Zero Sugar, based on Coca-Cola Zero Sugar. The drink is also distributed using a Coca-Cola Freestyle machine, which injects vanilla syrup into regular Coca-Cola.

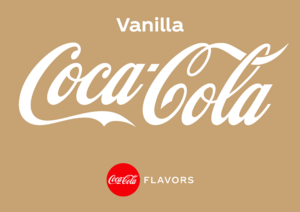
Former logo (2021–24) before the gradient effect

At launch, Vanilla Coke was at the time the Coca-Cola Company's biggest product launch since Diet Coke. In the United States, it was the fourth brand extension in Coca-Cola's history, following Diet Coke (1982), Cherry Coke (1985), and Lemon Diet Coke (2001); in many other countries which did not receive the latter two, Vanilla Coke became the first flavored Coca-Cola product. Coca-Cola Vanilla has been variously marketed around the world since, and in the United States it was initially discontinued in cans and bottles in 2005 before relaunching two years later. The company has also released other combo varieties of Vanilla: Coca-Cola Black Cherry Vanilla in 2006, Coca-Cola Orange Vanilla in 2019, and Coca-Cola Cherry Vanilla in 2020.

== Development ==
Original Coca-Cola already contains small amounts of vanilla. The history of adding additional vanilla flavoring to Coca-Cola, at least in the US, dates back at least to the 1940s when local soda fountain workers (soda jerks) would upon request add a "shot" (roughly two tablespoons) of vanilla syrup to a (12–16 oz) Coca-Cola fountain soda. For decades, this remained common practice in ice cream shops where vanilla syrup and Coca-Cola were both available.

The Coca-Cola Company first tested a Coca-Cola blend with extra vanilla flavoring at the 1982 World's Fair in Knoxville, Tennessee, along with Cherry Coke. After the introduction of Cherry Coke and the failure of New Coke in 1985, the company was hesitant to introduce anything radically new. It was not until April 2002 that rumors began to circulate that the company was planning a new variation on their classic soft drink. The Coca-Cola Company was tight-lipped regarding the details of the new beverage, commenting to a London-based newspaper, "We've always got a number of things in development," leaving open speculation for what was to develop. It was later revealed that testing for a vanilla flavor had been completed and that the new beverage would be available in months. However, in late April, 2002, the company announced that Vanilla Coke would begin production as early as May.

=== Marketing campaign ===
The marketing campaign for Vanilla Coke during its 2002 launch aimed to appeal across all generations. Yolanda Ball, brand manager for Coca-Cola Classic, said, "We had to learn how to balance the newness of vanilla with the established qualities of Coca-Cola". The diet variety would be directed primarily at women. The first public tasting of Vanilla Coke took place in the Buckhead district of Atlanta at the Three Dollar Cafe with Atlanta radio station Q100 and their morning hosts from The Bert Show. The first batch of Vanilla Cokes debuted at the Vanilla Bean Café, locally known as "the Bean," in Pomfret, Connecticut.

One of the first notable advertisements was a television ad created by The Martin Agency, which was based upon the product's original campaign line of "Reward Your Curiosity". The ad featured actor Chazz Palminteri, in which he and another man pull a teenager (played by a young Aaron Paul) into an alley after catching him peering into a hole. Palminteri gives the boy a Vanilla Coke, as a reward for his curiosity. Their former website rewardyourcuriosity.com went along with the campaign and drew significant interest at the time. (In the Philippine version of the ad, Palminteri's role was taken by actor Johnny Delgado.) Ms. Ball described the ad: "We were trying to create something new and intriguing. Half of it was about new, different and change of pace, and the rest of it was about how people love and trust Coca-Cola. But we didn't have to say New from Coca-Cola. We didn't have to hit them over the head with it."

=== Overseas launch ===
The introduction of vanilla flavor was hailed by The Coca-Cola Company as "the greatest innovation since Diet Coke in 1983". Later in 2002, it was introduced to Australia, Norway and Sweden. As of 2003, Vanilla Coke was marketed in several European countries including France, Germany, Britain, as well as Mexico, Thailand, Australia and New Zealand, and South Africa. In 2003, PepsiCo introduced Pepsi Vanilla to compete with Vanilla Coke.

== Distribution ==
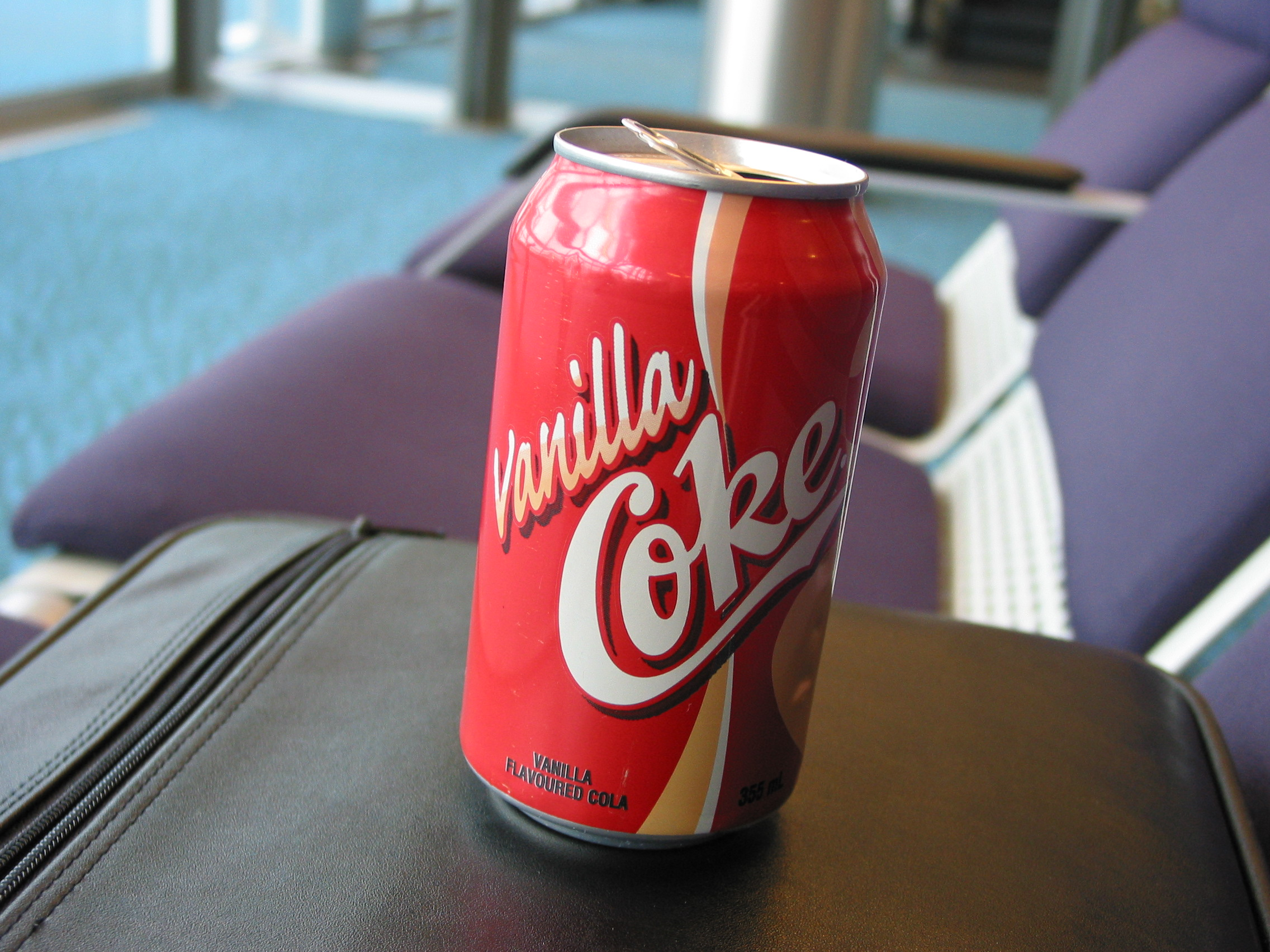
Vanilla Coke can from 2002

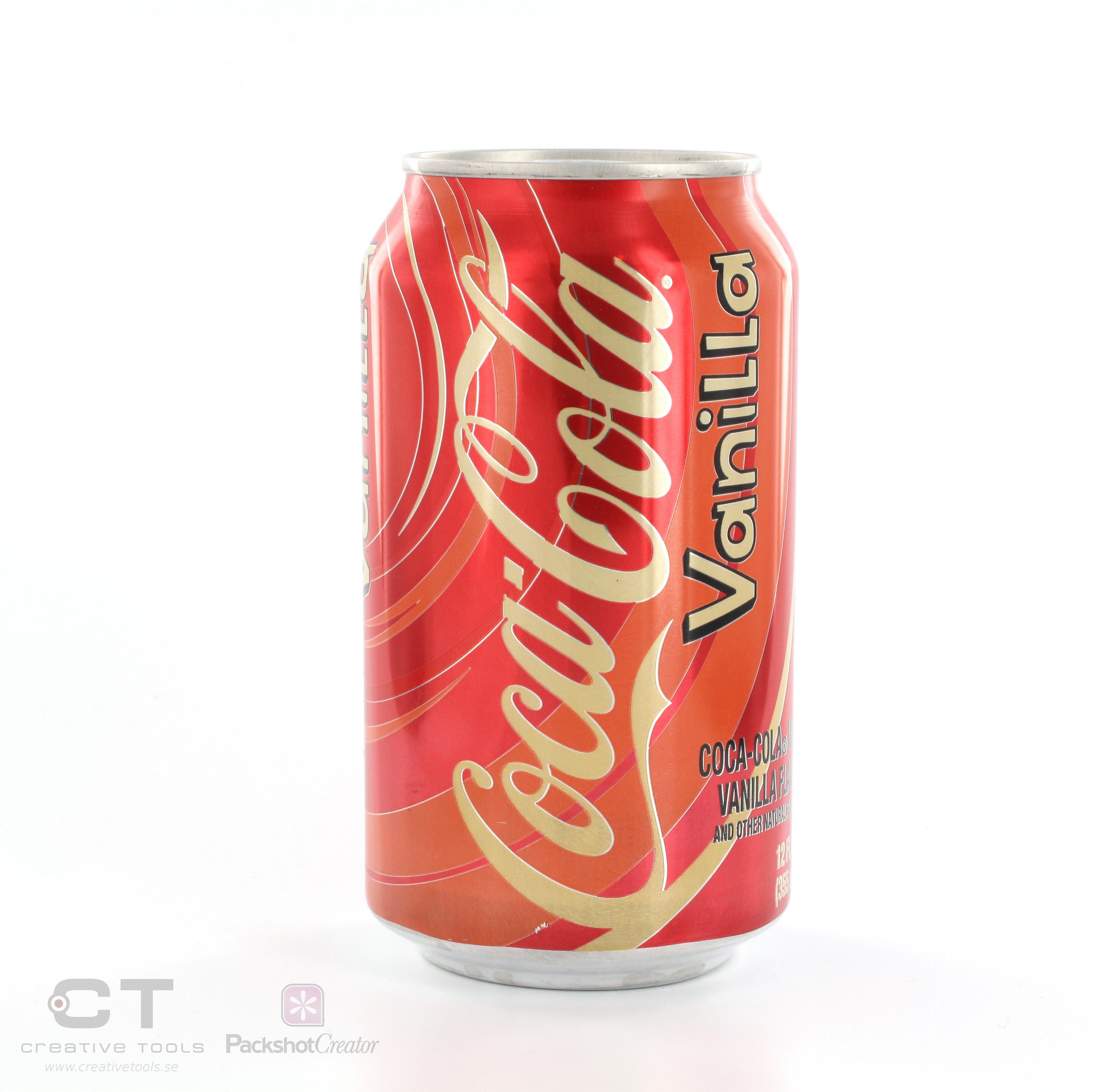
Coca-Cola Vanilla can after 2007 American relaunch

By late 2003, the company had marketed Vanilla Coke in over 30 countries around the globe. The "Vanilla Coke" name was originally used in the United States and Canada, as well as many other countries around the world such as Germany and Asian territories, whereas "Coca-Cola Vanilla" was the brand used in some places such as the Netherlands, France (translated to Coca-Cola Vanille) and Mexico (translated to Coca-Cola Vainilla).

Customer and commercial reception was mixed: in markets such as Hong Kong and Thailand, Vanilla Coke had a positive impact. However, the product struggled in North America and some other regions, including India. North American sales peaked in its inaugural year in 2002. It is estimated that the product was purchased by about 29% of all United States households that year. Doubt was cast over the future of Vanilla Coke and its diet version when the company announced the 2004 sales figures: 35 million unit cases in North America compared to 90 million in 2002; Vanilla Diet Coke dropped from 23 million unit cases in its inaugural year (2003) to 13 million in 2004. Because of declining sales, the Coca-Cola Company announced in November 2005 that Vanilla Coke would be discontinued in North America and Great Britain by the end of the year. Vanilla Coke production had already ended in Sweden earlier in 2005. Coca-Cola introduced Black Cherry Vanilla Coke and Diet Black Cherry Vanilla Coke for the North American market in January 2006 as a replacement.

The beverage continued to be produced and sold in many other markets where it performed better, such as Australia, France, Russia, Malaysia, and Germany, but was also grey imported to some places. The drink started being officially introduced into new markets in China and other European and Asian countries in 2007, including being re-introduced into New Zealand on February 19, 2007. Soon afterwards, Coca-Cola announced that the drink, now known as Coca-Cola Vanilla, would officially be brought back to the United States after a year and a half hiatus. It relaunched on May 25, 2007 at the World of Coca-Cola Museum in Atlanta, Georgia, in a partnership with Edy's Ice Cream to co-advertise with Coke on the launch, and featured a 10-ton Vanilla Coke float, which was certified by the Guinness World Records as the largest ice cream float in the world. A Coca-Cola Vanilla Zero, based on Coca-Cola Zero, was also introduced. The advertising campaign for the revival used an instrumental cover of "Welcome Back".

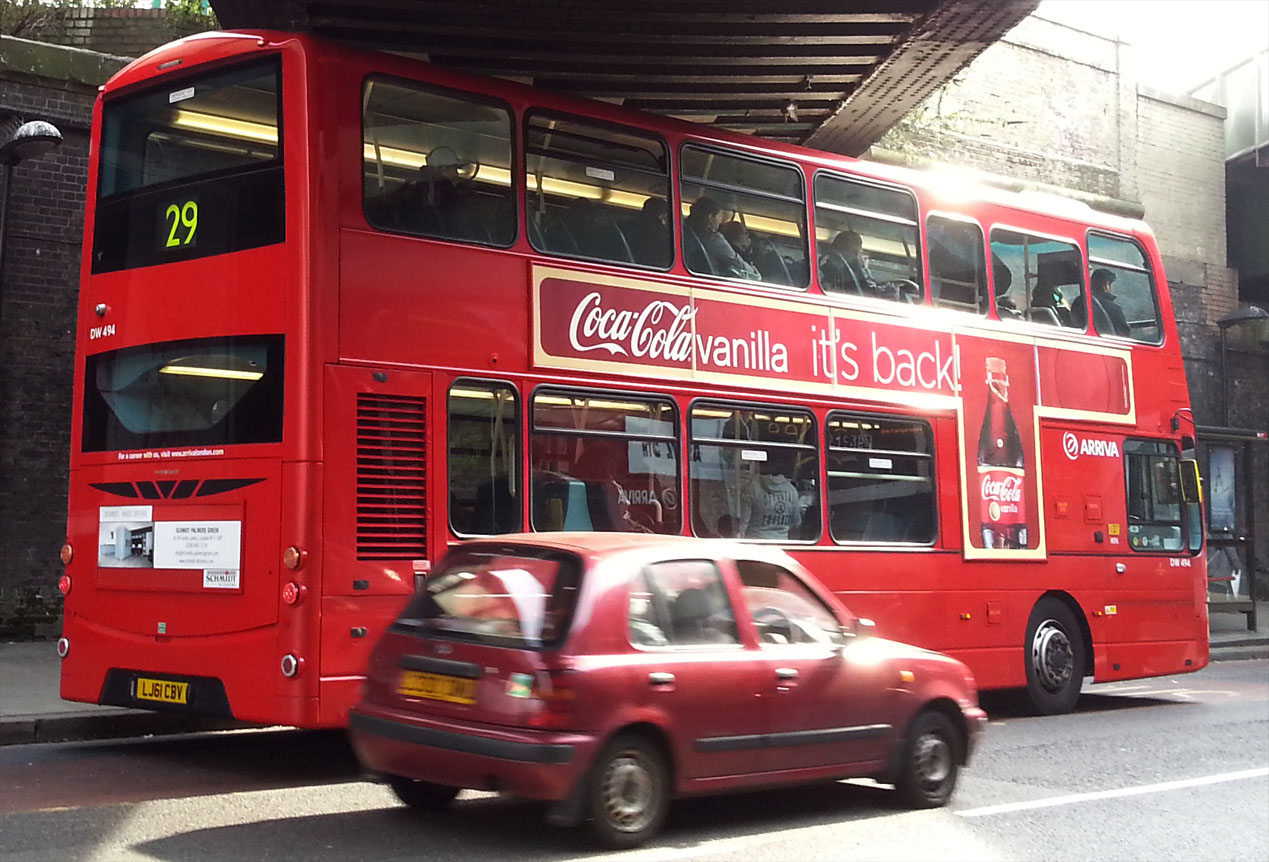
Advert celebrating the re-launch of Coca-Cola Vanilla on the side of a bus in London

During the 2016 Summer Olympics the vanilla and cherry version was presented to selected markets in Brazil. The drink returned in bottled and canned form in Canada in 2016, more than a decade after it was withdrawn.

In July 2018, Coca-Cola Vanilla re-appeared in Russia as limited edition in Magnit supermarkets, but due to high sales, it became available in all retail chains as a permanent product.

== Packaging ==
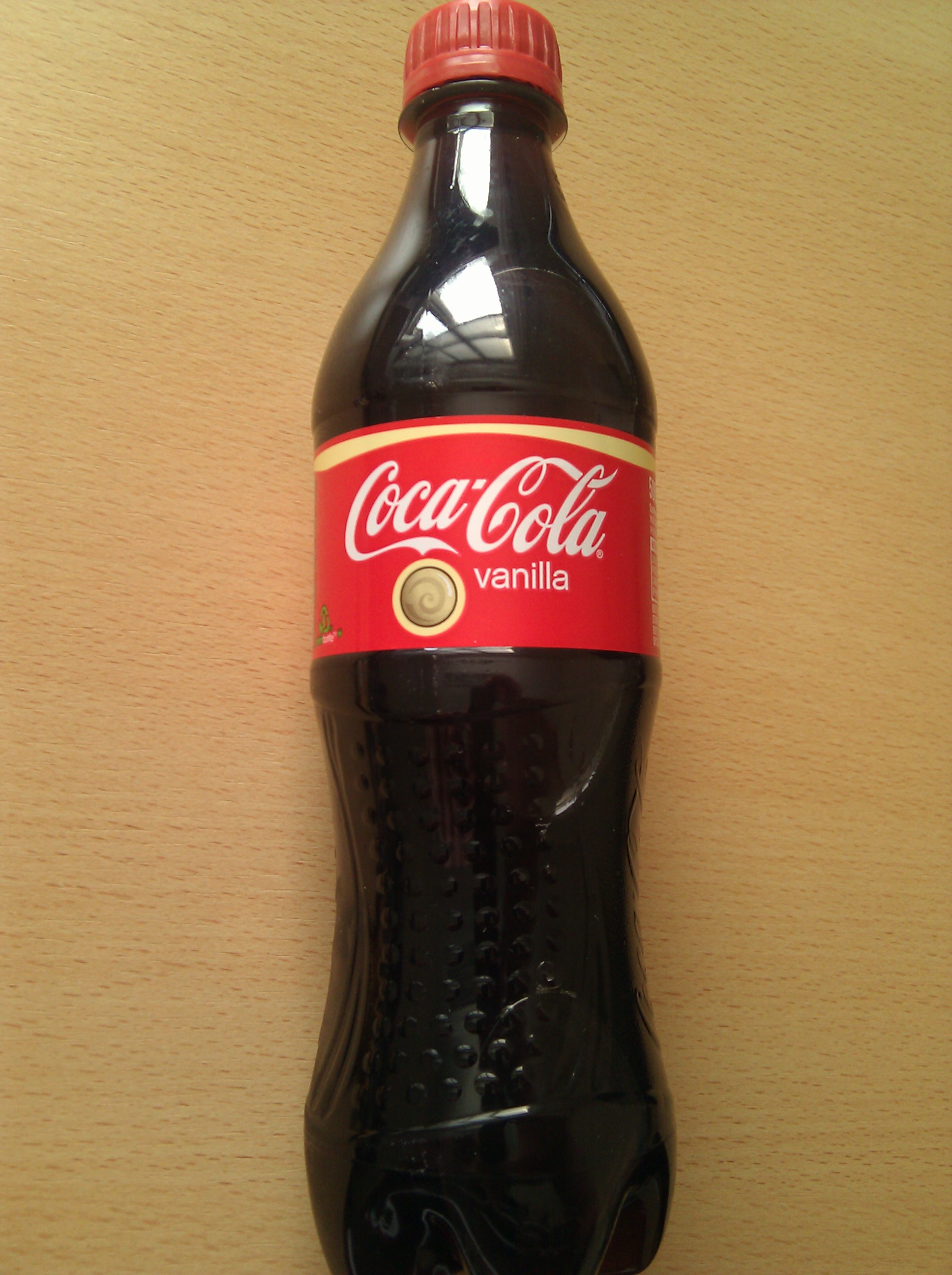
Coca-Cola Vanilla bottle sold in 2013

Vanilla Coke was initially packaged in standard bottles in accordance with appropriate Coca-Cola packaging. For a brief period of time in mid-2003, the bottles that Vanilla Coke came in, which had before said Vanilla Coke, were changed simply to V (which matched Cherry Coke's new labeling showing a picture of a cherry).

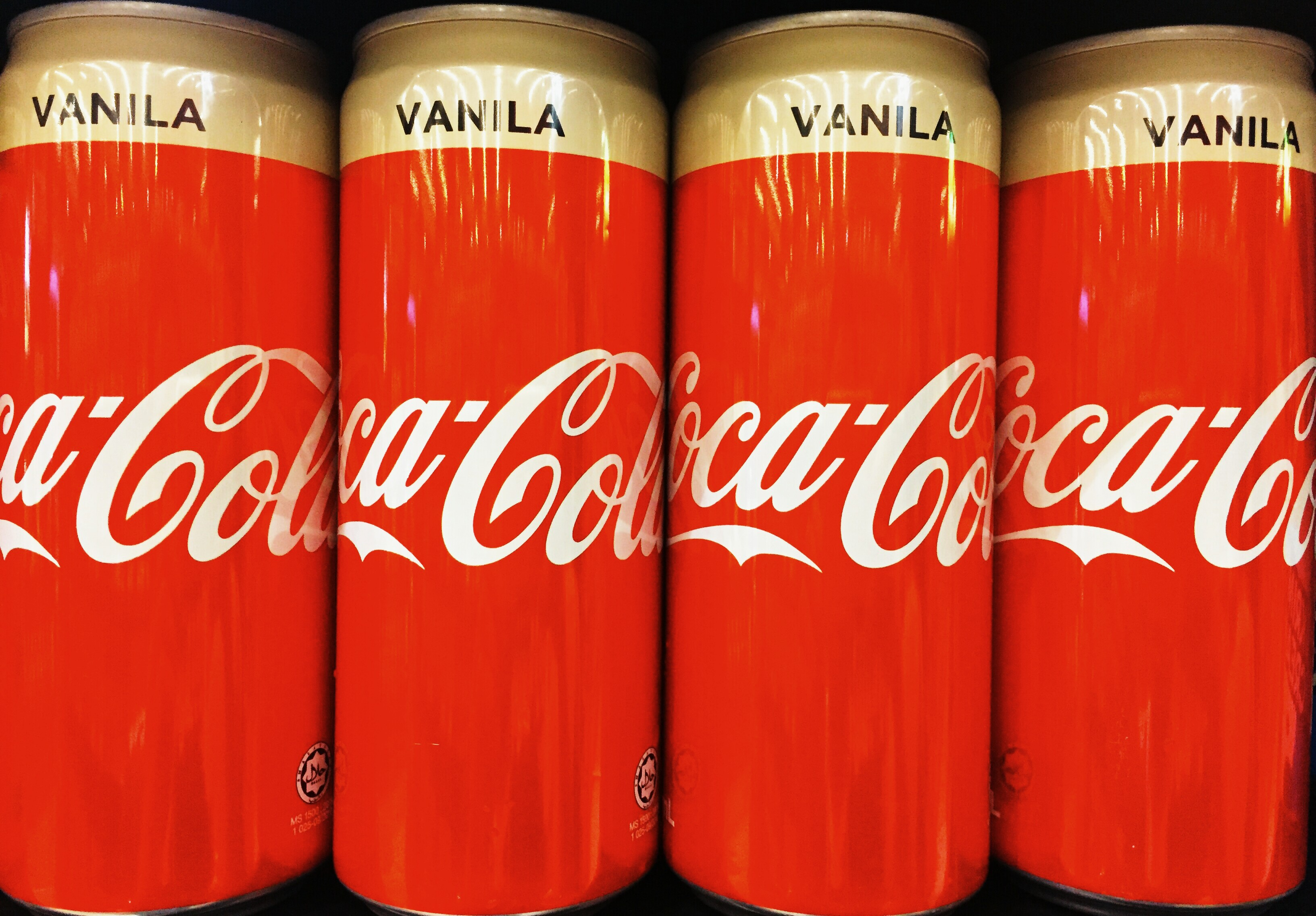
Cans of Coca-Cola Vanilla as sold in Malaysia in 2019 (during the company's "One Brand" branding era)

As part of Coca-Cola's ongoing "One Brand" marketing campaign, a new U.S. packaging design for Coca-Cola Vanilla was introduced in January 2019. The new packaging follows the design principles already employed in the United States for Coca-Cola, Coca-Cola Zero Sugar, and Coca-Cola Life. The word "Coca-Cola" is superimposed upon a red disc with a light beige drop (representing a drop of vanilla syrup) below the text. The background color of the can or bottle is light beige in color.

== Non-sugar variants ==
=== Diet Coke Vanilla ===
In addition to Coca-Cola Vanilla, the company also launched Diet Coke Vanilla as a low-calorie variant based on the Diet Coke formula. This drink was first introduced as "Diet Vanilla Coke" in the fall of 2002 in the United States, shortly after the launch of the regular Vanilla Coke. It was released in 2003 in Australia as "Diet Coke with Vanilla". In some other countries it was known as "Diet Coke Vanilla", with emphasis on the Diet Coke label, as well as "Coca-Cola Light Vanilla" or "Vanilla Coke Light" in some markets like Hong Kong. It was discontinued along with the normal Vanilla Coke in North America at the end of 2005. Diet Coke Vanilla continues to be available as a mixer on Coca-Cola Freestyle machines.

=== Zero Sugar Vanilla ===
Coca-Cola Zero Sugar Vanilla is a low-calorie variant of vanilla based on the Coca-Cola Zero Sugar formula. It was introduced as "Vanilla Coke Zero" in 2007, initially sold in the United States, and relaunched under its current name in 2016. The drink was launched in Britain in 2017 but has been discontinued in supermarkets in 2025. It launched in Finland in 2021 (as Vanilja), seven years after the discontinuation of regular Vanilla there. Coca-Cola Zero Sugar Vanilla has been introduced in Thailand in 2025.
