= Eastern Bloc =

Cold War coalition of communist states

The Eastern Bloc, also known as the Communist Bloc (Combloc), the Soviet Bloc, the Socialist Bloc and the Workers Bloc, was an unofficial coalition of communist states of Central and Eastern Europe, Asia, Africa, and Latin America that were aligned with the Soviet Union and existed during the Cold War (1947–1991). These states followed Marxism–Leninism and various forms of socialism and opposed the capitalist Western Bloc. The Eastern Bloc was often called the "Second World", while the term "First World" referred to the Western Bloc and "Third World" referred to the non-aligned countries that were mainly in Africa, Asia, and Latin America but also included the pre-1948 European Soviet ally Yugoslavia. Non-Marxist (yet still socialist) countries, such as the Arab socialist governments of the United Arab Republic, Iraq, Libya, Yemen, etc., are sometimes considered part of the bloc.

In Western Europe, the term 'Eastern Bloc' generally referred to the USSR and Central and Eastern European countries in the Warsaw Pact (East Germany, Poland, Czechoslovakia, Hungary, Romania, Bulgaria, and Albania). (Note: Albania was a member of the Eastern Bloc until the Albanian–Soviet split from 1961 to 1970.) In Asia, the Eastern Bloc comprised Mongolia, North Vietnam, Laos, Kampuchea, North Korea, South Yemen and China. (Note: Until the Sino-Soviet split in 1961.) (Note: Sources: Loth, Wilfried, The Division of the World, 1941–1955, Routledge, 1988, ISBN 0-415-00365-2, p. 297; Haggett, Peter, Encyclopedia of World Geography, Marshall Cavendish, 2001, ISBN 0-7614-7289-4, p. 1,850; Rees, G. Wyn. International Politics in Europe: The New Agenda, Routledge, 1993, ISBN 0-415-08282-X, p. 6; Satyendra, Kush (2003), Encyclopaedic Dictionary of Political Science, Sarup & Sons, p. 65, ISBN 978-81-7890-071-1, "... the countries of Eastern Europe under communism ... ."; Janzen, Jörg; Taraschewski, Thomas (2009). Shahshahānī, Suhaylā (ed.). Cities of Pilgrimage. Iuaes-series. Vol. 4. Münster: LIT Verlag. p. 190. ISBN 9783825816186. Archived from the original on 5 September 2015. "Until 1990, despite being a formally independent state, Mongolia had de facto been an integral part of the Soviet-dominated Eastern Bloc."; Gasztold-Seń, Przemysław; Trentin, Massimiliano; Adamec, Jan (2014). Syria During the Cold War: The East European Connection. 2. Vol. 5. St Andrews, Scotland, U.K.: University of St Andrews, Centre for Syrian Studies. ISBN 9780956873224. ISSN 2056-3175.; Ginat, Rami (April 2000). "The Soviet Union and the Syrian Ba'th regime: From hesitation to Rapprochement". Middle Eastern Studies. 36 (2). London, U.K.: 150–171. doi:10.1080/00263200008701312. JSTOR 4284075. S2CID 144922816.) In the Americas, the countries aligned with the Eastern Bloc were Cuba from 1961, and for a short period, Angola, Nicaragua and Grenada.

== Terminology ==
The term Eastern Bloc was often used interchangeably with the term Second World. This broadest usage of the term would include not only Maoist China and Cambodia, but also short-lived Soviet satellites such as the Second East Turkestan Republic (1944–1949), the People's Republic of Azerbaijan (1945–1946) and the Republic of Mahabad (1946), as well as the Marxist–Leninist states straddling the Second and Third Worlds before the end of the Cold War: the People's Democratic Republic of Yemen (from 1967), the People's Republic of the Congo (from 1969), the People's Republic of Benin, the People's Republic of Angola and People's Republic of Mozambique from 1975, the People's Revolutionary Government of Grenada from 1979 to 1983, the Derg/People's Democratic Republic of Ethiopia from 1974, and the Somali Democratic Republic from 1969 until the Ogaden War in 1977. Although not Marxist–Leninist, leadership of Ba'athist Syria officially regarded their country as part of the Socialist Bloc and established a close economic, military alliance with the Soviet Union.

Many states were accused by the Western Bloc of being in the Eastern Bloc when they were part of the Non-Aligned Movement. The most limited definition of the Eastern Bloc would only include the Warsaw Pact states and the Mongolian People's Republic as former satellite states most dominated by the Soviet Union. Cuba's defiance of complete Soviet control was noteworthy enough that Cuba was sometimes excluded as a satellite state altogether, as it sometimes intervened in other Third World countries even when the Soviet Union opposed this.

Post-1991 usage of the term "Eastern Bloc" may be more limited in referring to the states forming the Warsaw Pact (1955–1991) and Mongolia (1924–1991), which are no longer communist states. Sometimes they are more generally referred to as "the countries of Eastern Europe under communism", excluding Mongolia, but including Yugoslavia and Albania which had both split with the Soviet Union by the 1960s.

Even though Yugoslavia was a socialist country, it was not a member of the Comecon or the Warsaw Pact. Parting with the USSR in 1948, Yugoslavia did not belong to the East, but it also did not belong to the West because of its socialist system and its status as a founding member of the Non-Aligned Movement. However, some sources consider Yugoslavia to be a member of the Eastern Bloc. Others consider Yugoslavia not to be a member after it broke with Soviet policy in the 1948 Tito–Stalin split.

== List of states ==
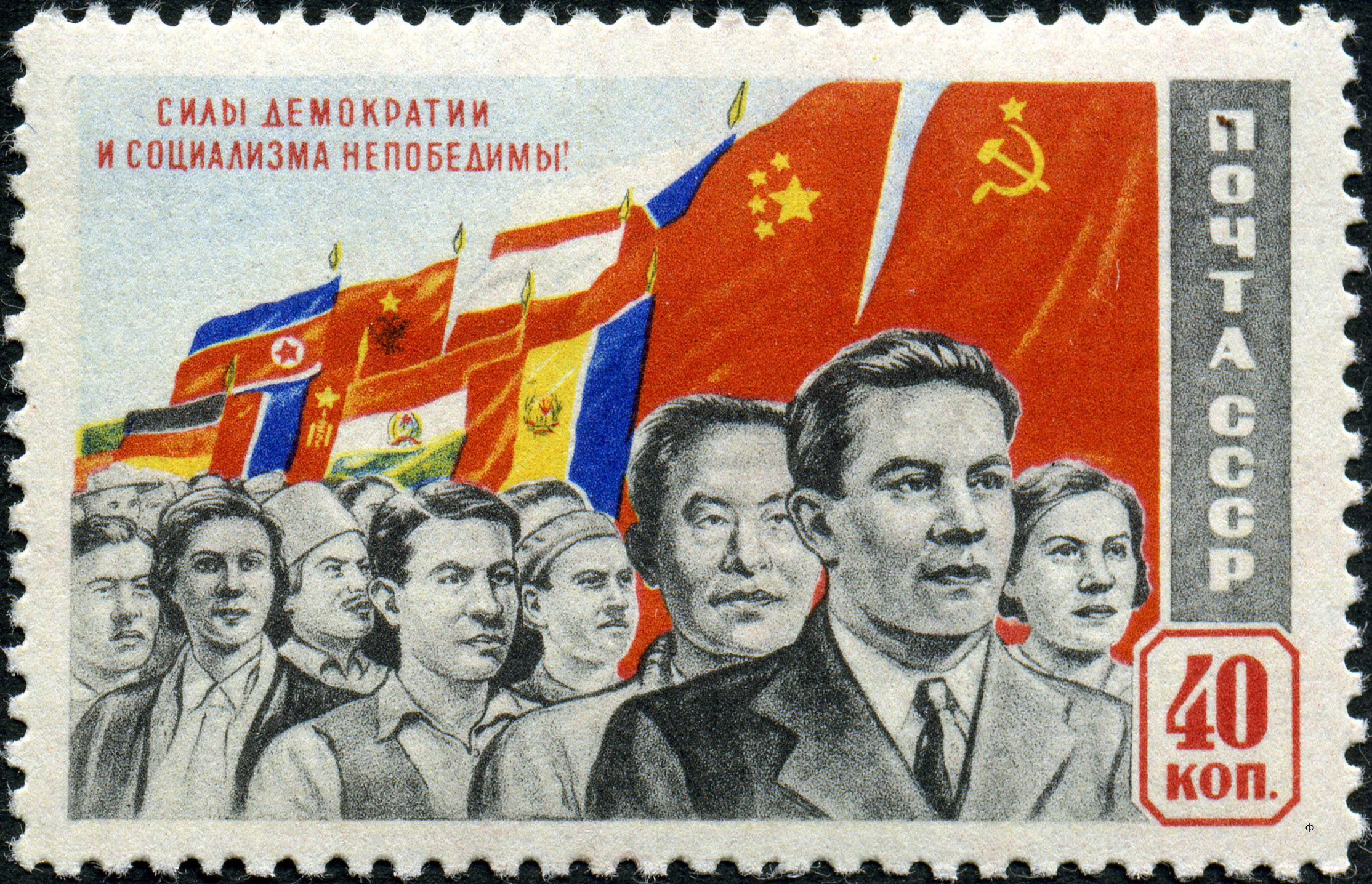
1950 Soviet stamp, depicting the flags and peoples of communist states at the time, including those of Eastern Europe

=== Warsaw Pact (1955–1991) ===
- Albania (1946–1968, ceased participating in Comecon and Warsaw Pact activities in 1961, then officially withdrew in 1968 from the WP and in 1987 from Comecon)
- Bulgaria (1946–1990)
- Czechoslovakia (1948–1989)
- East Germany (1949–1989)
- Hungary (1949–1989)
- Poland (1947–1989)
- Romania (1947–1989, limited participation in Warsaw Pact activities after 1964) (Note: See De-satellization of Communist Romania)
- Soviet Union (1922–1991; previously as the Russian SFSR, 1917–1922)
  - Soviet Byelorussia (1919–1991, UN member state from 1945)
  - Soviet Ukraine (1919–1991, UN member state from 1945)

=== Other communist states ===
- (Democratic Republic of Afghanistan) (Democratic Republic of Afghanistan) Afghanistan (1978–1987)
- Angola (1975–1991)
- Benin (1975–1990)
- Burkina Faso (1983–1987)
- Cambodia (1979–1989)
  - State of Cambodia (1989–1991)
    - Liberated Area of Cambodia (1978-1979)
- China (1949–1961) (Note: See Sino–Soviet split)
  - Liberated Zone of China/Anti-Japanese Base Areas of China (1945-1949)
- Congo (1968–1991)
- Cuba (1959–1991)
- Ethiopia (1987–1991)
  - Provisional Military Government of Socialist Ethiopia (1974–1987)
- Grenada (1979–1983)
- North Korea (1948–1990)
- Laos (1975–1989)
- Madagascar (1975–1990)
- Mongolia (1924–1990)
- Mozambique (1975–1990)
- Seychelles (1977–1991)
- Somalia (1969–1977)
- South Yemen (1969–1990)
- Vietnam (1976–1991)
- Vietnam (1976-1991)
  - Democratic Republic of Vietnam (1950–1976; also known as North Vietnam since 1954)
    - Provisional Revolutionary Government of the Republic of South Vietnam (1969–1976)
- Yugoslavia (1945–1948) (Note: See Tito–Stalin split)

=== Other aligned states ===
States that had communist governments States that the Soviet Union believed at one point to be moving toward socialism Other states allied with the Soviet Union at some point

- Afghanistan (1987-1991)
- Algeria (1962–1991)
  - Provisional Government of the Algerian Republic (1958-1962)
- Bangladesh (1971-1975)
- Burma (1962–1988)
- Burundi (1966–1991)
- Chad (1979–1982) (1990-1991)
- Cape Verde (1975–1990)
- Chile (1970–1973) (Note: Soviet-Chilean alliance ended with the overthrow of the Allende government in a military coup, after which Chile became a Cold War ally of the United States. The Soviet Union would later support an armed insurgency against the military government until Chile returned to democracy in 1990.)
- Comoros (1975–1978)
- Congo (1963-1968)
- (Democratic Republic of the Congo) First Congolese Republic (1960)
- Djibouti (1981–1991)
- Republic of Egypt (1953–1958)
  - United Arab Republic (1958–1971)
    - Arab Republic of Egypt (1971–1974)
- Equatorial Guinea (1968–1979)
- Ghana (1960–1966) (1979-1991)
- Guinea (1960–1984)
- Guinea-Bissau (1973–1991)
  - Liberated Zones of Guinea-Bissau (1963-1974)
- Guyana (1980–1991)
- India (1971–1991)
- Indonesia (1959–1965)
- Iran (1979–1991)
- Republic of Iraq (1958–1963)
  - Nasserist Iraq (1963–1968)
    - Ba'athist Iraq (1968–1979)
- Israel (1948–1953)
- Libyan Arab Republic (1969–1977)
  - Libyan Arab Jamahiriya (1977–1991)
- Mali (1960–1991)
- Mauritania (1961–1984)
- Nicaragua (1979–1990)
- Liberated Areas of Oman (1969-1979)
- Palestine (1988-1991)
- Panama (1968-1981)
- Peru (1968–1975)
- Sahrawi Arab Democratic Republic (1976–1991)
- Sao Tome and Principe (1975–1991)
- Senegal (1960–1981)
- South Yemen (1967-1969)
- Democratic Republic of the Sudan (1969–1971)
  - Republic of the Sudan (1989-1991)
- Suriname (1980–1987) (1990–1991)
- Syria (1957–1958)
  - Nasserist Syria (1958–1961)
    - Ba'athist Syria (1963–1991)
- Tanzania (1964–1991)
- Tunisia (1963-1976)
- First Republic of Uganda (1966–1971)
  - Second Republic of Uganda (1973-1976)
    - Third Republic of Uganda (1979-1980) (1983-1985)
      - Fourth Republic of Uganda (1986-1991)
- North Yemen (1962–1970) (1974-1978)
- Zambia (1964–1991)
- Zimbabwe (1980–1991)

== Foundation history ==
Eastern Bloc Area Border changes 1938 to 1948

In 1922, the Russian SFSR, the Ukrainian SSR, the Byelorussian SSR and the Transcaucasian SFSR approved the Treaty of Creation of the USSR and the Declaration of the Creation of the USSR, forming the Soviet Union. Soviet leader Joseph Stalin, who viewed the Soviet Union as a "socialist island", stated that the Soviet Union must see that "the present capitalist encirclement is replaced by a socialist encirclement".

=== Expansion of the Soviet Union from 1939 to 1940 ===
In 1939, the USSR entered into the Molotov–Ribbentrop Pact with Nazi Germany that contained a secret protocol that divided Romania, Poland, Latvia, Lithuania, Estonia and Finland into German and Soviet spheres of influence. Eastern Poland, Latvia, Estonia, Finland and Bessarabia in northern Romania were recognized as parts of the Soviet sphere of influence. Lithuania was added in a second secret protocol in September 1939.

The Soviet Union had invaded the portions of eastern Poland assigned to it by the Molotov–Ribbentrop Pact two weeks after the German invasion of western Poland, followed by co-ordination with German forces in Poland. During the Occupation of East Poland by the Soviet Union, the Soviets liquidated the Polish state, and a German-Soviet meeting addressed the future structure of the "Polish region". Soviet authorities immediately started a campaign of sovietization of the newly Soviet-annexed areas. Soviet authorities collectivized agriculture, and nationalized and redistributed private and state-owned Polish property.

Initial Soviet occupations of the Baltic countries had occurred in mid-June 1940, when Soviet NKVD troops raided border posts in Lithuania, Estonia and Latvia, followed by the liquidation of state administrations and replacement by Soviet cadres. Elections for parliament and other offices were held with single candidates listed and the official results fabricated, purporting pro-Soviet candidates' approval by 92.8 percent of the voters in Estonia, 97.6 percent in Latvia, and 99.2 percent in Lithuania. The fraudulently installed "people's assemblies" immediately declared each of the three corresponding countries to be "Soviet Socialist Republics" and requested their "admission into Stalin's Soviet Union". This formally resulted in the Soviet Union's annexation of Lithuania, Latvia, and Estonia in August 1940. The international community condemned this annexation of the three Baltic countries and deemed it illegal.

In 1939, the Soviet Union unsuccessfully attempted an invasion of Finland, subsequent to which the parties entered into an interim peace treaty granting the Soviet Union a portion of the eastern region of Karelia (10% of Finnish territory), and the Karelo-Finnish Soviet Socialist Republic was established by merging the ceded territories with the KASSR. After a June 1940 Soviet Ultimatum demanding Bessarabia, Bukovina, and the Hertsa region from Romania, the Soviets entered these areas, Romania caved to Soviet demands and the Soviets occupied the territories.

=== Eastern Front and Allied conferences ===
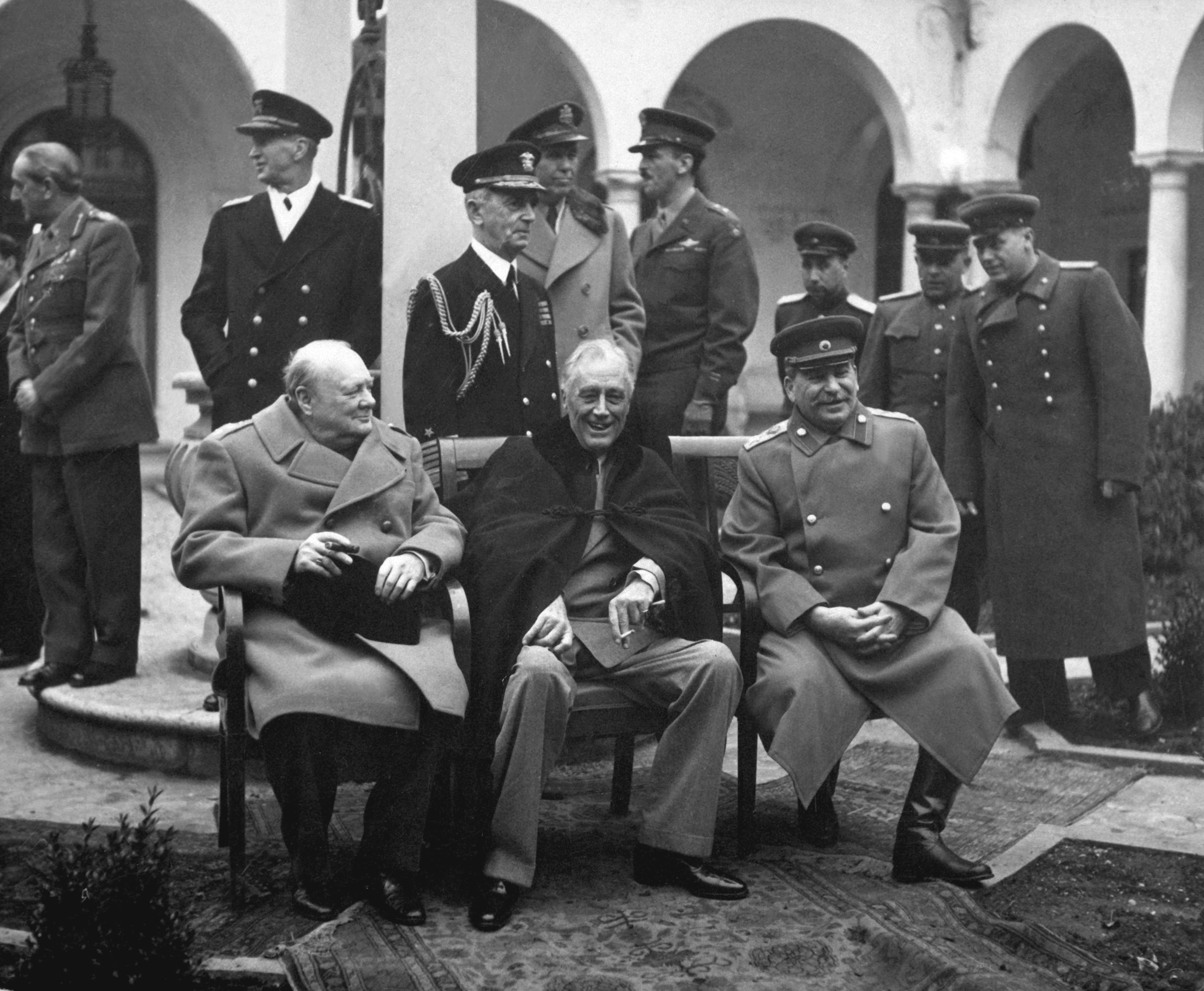
The Big Three (British Prime Minister Winston Churchill, U.S. President Franklin D. Roosevelt and Premier of the Soviet Union Joseph Stalin) at the Yalta Conference, February 1945

In June 22,1941, Germany broke the Molotov-Ribbentrop pact by invading the Soviet Union. From the time of this invasion to 1944, the areas annexed by the Soviet Union were part of Germany's Ostland (except for the Moldavian SSR). Thereafter, the Soviet Union began to push German forces westward through a series of battles on the Eastern Front.

In the aftermath of World War II on the Soviet-Finnish border, the parties signed another peace treaty ceding to the Soviet Union in 1944, followed by a Soviet annexation of roughly the same eastern Finnish territories as those of the prior interim peace treaty as part of the Karelo-Finnish Soviet Socialist Republic.

From 1943 to 1945, several conferences regarding Post-War Europe occurred that, in part, addressed the potential Soviet annexation and control of countries in Central Europe. There were various Allied plans for state order in Central Europe for post-war. While Joseph Stalin tried to get as many states under Soviet control as possible, British Prime Minister Winston Churchill preferred a Central European Danube Confederation to counter these countries against Germany and Russia. Churchill's Soviet policy regarding Central Europe differed vastly from that of American President Franklin D. Roosevelt, with the former believing Soviet leader Stalin to be a "devil"-like tyrant leading a vile system.

When warned of potential domination by a Stalin dictatorship over part of Europe, Roosevelt responded with a statement summarizing his rationale for relations with Stalin: "I just have a hunch that Stalin is not that kind of a man. ... I think that if I give him everything I possibly can and ask for nothing from him in return, noblesse oblige, he won't try to annex anything and will work with me for a world of democracy and peace". While meeting with Stalin and Roosevelt in Tehran in 1943, Churchill stated that Britain was vitally interested in restoring Poland as a politically independent country. Britain did not press the matter for fear that it would become a source of inter-allied friction.

In February 1945, at the conference at Yalta, Stalin demanded a Soviet sphere of political influence in Central Europe. Stalin eventually was convinced by Churchill and Roosevelt not to dismember Germany. Stalin stated that the Soviet Union would keep the territory of eastern Poland they had already taken via invasion in 1939 with some exceptions, and wanted a pro-Soviet Polish government in power in what would remain of Poland. After resistance by Churchill and Roosevelt, Stalin promised a re-organization of the current pro-Soviet government on a broader democratic basis in Poland. He stated that the new government's primary task would be to prepare elections. However, the 1946 Polish people's referendum (known as the "Three Times Yes" referendum) and the subsequent 1947 Polish parliamentary election did not meet democratic standards and were largely manipulated.

The parties at Yalta further agreed that the countries of liberated Europe and former Axis satellites would be allowed to "create democratic institutions of their own choice", pursuant to "the right of all peoples to choose the form of government under which they will live". The parties also agreed to help those countries form interim governments "pledged to the earliest possible establishment through free elections" and "facilitate where necessary the holding of such elections".

At the beginning of the July–August 1945 Potsdam Conference after Germany's unconditional surrender, Stalin repeated previous promises to Churchill that he would refrain from a "sovietization" of Central Europe. In addition to reparations, Stalin pushed for "war booty", which would permit the Soviet Union to directly seize property from conquered nations without quantitative or qualitative limitation. A clause was added permitting this to occur with some limitations.

== Concealed transformation dynamics ==
At first, the Soviets concealed their role in other Eastern Bloc politics, with the transformation appearing as a modification of Western "bourgeois democracy". As a young communist was told in East Germany, "it's got to look democratic, but we must have everything in our control". Stalin felt that socioeconomic transformation was indispensable to establish Soviet control, reflecting the Marxist–Leninist view that material bases, the distribution of the means of production, shaped social and political relations. The Soviet Union also co-opted the Eastern European countries into its sphere of influence by making reference to some cultural commonalities.

Moscow-trained cadres were put into crucial power positions to fulfill orders regarding sociopolitical transformation. Elimination of the bourgeoisie's social and financial power by expropriation of landed and industrial property was accorded absolute priority. These measures were publicly billed as "reforms" instead of socioeconomic transformations. Except for initially in Czechoslovakia, activities by political parties had to adhere to "Bloc politics", with parties eventually having to accept membership in an "antifascist bloc" obliging them to act only by mutual "consensus". The bloc system permitted the Soviet Union to exercise domestic control indirectly.

Crucial departments such as those responsible for personnel, general police, secret police and youth were strictly Communist run. Moscow cadres distinguished "progressive forces" from "reactionary elements" and rendered both powerless. Such procedures were repeated until Communists had gained unlimited power and only politicians who were unconditionally supportive of Soviet policy remained.

== Early events prompting stricter control ==
=== Marshall Plan rejection ===
Political situation in Europe during the Cold War

In June 1947, after the Soviets had refused to negotiate a potential lightening of restrictions on German development, the United States announced the Marshall Plan, a comprehensive program of American assistance to all European countries wanting to participate, including the Soviet Union and those of Eastern Europe. The Soviets rejected the Plan and took a hard-line position against the United States and non-communist European nations. However, Czechoslovakia was eager to accept the US aid; the Polish government had a similar attitude, and this was of great concern to the Soviets.

In one of the clearest signs of Soviet control over the region up to that point, the Czechoslovak foreign minister, Jan Masaryk, was summoned to Moscow and berated by Stalin for considering joining the Marshall Plan. Polish Prime minister Józef Cyrankiewicz was rewarded for the Polish rejection of the Plan with a huge 5-year trade agreement, including $450 million in credit, 200,000 tons of grain, heavy machinery and factories.

In July 1947, Stalin ordered these countries to pull out of the Paris Conference on the European Recovery Programme, which has been described as "the moment of truth" in the post-World War II division of Europe. Thereafter, Stalin sought stronger control over other Eastern Bloc countries, abandoning the prior appearance of democratic institutions. When it appeared that, in spite of heavy pressure, non-communist parties might receive in excess of 40% of the vote in the August 1947 Hungarian elections, repressions were instituted to liquidate any independent political forces.

In that same month, annihilation of the opposition in Bulgaria began on the basis of continuing instructions by Soviet cadres. At a late September 1947 meeting of all communist parties in Szklarska Poręba, Eastern Bloc communist parties were blamed for permitting even minor influence by non-communists in their respective countries during the run up to the Marshall Plan.

=== Berlin blockade and airlift ===
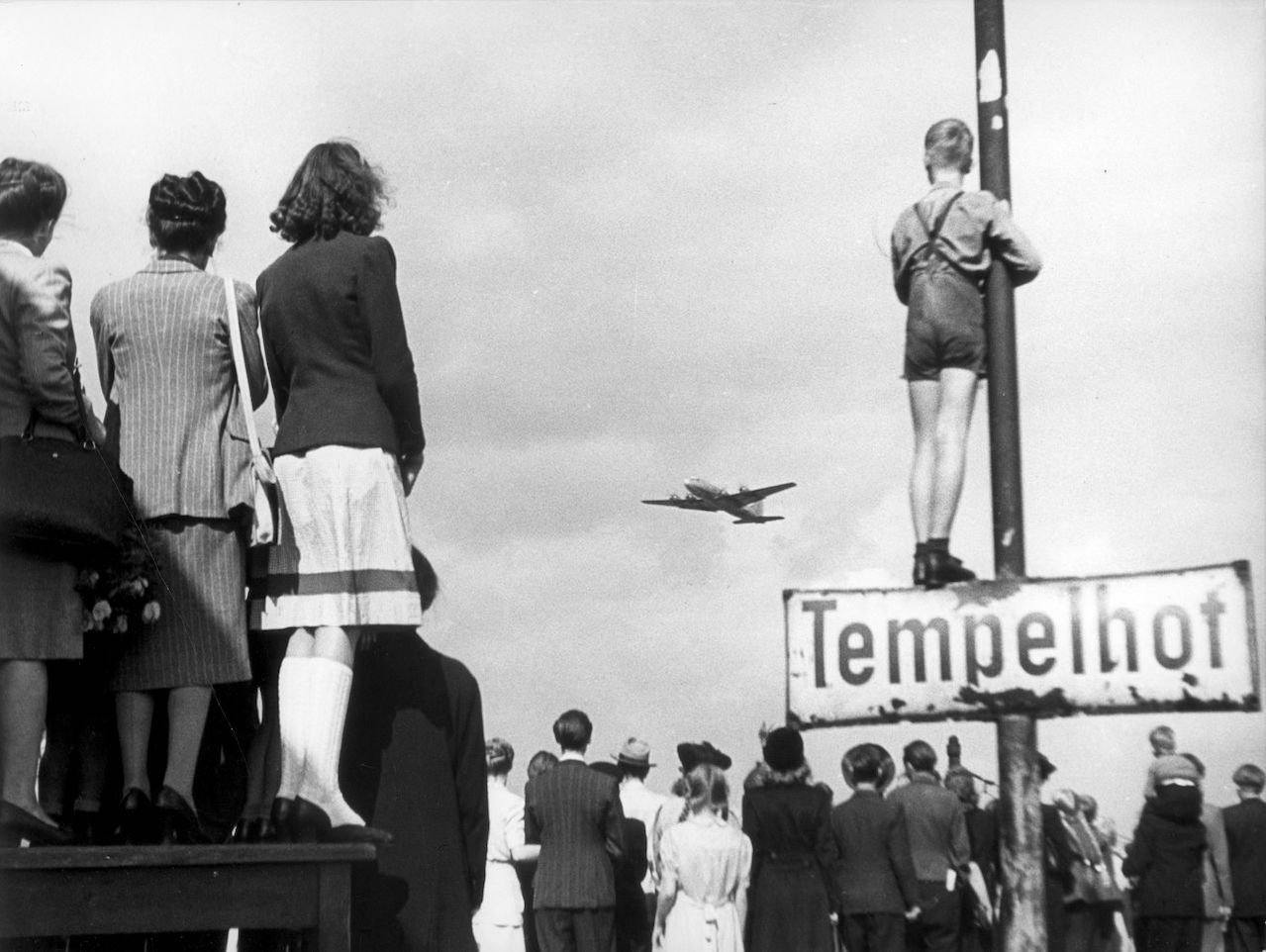
German civilians watching Western supply planes at Berlin Tempelhof Airport during the Berlin Airlift

In the former German capital Berlin, surrounded by Soviet-occupied Germany, Stalin instituted the Berlin Blockade on 24 June 1948, preventing food, materials and supplies from arriving in West Berlin. The blockade was caused, in part, by early local elections of October 1946 in which the Socialist Unity Party of Germany (SED) was rejected in favor of the Social Democratic Party, which had gained two and a half times more votes than the SED. The United States, Britain, France, Canada, Australia, New Zealand and several other countries began a massive "Berlin airlift", supplying West Berlin with food and other supplies.

The Soviets mounted a public relations campaign against the western policy change and communists attempted to disrupt the elections of 1948 preceding large losses therein, while 300,000 Berliners demonstrated and urged the international airlift to continue. In May 1949, Stalin lifted the blockade, permitting the resumption of Western shipments to Berlin.

=== Tito–Stalin split ===
After disagreements between Yugoslav leader Josip Broz Tito and the Soviet Union regarding Greece and Albania, a Tito–Stalin split occurred, followed by Yugoslavia being expelled from the Cominform in June 1948 and a brief failed Soviet putsch in Belgrade. The split created two separate communist forces in Europe. A vehement campaign against Titoism was immediately started in the Eastern Bloc, describing agents of both the West and Tito in all places as engaging in subversive activity.

Stalin ordered the conversion of the Cominform into an instrument to monitor and control the internal affairs of other Eastern Bloc parties. He also briefly considered converting the Cominform into an instrument for sentencing high-ranking deviators, but dropped the idea as impractical. Instead, a move to weaken communist party leaders through conflict was started. Soviet cadres in communist party and state positions in the Bloc were instructed to foster intra-leadership conflict and to transmit information against each other. This accompanied a continuous stream of accusations of "nationalistic deviations", "insufficient appreciation of the USSR's role", links with Tito and "espionage for Yugoslavia". This resulted in the persecution of many major party cadres, including those in East Germany.

The first country to experience this approach was Albania, where leader Enver Hoxha immediately changed course from favoring Yugoslavia to opposing it. In Poland, leader Władysław Gomułka, who had previously made pro-Yugoslav statements, was deposed as party secretary-general in early September 1948 and subsequently jailed. In Bulgaria, when it appeared that Traicho Kostov, who was not a Moscow cadre, was next in line for leadership, in June 1949, Stalin ordered Kostov's arrest, followed soon thereafter by a death sentence and execution. A number of other high ranking Bulgarian officials were also jailed. Stalin and Hungarian leader Mátyás Rákosi met in Moscow to orchestrate a show trial of Rákosi opponent László Rajk, who was thereafter executed. The preservation of the Soviet bloc relied on maintaining a sense of ideological unity that would entrench Moscow's influence in Eastern Europe as well as the power of the local Communist elites.

The port city of Trieste was a particular focus after the Second World War. Until the break between Tito and Stalin, the Western powers and the Eastern bloc faced each other uncompromisingly. The neutral buffer state Free Territory of Trieste, founded in 1947 with the United Nations, was split up between Italy and Yugoslavia in 1954 and officially dissolved in the 1970s, also because of the détente between the West and Tito.

== Politics ==
Countries which once had overtly Marxist–Leninist governments in bright red and countries the USSR considered at one point to be "moving toward socialism" in orange

Despite the initial institutional design of communism implemented by Joseph Stalin in the Eastern Bloc, subsequent development varied across countries. In satellite states, after peace treaties were initially concluded, opposition was essentially liquidated, fundamental steps towards socialism were enforced, and Kremlin leaders sought to strengthen control therein. Right from the beginning, Stalin directed systems that rejected Western institutional characteristics of market economies, capitalist parliamentary democracy (dubbed "bourgeois democracy" in Soviet parlance) and the rule of law subduing discretional intervention by the state. The resulting states aspired to total control of a political center backed by an extensive and active repressive apparatus, and a central role of Marxist–Leninist ideology.

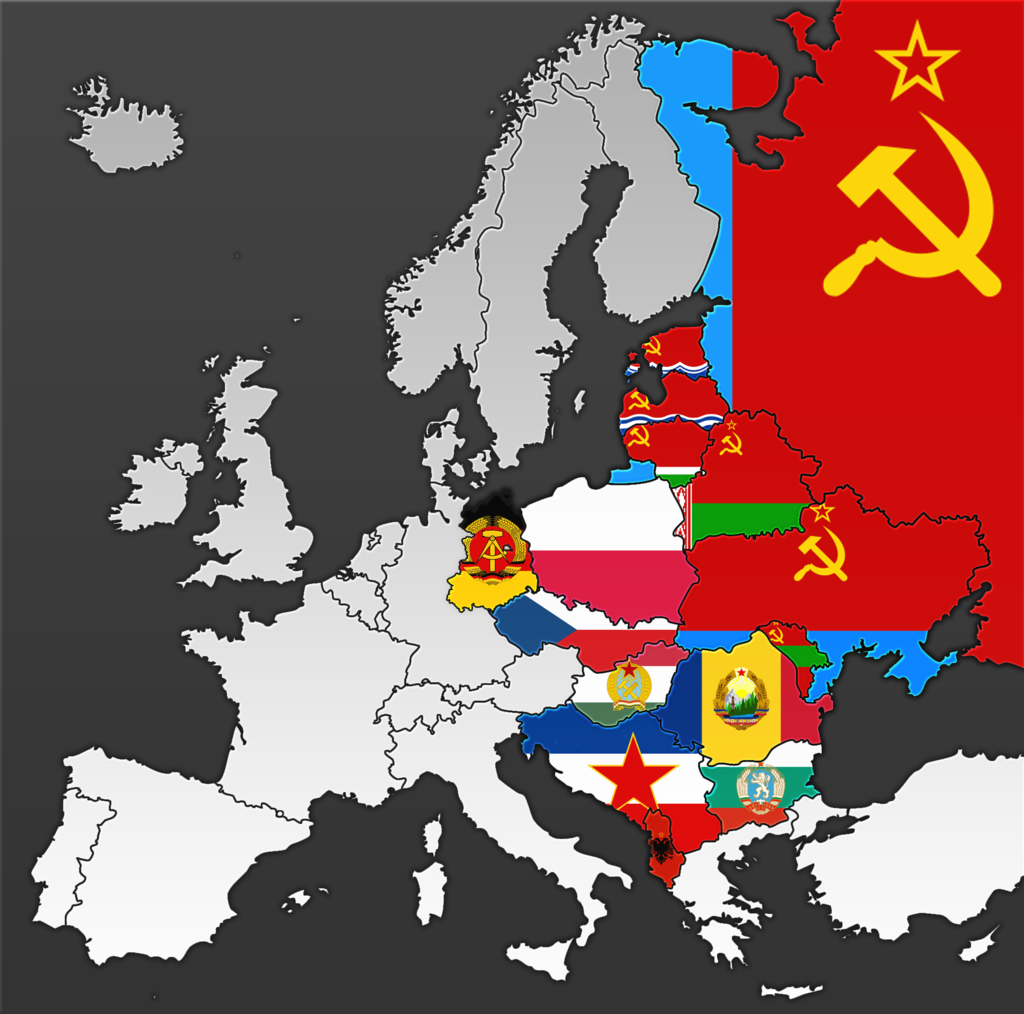
Communist countries and Soviet republics in Europe with their representative flags (1950s)

However, the vestiges of democratic institutions were never entirely destroyed, resulting in the façade of democratic-style institutions such as supreme state organ of power, which effectively just rubber-stamped decisions made by rulers, and communist state constitutions, to which adherence by authorities was limited or non-existent. Parliaments were still elected, but their meetings occurred only a few days per year, only to legitimize politburo decisions, and so little attention was paid to them that some of those serving were actually dead, and officials would openly state that they would seat members who had lost elections.

The first or General Secretary of the central committee in each communist party was the most powerful figure. The party over which the politburo held sway was not a mass party but, conforming with Leninist tradition, a smaller selective party of between three and fourteen percent of the country's population who had accepted total obedience. Those who secured membership in this selective group received considerable rewards, such as access to special lower priced shops with a greater selection of high-quality domestic and/or foreign goods (confections, alcohol, cigars, cameras, televisions, and the like), special schools, holiday facilities, homes, high-quality domestic and/or foreign-made furniture, works of art, pensions, permission to travel abroad, and official cars with distinct license plates so that police and others could identify these members from a distance.

=== Political and civil restrictions ===
In addition to emigration restrictions, civil society, defined as a domain of political action outside the party's state control, was not allowed to firmly take root, with the possible exception of Poland in the 1980s. While the institutional design of the communist systems were based on the rejection of rule of law, the legal infrastructure was not immune to change reflecting decaying ideology and the substitution of autonomous law. Initially, communist parties were small in all countries except Czechoslovakia, such that there existed an acute shortage of politically "trustworthy" persons for administration, police, and other professions. Thus, "politically unreliable" non-communists initially had to fill such roles. Those not obedient to communist authorities were ousted, while Moscow cadres started a large-scale party programs to train personnel who would meet political requirements. Former members of the middle-class were officially discriminated against, though the state's need for their skills and certain opportunities to re-invent themselves as good Communist citizens did allow many to nonetheless achieve success.

Communist governments in the Eastern Bloc viewed marginal groups of opposition intellectuals as a potential threat because of the bases underlying Communist power therein. The suppression of dissidence and opposition was considered a central prerequisite to retain power, though the enormous expense at which the population in certain countries were kept under secret surveillance may not have been rational. Following a totalitarian initial phase, a post-totalitarian period followed the death of Stalin in which the primary method of Communist rule shifted from mass terror to selective repression, along with ideological and sociopolitical strategies of legitimation and the securing of loyalty. Juries were replaced by a tribunal of professional judges and two lay assessors that were dependable party actors.

The police deterred and contained opposition to party directives. The political police served as the core of the system, with their names becoming synonymous with raw power and the threat of violent retribution should an individual become active against the State. Several state police and secret police organizations enforced communist party rule, including the following:

- Soviet Union – KGB
- East Germany – Stasi, Volkspolizei and KdA
- Czechoslovakia – STB and LM
- Bulgaria – KDS, usually referred to as just "Darzhavna sigurnost" ("State Security")
- Albania – Sigurimi
- Yugoslavia – UDBA
- Hungary – ÁVH and Munkásőrség
- Romania – Securitate and GP
- Poland – Urząd Bezpieczeństwa, Służba Bezpieczeństwa and ZOMO

=== Media and information restrictions ===
Announcement of martial law in Poland by Trybuna Ludu,14 December 1981

The press in the communist period was an organ of the state, completely reliant on and subservient to the communist party. Before the late 1980s, Eastern Bloc radio and television organizations were state-owned, while print media was usually owned by political organizations, mostly by the local communist party. Youth newspapers and magazines were owned by youth organizations affiliated with communist parties.

The control of the media was exercised directly by the communist party itself, and by state censorship, which was also controlled by the party. Media served as an important form of control over information and society. The dissemination and portrayal of knowledge were considered by authorities to be vital to communism's survival by stifling alternative concepts and critiques. Several state Communist Party newspapers were published, including:

- Central newspapers of the Soviet Union
- Trybuna Ludu (Poland)
- Czerwony Sztandar (Vilnius) (1953–1990), Polish-language newspaper in Lithuanian SSR
- Népszabadság (until 1956 Szabad Nép, Hungary)
- Neues Deutschland (East Germany)
- Rabotnichesko Delo (Bulgaria)
- Rudé právo (Czechoslovakia)
- Rahva Hääl (annexed former Estonia)
- Pravda (Slovakia)
- Kauno diena (annexed former Lithuania)
- Scînteia (Romania)
- Zvyazda (Belarus).

The Telegraph Agency of the Soviet Union (TASS) served as the central agency for collection and distribution of internal and international news for all Soviet newspapers, radio and television stations. It was frequently infiltrated by Soviet intelligence and security agencies, such as the NKVD and GRU. TASS had affiliates in 14 Soviet republics, including the Lithuanian SSR, Latvian SSR, Estonian SSR, Moldavian SSR. Ukrainian SSR and Byelorussian SSR.

Western countries invested heavily in powerful transmitters which enabled services such as the BBC, VOA and Radio Free Europe (RFE) to be heard in the Eastern Bloc, despite attempts by authorities to jam the airways.

=== Cooperation in Space ===
In April 1967, the Soviet space program founded the Interkosmos program, built to increase cooperation in space between Soviet aligned socialist nations, although this program included crew members from Non-Aligned nations such as India and Austria Interkosmos provided technical assistance, as well as being a launch provider for Eastern Bloc satellites

The first crewed Interkosmos flight lifted off from Baikonur Cosmodrome on the 2nd of March 1978, carrying two Cosmonauts: Soviet Aleksei Gubarev and Czech Vladimír Remek to the Salyut 6 Space Station The pair occupied the station for 7 days before returning to earth on the 10th of March. Soyuz-28 was the first crewed space flight to include crew not from the United States or the Soviet Union.

From 1967 to 1991, the Soviet Union launched 18 Interkosmos missions, drawing crew from primarily Eastern Bloc nations including:

- Bulgaria
- Czechoslovakia
- East Germany
- Hungary
- Mongolia
- Poland
- Romania

== Religion ==
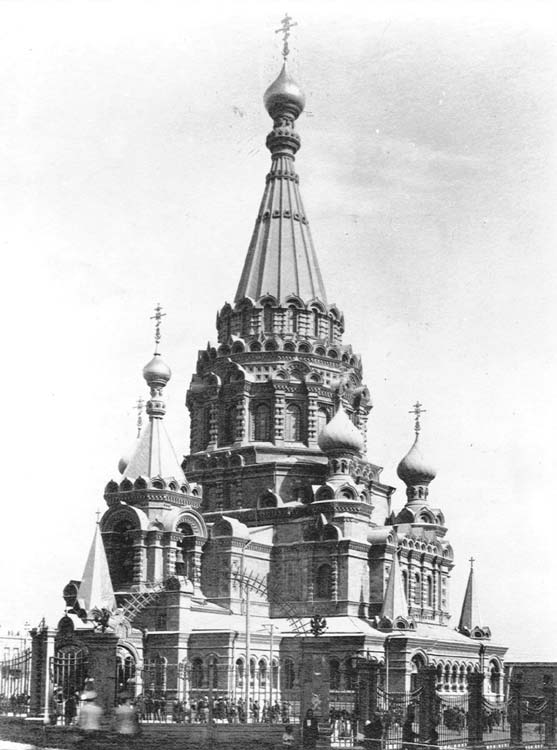
The Alexander Nevsky Cathedral, once the most dominant landmark in Baku, was demolished in the 1930s under Stalin.

Under the state atheism of many Eastern Bloc nations, religion was actively suppressed. Since some of these states tied their ethnic heritage to their national churches, both the peoples and their churches were targeted by the Soviets.

== Organizations ==
In 1949, the Soviet Union, Bulgaria, Czechoslovakia, Hungary, Poland, and Romania founded the Comecon in accordance with Stalin's desire to enforce Soviet domination of the lesser states of Central Europe and to mollify some states that had expressed interest in the Marshall Plan, and which were now, increasingly, cut off from their traditional markets and suppliers in Western Europe. The Comecon's role became ambiguous because Stalin preferred more direct links with other party chiefs than the Comecon's indirect sophistication; it played no significant role in the 1950s in economic planning. Initially, the Comecon served as cover for the Soviet taking of materials and equipment from the rest of the Eastern Bloc, but the balance changed when the Soviets became net subsidizers of the rest of the Bloc by the 1970s via an exchange of low cost raw materials in return for shoddily manufactured finished goods.

In 1955, the Warsaw Pact was formed partly in response to NATO's inclusion of West Germany and partly because the Soviets needed an excuse to retain Red Army units in Hungary. For 35 years, the Pact perpetuated the Stalinist concept of Soviet national security based on imperial expansion and control over satellite governments in Eastern Europe. This Soviet formalization of their security relationships in the Eastern Bloc reflected Moscow's basic security policy principle that continued presence in East Central Europe was a foundation of its defense against the West. Through its institutional structures, the Pact also compensated in part for the absence of Joseph Stalin's personal leadership since his death in 1953. The Pact consolidated the other Bloc members' armies in which Soviet officers and security agents served under a unified Soviet command structure.

Beginning in 1964, Romania took a more independent course. While it did not repudiate either Comecon or the Warsaw Pact, it ceased to play a significant role in either. Nicolae Ceaușescu's assumption of leadership one year later pushed Romania even further in the direction of separateness. Albania, which had become increasingly isolated under Enver Hoxha following de-Stalinization, undergoing an Albanian–Soviet split in 1961, withdrew from the Warsaw Pact in 1968 following the Warsaw Pact invasion of Czechoslovakia.

== Emigration restrictions and defectors ==
In 1917, Russia restricted emigration by instituting passport controls and forbidding the exit of belligerent nationals. In 1922, after the Treaty on the Creation of the USSR, both the Ukrainian SSR and the Russian SFSR issued general rules for travel that foreclosed virtually all departures, making legal emigration impossible. Border controls thereafter strengthened such that, by 1928, even illegal departure was effectively impossible. This later included internal passport controls, which when combined with individual city Propiska ("place of residence") permits, and internal freedom of movement restrictions often called the 101st kilometre, greatly restricted mobility within even small areas of the Soviet Union.

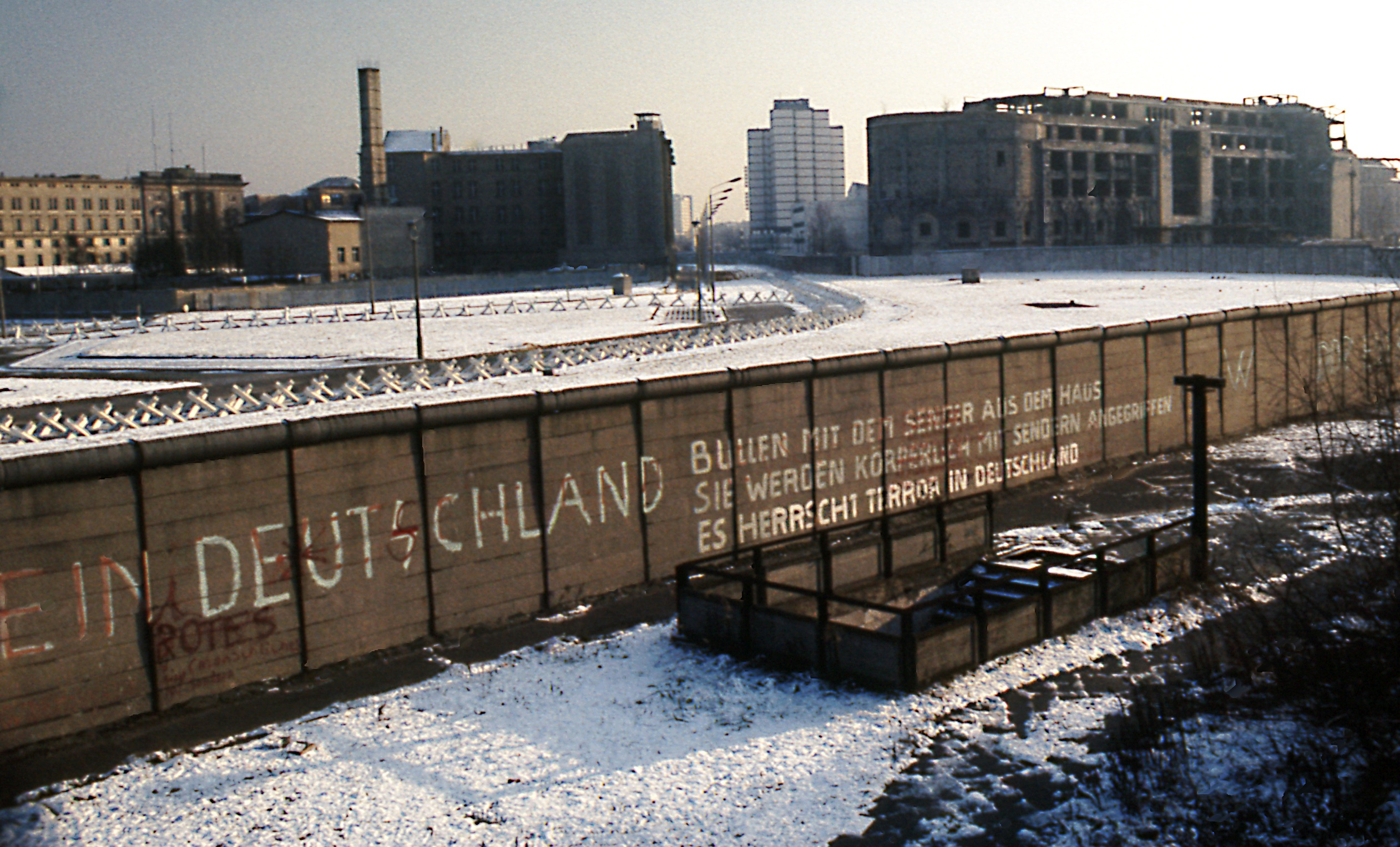
The Berlin Wall in 1975

After the creation of the Eastern Bloc, emigration out of the newly occupied countries, except under limited circumstances, was effectively halted in the early 1950s, with the Soviet approach to controlling national movement emulated by most of the rest of the Eastern Bloc. However, in East Germany, taking advantage of the Inner German border between occupied zones, hundreds of thousands fled to West Germany, with figures totaling 197,000 in 1950, 165,000 in 1951, 182,000 in 1952 and 331,000 in 1953. One reason for the sharp 1953 increase was fear of potential further Sovietization with the increasingly paranoid actions of Joseph Stalin in late 1952 and early 1953. 226,000 had fled in just the first six months of 1953.

With the closing of the Inner German border officially in 1952, the Berlin city sector borders remained considerably more accessible than the rest of the border because of their administration by all four occupying powers. Accordingly, it effectively comprised a "loophole" through which Eastern Bloc citizens could still move west. The 3.5 million East Germans that had left by 1961, called Republikflucht, totaled approximately 20% of the entire East German population. In August 1961, East Germany erected a barbed-wire barrier that would eventually be expanded through construction into the Berlin Wall, effectively closing the loophole.

With virtually non-existent conventional emigration, more than 75% of those emigrating from Eastern Bloc countries between 1950 and 1990 did so under bilateral agreements for "ethnic migration". About 10% were refugee migrants under the Geneva Convention of 1951. Most Soviets allowed to leave during this time period were ethnic Jews permitted to emigrate to Israel after a series of embarrassing defections in 1970 caused the Soviets to open very limited ethnic emigrations. The fall of the Iron Curtain was accompanied by a massive rise in European East-West migration. Famous Eastern Bloc defectors included Joseph Stalin's daughter Svetlana Alliluyeva, who denounced Stalin after her 1967 defection.

== Population ==
Eastern Bloc countries such as the Soviet Union had high rates of population growth. In 1917, the population of Russia in its present borders was 91 million. Despite the destruction in the Russian Civil War, the population grew to 92.7 million in 1926. In 1939, the population increased by 17 percent to 108 million. Despite more than 20 million deaths suffered throughout World War II, Russia's population grew to 117.2 million in 1959. The Soviet census of 1989 showed Russia's population at 147 million people.

The Soviet economical and political system produced further consequences such as, for example, in Baltic states, where the population was approximately half of what it should have been compared with similar countries such as Denmark, Finland and Norway over the years 1939–1990. Poor housing was one factor leading to severely declining birth rates throughout the Eastern Bloc. However, birth rates were still higher than in Western European countries. A reliance upon abortion, in part because periodic shortages of birth control pills and intrauterine devices made these systems unreliable, also depressed the birth rate and forced a shift to pro-natalist policies by the late 1960s, including severe checks on abortion and propagandist exhortations like the 'heroine mother' distinction bestowed on those Romanian women who bore ten or more children.

In October 1966, artificial birth control was proscribed in Romania and regular pregnancy tests were mandated for women of child-bearing age, with severe penalties for anyone who was found to have terminated a pregnancy. Despite such restrictions, birth rates continued to lag, in part because of unskilled induced abortions. The populations of the Eastern Bloc countries were as follows:

Eastern Bloc population
Country	Area (000s)	1950 (mil)	1970 (mil)	1980 (mil)	1985 (mil)	Annual growth (1950–1985)	Density (1980)
Albania	28.7 km^{2} (11.1 sq mi)	1.22	2.16	2.59	2.96	+4.07%	90.2/km^{2}
Bulgaria	110.9 km^{2} (42.8 sq mi)	7.27	8.49	8.88	8.97	+0.67%	80.1/km^{2}
Czechoslovakia	127.9 km^{2} (49.4 sq mi)	13.09	14.47	15.28	15.50	+0.53%	119.5/km^{2}
Hungary	93.0 km^{2} (35.9 sq mi)	9.20	10.30	10.71	10.60	+0.43%	115.2/km^{2}
East Germany	108.3 km^{2} (41.8 sq mi)	17.94	17.26	16.74	16.69	−0.20%	154.6/km^{2}
Poland	312.7 km^{2} (120.7 sq mi)	24.82	30.69	35.73	37.23	+1.43%	114.3/km^{2}
Romania	237.5 km^{2} (91.7 sq mi)	16.31	20.35	22.20	22.73	+1.12%	93.5/km^{2}
Soviet Union	22,300 km^{2} (8,600 sq mi)	182.32	241.72	265.00	272.00	+1.41%	11.9/km^{2}
Yugoslavia	255.8 km^{2} (98.8 sq mi)	16.34	20.4	22.36	23.1	+1.15%	92.6/km^{2}

== Social structure ==
Eastern Bloc societies operated under anti-meritocratic principles with strong egalitarian elements. For example, Czechoslovakia favoured less qualified individuals, as well as providing privileges for the nomenklatura and those with the right class or political background. Eastern Bloc societies were dominated by the ruling communist party, dubbed "partyocracy" by Pavel Machonin. Former members of the middle-class were officially discriminated against, though the need for their skills allowed them to re-invent themselves as good communist citizens.

Transforming the social structure was one of the main goals of education policy. Following the Soviet example, Czechoslovakia, Poland and other socialist states abolished tuition fees and private schools, and sought to have each social class represented in secondary and higher education in proportion to its share of the population. A new intelligentsia was to be drawn from the working class and the peasantry, and the social origin of applicants was subject to political scrutiny during admission. In Hungary, members of the former interwar middle class could be barred from university by quotas that favoured working-class students. This class-based exclusion from universities and workplaces officially ended only in the early 1960s. In Czechoslovakia and Poland, positive discrimination was not rigorously applied, and higher education institutions resisted it. Of those who graduated from higher education in Poland between 1945 and 1973, 34% came from working-class families, 23% from peasant families, 40% from intelligentsia families and 3% from the former middle or upper classes. In both countries, small income differences meant that education brought few financial rewards, and relatively well-paid workers had little interest in it. Studies of Czechoslovakia and Poland found no long-term decrease in inequality of access to education, and such inequalities in socialist countries were no lower than in the West.

== Housing ==
A housing shortage existed throughout the Eastern Bloc. In Europe it was primarily due to the devastation during World War II. Construction efforts suffered after a severe cutback in state resources available for housing starting in 1975. Cities became filled with large system-built apartment blocks Housing construction policy suffered from considerable organisational problems. Moreover, completed houses possessed noticeably poor quality finishes.

=== Housing quality ===
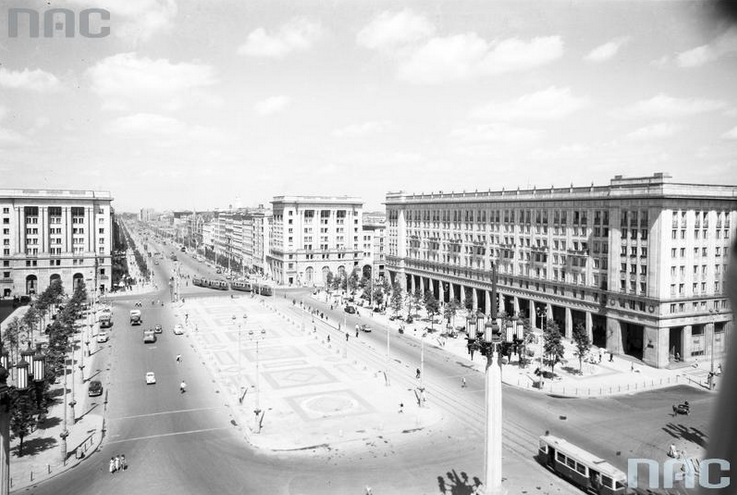
Prominent examples of urban design included Marszałkowska Housing Estate (MDM) in Warsaw.

The near-total emphasis on large apartment blocks was a common feature of Eastern Bloc cities in the 1970s and 1980s. East German authorities viewed large cost advantages in the construction of Plattenbau apartment blocks such that the building of such architecture on the edge of large cities continued until the dissolution of the Eastern Bloc. Buildings such as the Paneláks of Czechoslovakia and Panelház of Hungary. Wishing to reinforce the role of the state in the 1970s and 1980s, Nicolae Ceaușescu enacted the systematisation programme, which consisted of the demolition and reconstruction of existing hamlets, villages, towns, and cities, in whole or in part, in order to make place to standardised apartment blocks across the country (blocuri). Under this ideology, Ceaușescu built Centrul Civic of Bucharest in the 1980s, which contains the Palace of the Parliament, in the place of the former historic center.

Even by the late 1980s, sanitary conditions in most Eastern Bloc countries were generally far from adequate. For all countries for which data existed, 60% of dwellings had a density of greater than one person per room between 1966 and 1975. The average in western countries for which data was available approximated 0.5 persons per room. Problems were aggravated by poor quality finishes on new dwellings often causing occupants to undergo a certain amount of finishing work and additional repairs.

Housing quality in the Eastern Bloc by the 1980s
Country	Adequate sanitation % (year)	Piped water %	Central heating %	Inside toilet %	More than 1 person/room %
Albania	n/a	n/a	n/a	n/a	n/a
Bulgaria	n/a	66.1%	7.5%	28.0%	60.2%
Czechoslovakia	60.5% (1983)	75.3%	30.9%	52.4%	67.9%
East Germany	70.0% (1985)	82.1%	72.2%	43.4%	n/a
Hungary	60.0% (1984)	64% (1980)	n/a	52.5% (1980)	64.4%
Poland	50.0% (1980)	47.3%	22.2%	33.4%	83.0%
Romania	50.0% (1980)	12.3% (1966)	n/a	n/a	81.5%
Soviet Union	50.0% (1980)	n/a	n/a	n/a	n/a
Yugoslavia	69.8% (1981)	93.2%	84.2%	89.7%	83.1%

Housing quality in Hungary (1949–1990)
Year	Houses/flats total	With piped water	With sewage disposal	With inside toilet	With piped gas
1949	2,466,514	420,644 (17.1%)	–	306,998 (12.5%)	174,186 (7.1%)
1960	2,757,625	620,600 (22.5%)	–	440,737 (16%)	373,124 (13.5%)
1970	3,118,096	1,370,609 (44%)	1,167,055 (37.4%)	838,626 (26.9%)	1,571,691 (50.4%)
1980	3,542,418	2,268,014 (64%)	2,367,274 (66.8%)	1,859,677 (52.5%)	2,682,143 (75.7%)
1990	3,853,288	3,209,930 (83.3%)	3,228,257 (83.8%)	2,853,834 (74%)	3,274,514 (85%)

The worsening shortages of the 1970s and 1980s occurred during an increase in the quantity of dwelling stock relative to population from 1970 to 1986. Even for new dwellings, average dwelling size was only 61.3 m^{2} (660 sq ft) in the Eastern Bloc compared with 113.5 m^{2} (1,222 sq ft) in ten western countries for which comparable data was available. Space standards varied considerably, with the average new dwelling in the Soviet Union in 1986 being only 68% the size of its equivalent in Hungary. Apart from exceptional cases, such as East Germany in 1980–1986 and Bulgaria in 1970–1980, space standards in newly built dwellings rose before the dissolution of the Eastern Bloc. Housing size varied considerably across time, especially after the oil crisis in the Eastern Bloc; for instance, 1990-era West German homes had an average floor space of 83 m^{2} (890 sq ft), compared to an average dwelling size in the GDR of 67 m^{2} (720 sq ft) in 1967.

Housing characteristics in new dwellings of the Eastern Bloc
	Floor space/dwelling			People/dwelling	
Country	1970	1980	1986	1970	1986
Western Bloc	113.5 m^{2} (1,222 sq ft)			n/a	n/a
Albania	n/a	n/a	n/a	n/a	n/a
Bulgaria	63.7 m^{2} (686 sq ft)	59.0 m^{2} (635 sq ft)	66.9 m^{2} (720 sq ft)	3.8	2.8
Czechoslovakia	67.2 m^{2} (723 sq ft)	73.8 m^{2} (794 sq ft)	81.8 m^{2} (880 sq ft)	3.4	2.7
East Germany	55.0 m^{2} (592 sq ft)	62.7 m^{2} (675 sq ft)	61.2 m^{2} (659 sq ft)	2.9	2.4
Hungary	61.5 m^{2} (662 sq ft)	67.0 m^{2} (721 sq ft)	83.0 m^{2} (893 sq ft)	3.4	2.7
Poland	54.3 m^{2} (584 sq ft)	64.0 m^{2} (689 sq ft)	71.0 m^{2} (764 sq ft)	4.2	3.5
Romania	44.9 m^{2} (483 sq ft)	57.0 m^{2} (614 sq ft)	57.5 m^{2} (619 sq ft)	3.6	2.8
Soviet Union	46.8 m^{2} (504 sq ft)	52.3 m^{2} (563 sq ft)	56.8 m^{2} (611 sq ft)	4.1	3.2
Yugoslavia	59.2 m^{2} (637 sq ft)	70.9 m^{2} (763 sq ft)	72.5 m^{2} (780 sq ft)	n/a	3.4

Poor housing was one of the four major factors (others being poor living conditions, increased female employment and abortion as an encouraged means of birth control) which led to declining birth rates throughout the Eastern Bloc.

== Economies ==
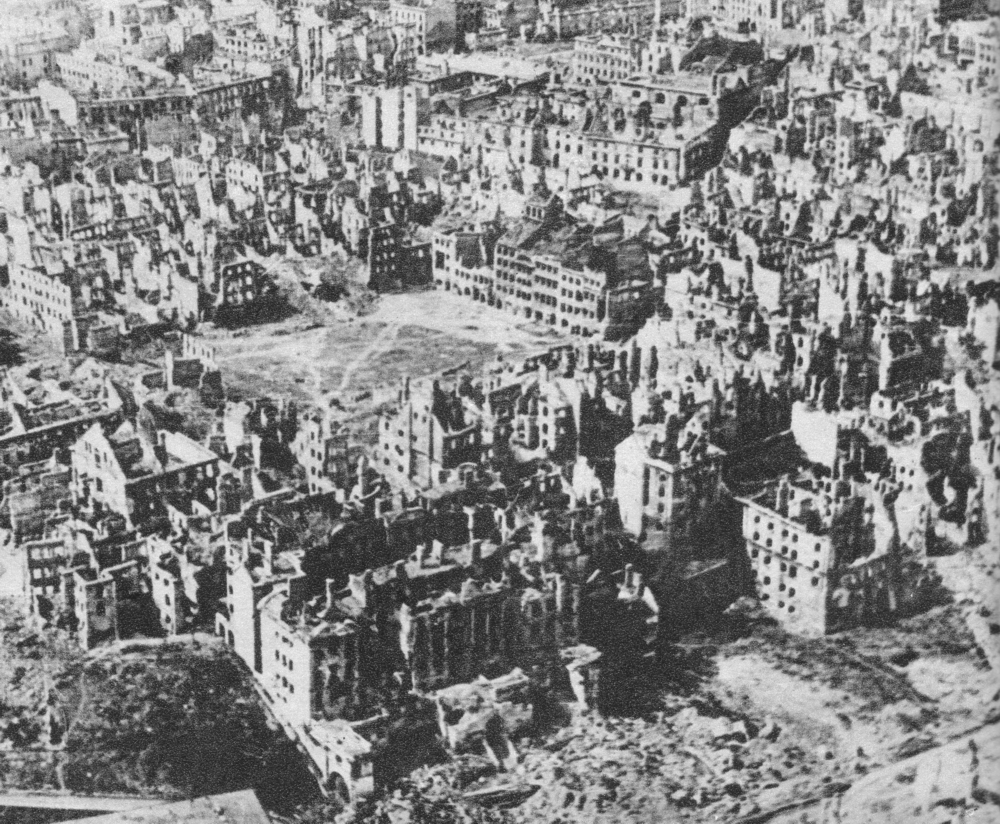
During World War II, 85% of buildings in Warsaw were destroyed by German troops.

Because of the lack of market signals, Eastern Bloc economies experienced mis-development by central planners. The Eastern Bloc also depended upon the Soviet Union for significant amounts of materials.

Technological backwardness resulted in dependency on imports from Western countries and this, in turn, in demand for Western currency. Eastern Bloc countries were heavily borrowing from Club de Paris (central banks) and London Club (private banks) and most of them by the early 1980s were forced to notify the creditors of their insolvency. This information was however kept secret from the citizens and propaganda promoted the view that the countries were on the best way to socialism.

=== Social conditions ===
As a consequence of World War II and the German occupations in Eastern Europe, much of the region had been subjected to enormous destruction of industry, infrastructure and loss of civilian life. In Poland alone the policy of plunder and exploitation inflicted enormous material losses to Polish industry (62% of which was destroyed), agriculture, infrastructure and cultural landmarks, the cost of which has been estimated as approximately €525 billion or $640 billion in 2004 exchange values.

Throughout the Eastern Bloc, both in the USSR and the rest of the Bloc, Russia was given prominence and referred to as the naiboleye vydayushchayasya natsiya (the most prominent nation) and the rukovodyashchiy narod (the leading people). The Soviets promoted the reverence of Russian actions and characteristics, and the construction of Soviet structural hierarchies in the other countries of the Eastern Bloc.

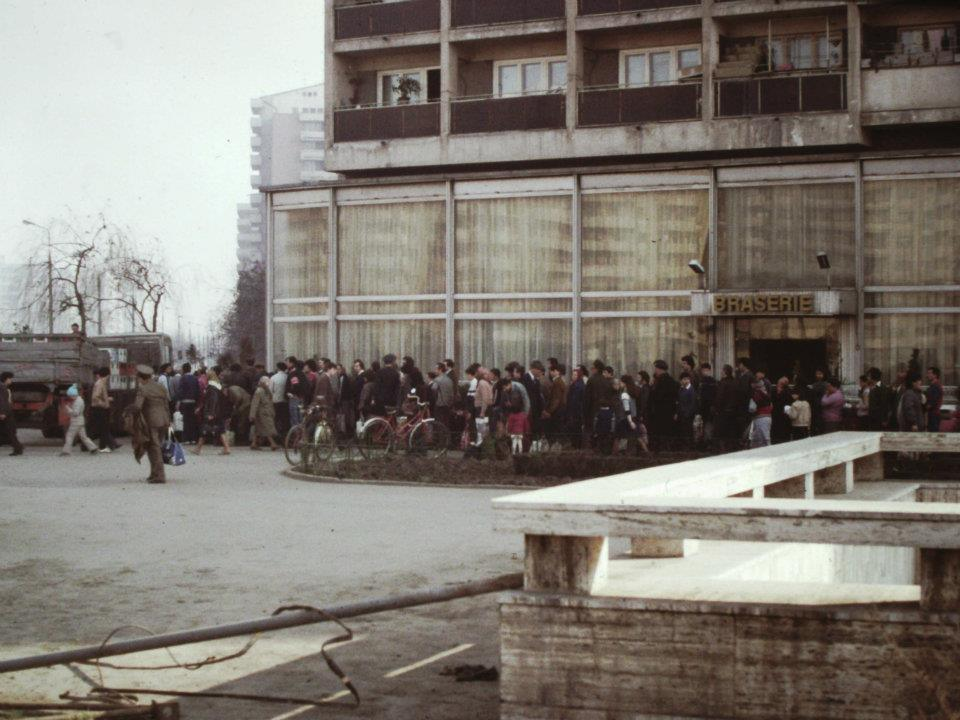
A line for distribution of cooking oil in Bucharest, Romania, May 1986

The defining characteristic of Stalinist totalitarianism was the unique symbiosis of the state with society and the economy, resulting in politics and economics losing their distinctive features as autonomous and distinguishable spheres. Initially, Stalin directed systems that rejected Western institutional characteristics of market economies, democratic governance (dubbed "bourgeois democracy" in Soviet parlance) and the rule of law subduing discretional intervention by the state.

The Soviets mandated expropriation and etatisation of private property. The Soviet-style "replica regimes" that arose in the Bloc not only reproduced the Soviet command economy, but also adopted the brutal methods employed by Joseph Stalin and Soviet-style secret polices to suppress real and potential opposition.

Socialist governments in the Eastern Bloc saw even marginal groups of opposition intellectuals as a potential threat because of the bases underlying Soviet power therein. The suppression of dissent and opposition was a central prerequisite for the security of power within the Eastern Bloc, though the degree of opposition and dissident suppression varied by country and time throughout the Eastern Bloc.

In addition, media in the Eastern Bloc were organs of the state, completely reliant on and subservient to the government of the USSR with radio and television organisations being state-owned, while print media was usually owned by political organisations, mostly by the local party. While over 15 million Eastern Bloc residents migrated westward from 1945 to 1949, emigration was effectively halted in the early 1950s, with the Soviet approach to controlling national movement emulated by most of the rest of the Eastern Bloc.

=== Initial changes ===
==== Transformations billed as reforms ====
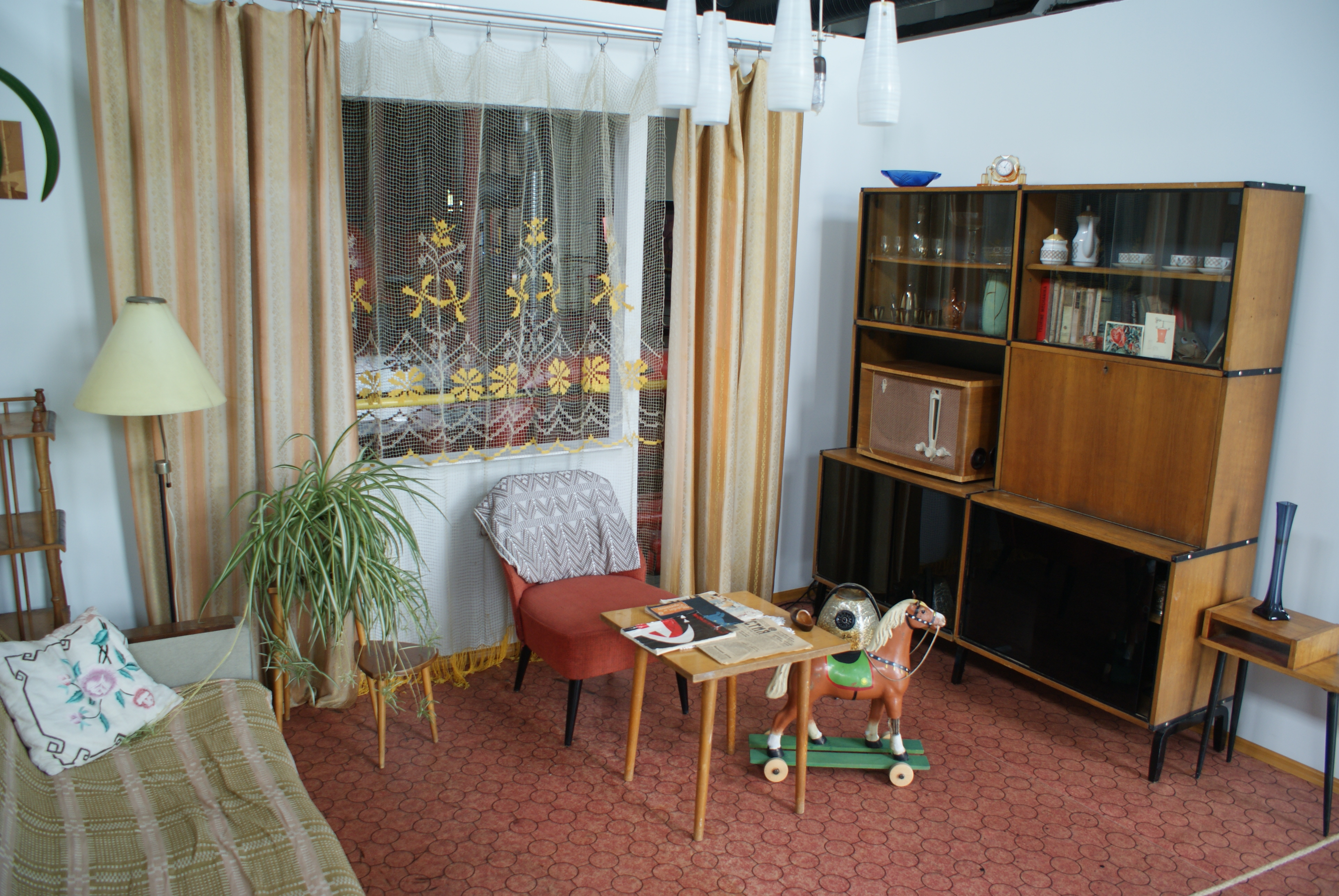
Reconstruction of a typical working class flat interior in a khrushchyovka

In the USSR, because of strict Soviet secrecy under Joseph Stalin, for many years after World War II, even the best informed foreigners did not effectively know about the operations of the Soviet economy. Stalin had sealed off outside access to the Soviet Union since 1935 (and until his death), effectively permitting no foreign travel inside the Soviet Union such that outsiders did not know of the political processes that had taken place therein. During this period, and even for 25 years after Stalin's death, the few diplomats and foreign correspondents permitted inside the Soviet Union were usually restricted to within a few kilometres of Moscow, their phones were tapped, their residences were restricted to foreigner-only locations and they were constantly followed by Soviet authorities.

The Soviets also modeled economies in the rest of Eastern Bloc outside the Soviet Union along Soviet command economy lines. Before World War II, the Soviet Union used draconian procedures to ensure compliance with directives to invest all assets in state planned manners, including the collectivisation of agriculture and utilising a sizeable labor army collected in the gulag system. This system was largely imposed on other Eastern Bloc countries after World War II. While propaganda of proletarian improvements accompanied systemic changes, terror and intimidation of the consequent ruthless Stalinism obfuscated feelings of any purported benefits.

Stalin felt that socioeconomic transformation was indispensable to establish Soviet control, reflecting the Marxist–Leninist view that material bases, the distribution of the means of production, shaped social and political relations. Moscow trained cadres were put into crucial power positions to fulfill orders regarding sociopolitical transformation. Elimination of the bourgeoisie's social and financial power by expropriation of landed and industrial property was accorded absolute priority.

These measures were publicly billed as reforms instead of socioeconomic transformations. Throughout the Eastern Bloc, except for Czechoslovakia, "societal organisations" such as trade unions and associations representing various social, professional and other groups, were erected with only one organisation for each category, with competition excluded. Those organisations were managed by Soviet cadres, though during the initial period, they allowed for some diversity.

==== Asset relocation ====
At the same time, at the war's end, the Soviet Union adopted a "plunder policy" of physically transporting and relocating east European industrial assets to the Soviet Union. Eastern Bloc states were required to provide coal, industrial equipment, technology, rolling stock and other resources to reconstruct the Soviet Union. Between 1945 and 1953, the Soviets received a net transfer of resources from the rest of the Eastern Bloc under this policy of roughly $14 billion, an amount comparable to the net transfer from the United States to western Europe in the Marshall Plan. "Reparations" included the dismantling of railways in Poland and Romanian reparations to the Soviets between 1944 and 1948 valued at $1.8 billion concurrent with the domination of SovRoms.

In addition, the Soviets re-organised enterprises as joint-stock companies in which the Soviets possessed the controlling interest. Using that control vehicle, several enterprises were required to sell products at below world prices to the Soviets, such as uranium mines in Czechoslovakia and East Germany, coal mines in Poland, and oil wells in Romania.

==== Trade and Comecon ====
The trading pattern of the Eastern Bloc countries was severely modified. Before World War II, no greater than 1%–2% of those countries' trade was with the Soviet Union. By 1953, the share of such trade had jumped to 37%. In 1947, Joseph Stalin had also denounced the Marshall Plan and forbade all Eastern Bloc countries from participating in it.

Soviet dominance further tied other Eastern Bloc economies to Moscow via the Council for Mutual Economic Assistance (CMEA) or Comecon, which determined countries' investment allocations and the products that would be traded within Eastern Bloc. Although Comecon was initiated in 1949, its role became ambiguous because Stalin preferred more direct links with other party chiefs than the indirect sophistication of the council. It played no significant role in the 1950s in economic planning.

Initially, Comecon served as cover for the Soviet taking of materials and equipment from the rest of the Eastern Bloc, but the balance changed when the Soviets became net subsidisers of the rest of the Bloc by the 1970s via an exchange of low cost raw materials in return for shoddily manufactured finished goods. While resources such as oil, timber and uranium initially made gaining access to other Eastern Bloc economies attractive, the Soviets soon had to export Soviet raw materials to those countries to maintain cohesion therein. Following resistance to Comecon plans to extract Romania's mineral resources and heavily utilise its agricultural production, Romania began to take a more independent stance in 1964. While it did not repudiate Comecon, it took no significant role in its operation, especially after the rise to power of Nicolae Ceauşescu.

=== Heavy industry emphasis ===
According to Soviet state statistics and period reports, the era saw widespread access to free housing, health care, and higher education, with housing rents averaging under 3% of family income. Apartment rent on average amounted to only 1 percent of the family budget, a figure which reached 4 percent when municipal services are factored in. Tram tickets were 20 kopecks, and a loaf of bread was 15 kopecks. The average monthly salary of an engineer was 140–160 rubles.

The Soviet Union made major progress in developing the country's consumer goods sector. In 1970, the USSR produced 679 million pairs of leather footwear, compared to 534 million for the United States. Czechoslovakia, which had the world's highest per-capita production of shoes, exported a significant portion of its shoe production to other countries.

According to official statistics, the rising standard of living under socialism led to a steady decrease in the workday and an increase in leisure. In 1974, the average workweek for Soviet industrial workers was 40 hours. Paid vacations in 1968 reached a minimum of 15 workdays. In the mid-1970s the number of free days per year-days off, holidays and vacations was 128–130, almost double the figure from the previous ten years.

Because of the lack of market signals in such economies, they experienced mis-development by central planners resulting in those countries following a path of extensive (large mobilisation of inefficiently used capital, labor, energy and raw material inputs) instead of intensive (efficient resource use) development to attempt to achieve quick growth. The Eastern Bloc countries were required to follow the Soviet model overemphasising heavy industry at the expense of light industry and other sectors.

Since that model involved the prodigal exploitation of natural and other resources, it has been described as a kind of "slash and burn" modality. While the Soviet system strove for a dictatorship of the proletariat, there was little existing proletariat in many eastern European countries, such that to create one, heavy industry needed to be built. Each system shared the distinctive themes of state-directed economies, including poorly defined property rights, a lack of market clearing prices and overblown or distorted productive capacities in comparison with corresponding market economies.

Major errors and waste occurred in the resource allocation and distribution systems. Because of the party-run monolithic state organs, these systems provided no effective mechanisms or incentives to control costs, profligacy, inefficiency and waste. Heavy industry was given priority because of its importance for the military-industrial establishment and for the engineering sector.

Factories were sometimes inefficiently located, incurring high transport costs, while poor plant-organisation sometimes resulted in production hold-ups and knock-on effects in other industries dependent on monopoly suppliers of intermediates. For example, each country, including Albania, built steel mills regardless of whether they lacked the requisite resource of energy and mineral ores. A massive metallurgical plant was built in Bulgaria despite the fact that its ores had to be imported from the Soviet Union and transported 320 kilometres (200 mi) from the port at Burgas. A Warsaw tractor factory in 1980 had a 52-page list of unused rusting, then useless, equipment.

This emphasis on heavy industry diverted investment from the more practical production of chemicals and plastics. In addition, the plans' emphasis on quantity, not quality, made Eastern Bloc products less competitive in the world market. High costs passed through the product chain boosted the 'value' of production on which wage increases were based, but made exports less competitive. Planners rarely closed old factories even when new capacities opened elsewhere. For example, the Polish steel industry retained a plant in Upper Silesia despite the opening of modern integrated units on the periphery while the last old Siemens-Martin process furnace installed in the 19th century was not closed down immediately.

Producer goods were favoured over consumer goods, causing consumer goods to be lacking in quantity and quality in the shortage economies that resulted.

By the mid-1970s, budget deficits rose considerably and domestic prices widely diverged from the world prices, while production prices averaged 2% higher than consumer prices. Many premium goods could be bought either in a black market or only in special stores using foreign currency generally inaccessible to most Eastern Bloc citizens, such as Intershop in East Germany, Beryozka in the Soviet Union, Pewex in Poland, Tuzex in Czechoslovakia, Corecom in Bulgaria, or Comturist in Romania. Much of what was produced for the local population never reached its intended user, while many perishable products became unfit for consumption before reaching their consumers.

=== Black markets ===
As a result of the deficiencies of the official economy, black markets were created that were often supplied by goods stolen from the public sector. The second, "parallel economy" flourished throughout the Bloc because of rising unmet state consumer needs. Black and gray markets for foodstuffs, goods, and cash arose. Goods included household goods, medical supplies, clothes, furniture, cosmetics and toiletries in chronically short supply through official outlets.

Many farmers concealed actual output from purchasing agencies to sell it illicitly to urban consumers. Hard foreign currencies were highly sought after, while highly valued Western items functioned as a medium of exchange or bribery in countries such as Romania, where Kent cigarettes served as an unofficial extensively used currency to buy goods and services. Some service workers moonlighted illegally providing services directly to customers for payment.

=== Urbanization ===
The extensive production industrialization that resulted was not responsive to consumer needs and caused a neglect in the service sector, unprecedented rapid urbanization, acute urban overcrowding, chronic shortages, and massive recruitment of women into mostly menial and/or low-paid occupations. The consequent strains resulted in the widespread used of coercion, repression, show trials, purges, and intimidation. By 1960, massive urbanisation occurred in Poland (48% urban) and Bulgaria (38%), which increased employment for peasants, but also caused illiteracy to skyrocket when children left school for work.

Cities became massive building sites, resulting in the reconstruction of some war-torn buildings but also the construction of drab, dilapidated, system-built apartment blocks. Urban living standards plummeted because resources were tied up in huge long-term building projects, while industrialization forced millions of former peasants to live in hut camps or grim apartment blocks close to massive polluting industrial complexes.

=== Agricultural collectivization ===
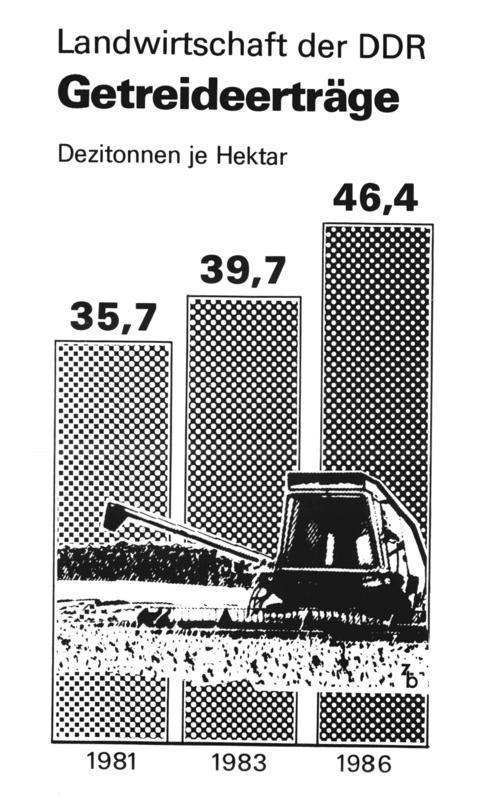
Graphic showing change in East German agricultural production between 1981 and 1986

Collectivization is a process pioneered by Joseph Stalin in the late 1920s by which Marxist–Leninist governments in the Eastern Bloc and elsewhere attempted to establish an ordered socialist system in rural agriculture. It required the forced consolidation of small-scale peasant farms and larger holdings belonging to the landed classes for the purpose of creating larger modern "collective farms" owned, in theory, by the workers therein. In reality, such farms were owned by the state.

In addition to eradicating the perceived inefficiencies associated with small-scale farming on discontiguous land holdings, collectivization also purported to achieve the political goal of removing the rural basis for resistance to communist governance. A further justification given was the need to promote industrial development by facilitating the state's procurement of agricultural products and transferring "surplus labor" from rural to urban areas. In short, agriculture was reorganized in order to proletarianize the peasantry and control production at prices determined by the state.

The Eastern Bloc possesses substantial agricultural resources, especially in southern areas, such as Hungary's Great Plain, which offered good soils and a warm climate during the growing season. Rural collectivization proceeded differently in non-Soviet Eastern Bloc countries than it did in the Soviet Union in the 1920s and 1930s. Because of the need to conceal the assumption of control and the realities of an initial lack of control, no Soviet dekulakisation-style liquidation of rich peasants could be carried out in the non-Soviet Eastern Bloc countries.

Nor could they risk mass starvation or agricultural sabotage (e.g., holodomor) with a rapid collectivization through massive state farms and agricultural producers' cooperatives (APCs). Instead, collectivization proceeded more slowly and in stages from 1948 to 1960 in Bulgaria, Romania, Hungary, Czechoslovakia, and East Germany, and from 1955 to 1964 in Albania. Collectivization in the Baltic republics of the Lithuanian SSR, Estonian SSR and Latvian SSR took place between 1947 and 1952.

Unlike Soviet collectivization, neither massive destruction of livestock nor errors causing distorted output or distribution occurred in the other Eastern Bloc countries. More widespread use of transitional forms occurred, with differential compensation payments for peasants that contributed more land to APCs. Because Czechoslovakia and East Germany were more industrialized than the Soviet Union, they were in a position to furnish most of the equipment and fertilizer inputs needed to ease the transition to collectivized agriculture. Instead of liquidating large farmers or barring them from joining APCs as Stalin had done through dekulakisation, those farmers were utilised in the non-Soviet Eastern Bloc collectivizations, sometimes even being named farm chairman or managers.

Collectivisation often met with strong rural resistance, including peasants frequently destroying property instead of surrendering it to the collectives. Strong peasant links with the land through private ownership were broken and many young people left for careers in industry. In Poland and Yugoslavia, fierce resistance from peasants, many of whom had resisted the Axis, led to the abandonment of wholesale rural collectivisation in the early 1950s. In part because of the problems created by collectivisation, agriculture was largely de-collectivised in Poland in 1957.

The fact that Poland nevertheless managed to carry out large-scale centrally planned industrialisation with no more difficulty than its collectivised Eastern Bloc neighbours further called into question the need for collectivisation in such planned economies. Only Poland's "western territories", those eastwardly adjacent to the Oder-Neisse line that were annexed from Germany, were substantially collectivised, largely in order to settle large numbers of Poles on good farmland which had been taken from German farmers.

=== Economic growth ===
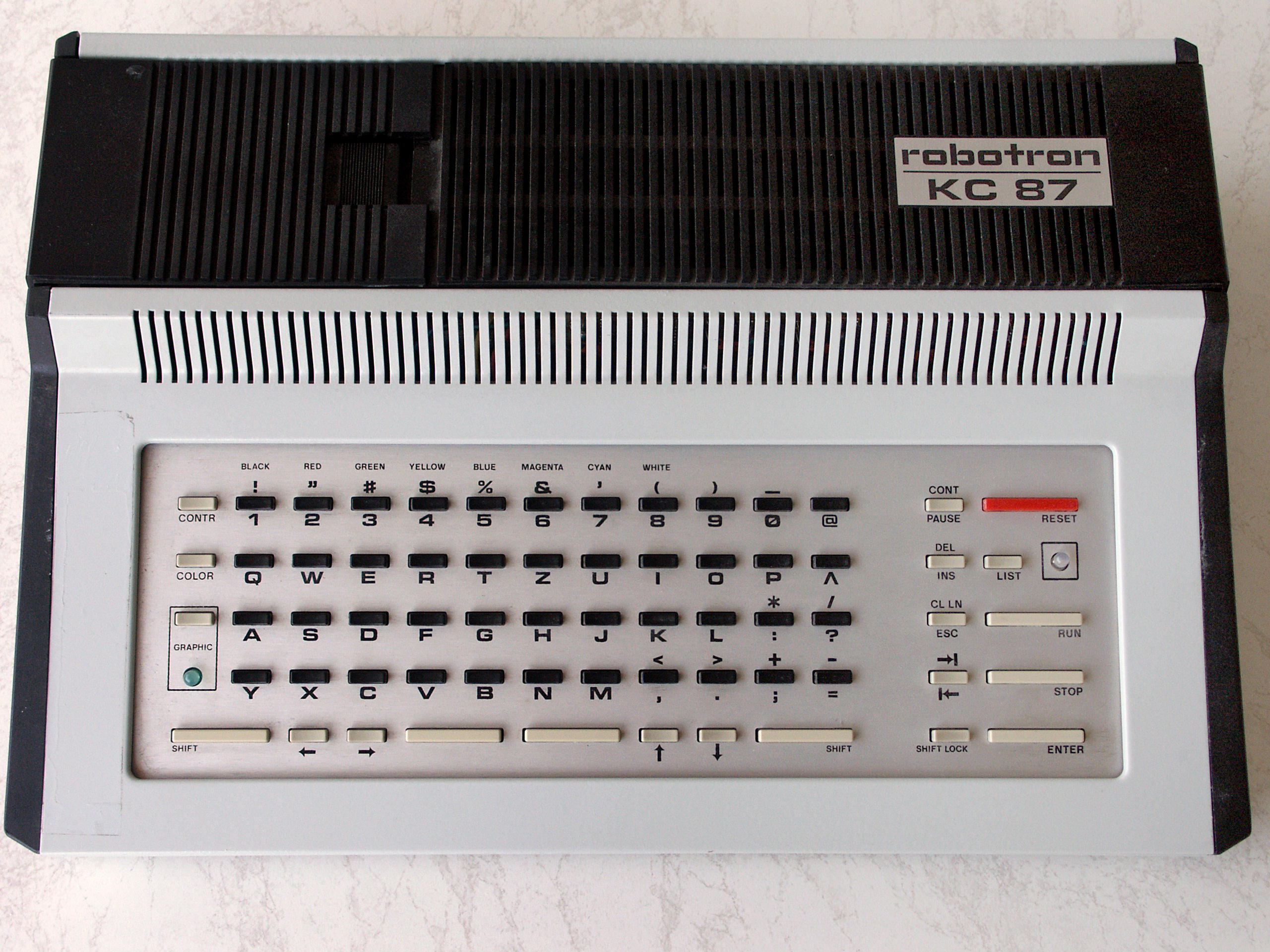
A Robotron KC 87 home computer made in East Germany between 1987 and 1989

Official Soviet statistics from the era state that the USSR reached first place in Europe and second globally in combined industrial and agricultural output by 1980, with reported industrial output rising from 55% of the US level in 1960 to over 80% in 1980.

With the change of the Soviet leadership in 1964, there were significant changes made to economic policy. The Government on 30 September 1965 issued a decree "On improving the management of industry" and the 4 October 1965 resolution "On improving and strengthening the economic incentives for industrial production". The main initiator of these reforms was Premier Alexei Kosygin. Kosygin's reforms on agriculture gave considerable autonomy to the collective farms, giving them the right to the contents of private farming. During this period, there was the large-scale land reclamation program, the construction of irrigation channels, and other measures. In the period 1966–1970, the gross national product grew by over 35%. Industrial output increased by 48% and agriculture by 17%. In the eighth Five-Year Plan, the national income grew at an average rate of 7.8%. In the ninth Five-Year Plan (1971–1975), the national income grew at an annual rate of 5.7%. In the tenth Five-Year Plan (1976–1981), the national income grew at an annual rate of 4.3%.

The Soviet Union made noteworthy scientific and technological progress. Unlike countries with more market-oriented economies, scientific and technological potential in the USSR was used in accordance with a plan on the scale of society as a whole.

In 1980, the number of scientific personnel in the USSR was 1.4 million. The number of engineers employed in the national economy was 4.7 million. Between 1960 and 1980, the number of scientific personnel increased by a factor of 4. In 1975, the number of scientific personnel in the USSR amounted to one-fourth of the total number of scientific personnel in the world. In 1980, as compared with 1940, the number of invention proposals submitted was more than 5 million. In 1980, there were 10 all-Union research institutes, 85 specialised central agencies, and 93 regional information centres.

The world's first nuclear power plant was commissioned on 27 June 1954 in Obninsk. Soviet scientists made a major contribution to the development of computer technology. The first major achievements in the field were associated with the building of analog computers. In the USSR, principles for the construction of network analysers were developed by S. Gershgorin in 1927 and the concept of the electrodynamic analog computer was proposed by N. Minorsky in 1936. In the 1940s, the development of AC electronic antiaircraft directors and the first vacuum-tube integrators was begun by L. Gutenmakher. In the 1960s, important developments in modern computer equipment were the BESM-6 system built under the direction of S. A. Lebedev, the MIR series of small digital computers, and the Minsk series of digital computers developed by G.Lopato and V. Przhyalkovsky.

Author Turnock claims that transport in the Eastern Bloc was characterised by poor infrastructural maintenance. The road network suffered from inadequate load capacity, poor surfacing and deficient roadside servicing. While roads were resurfaced, few new roads were built and there were very few divided highway roads, urban ring roads or bypasses. Private car ownership remained low by Western standards.

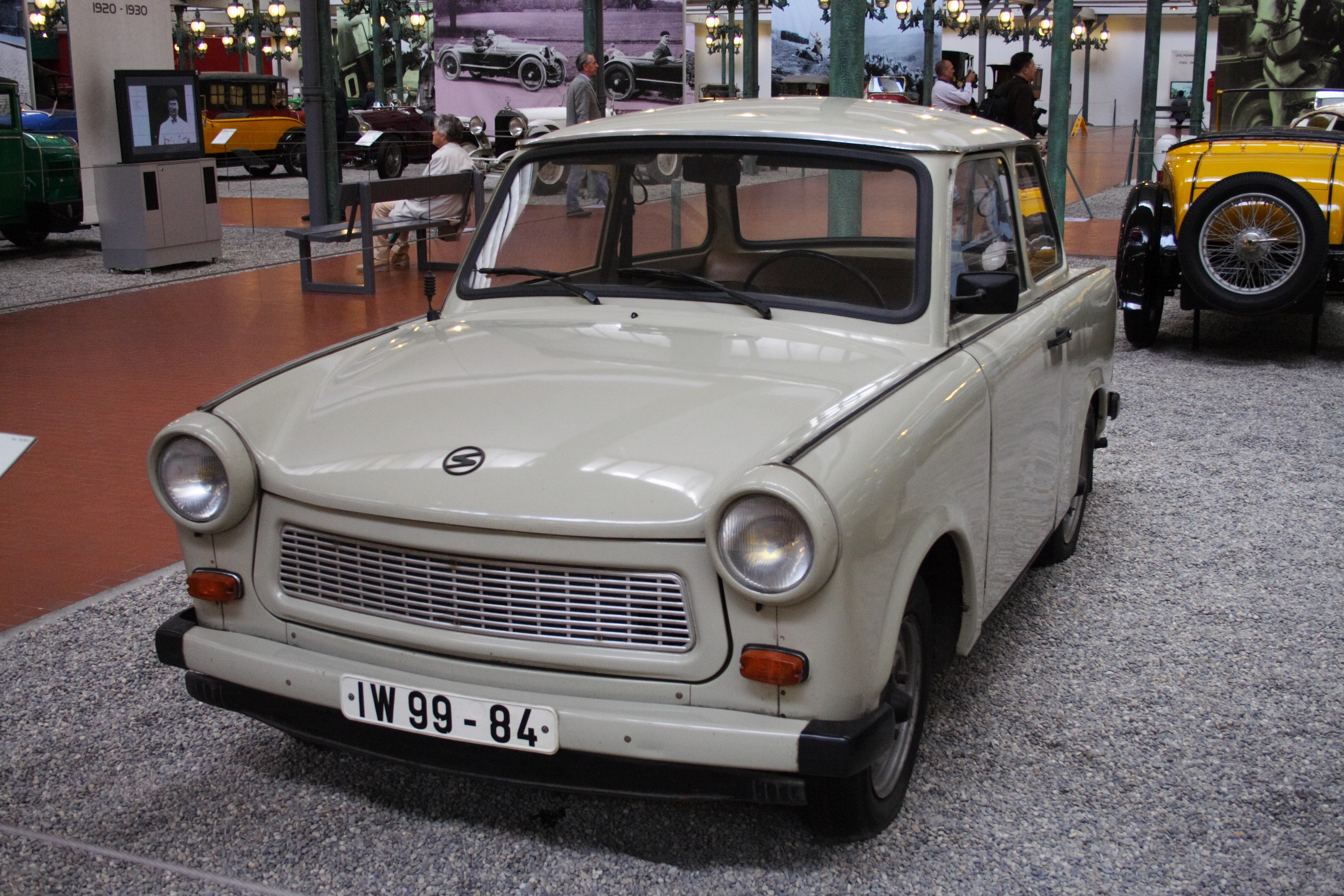
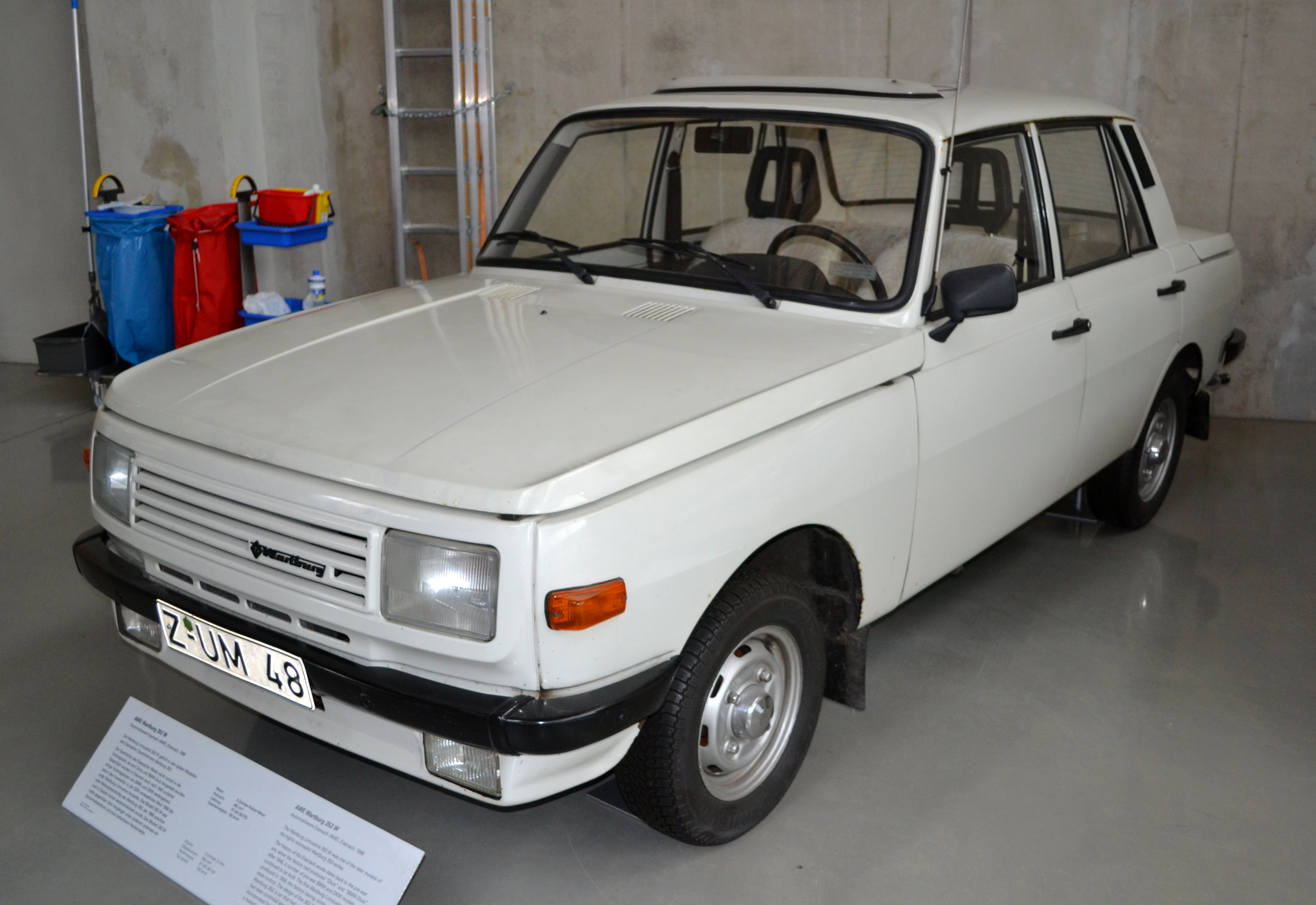
A Trabant 601 Limousine (left), manufactured between 1964 and 1989; and a Wartburg 353 (right), manufactured between 1966 and 1989; they were made in East Germany and exported throughout the Eastern Bloc.
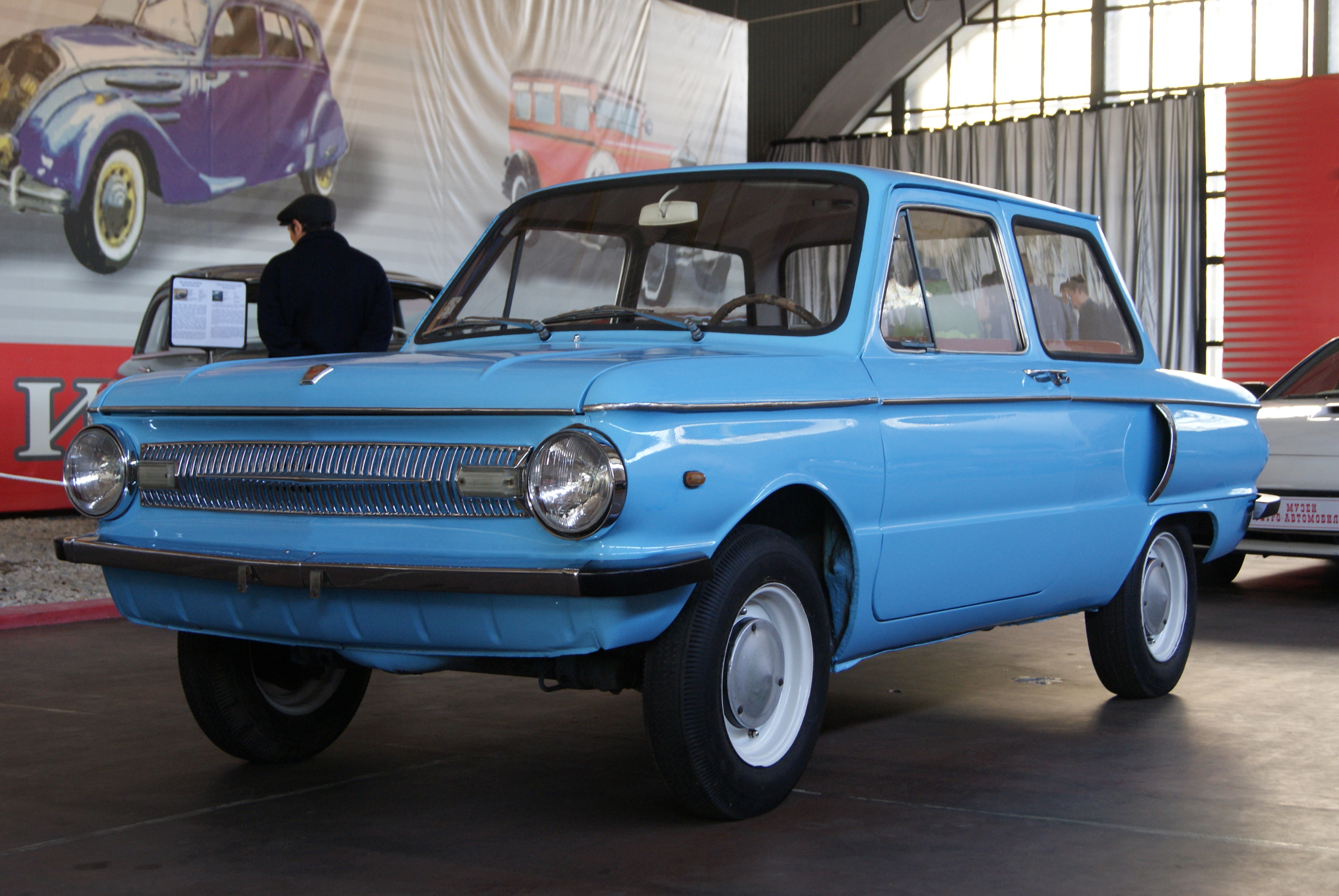
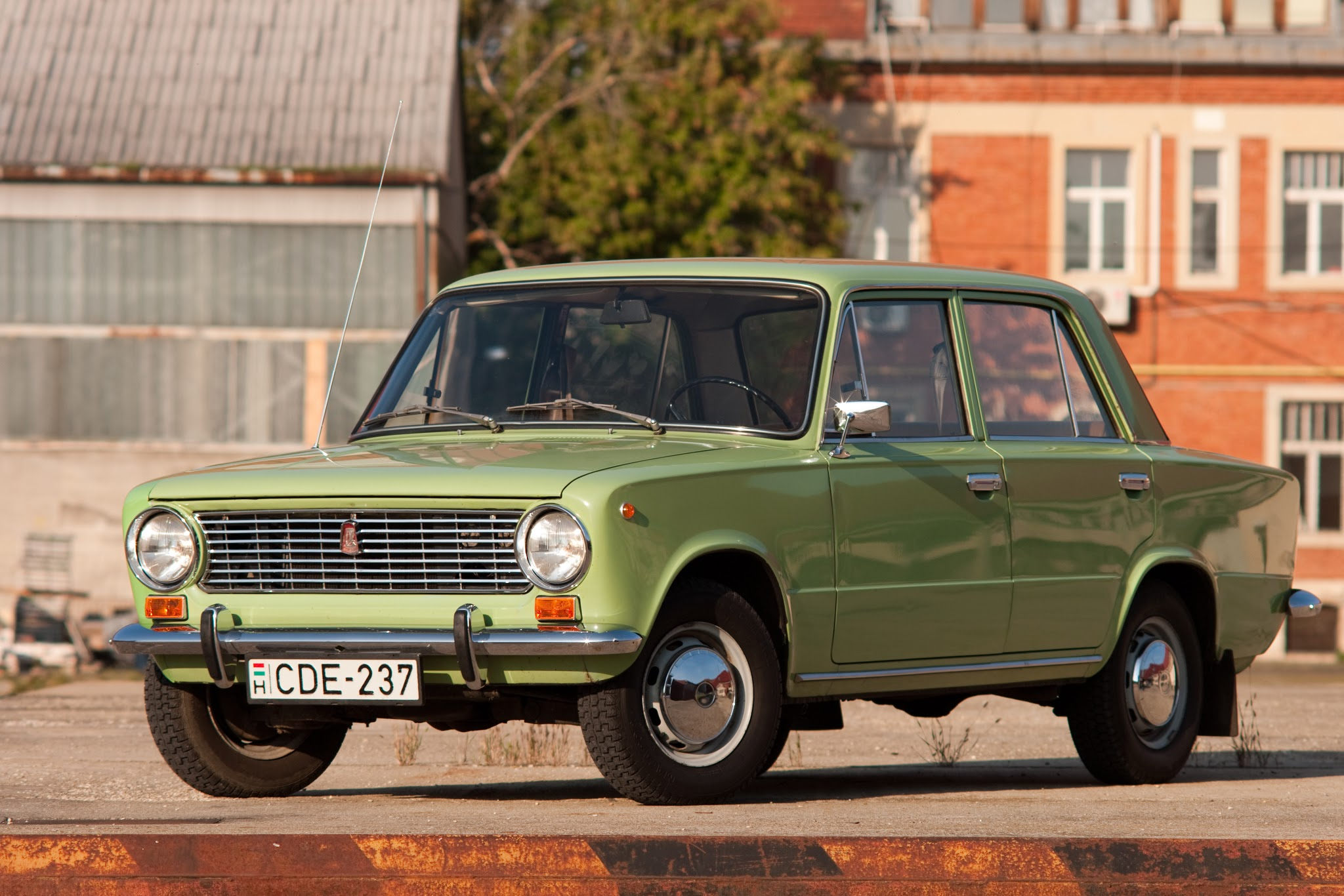
A Soviet-made ZAZ-968, manufactured between 1971 and 1994 (left) and a VAZ-2101/Lada 1200, manufactured between 1970 and 1988 (right)
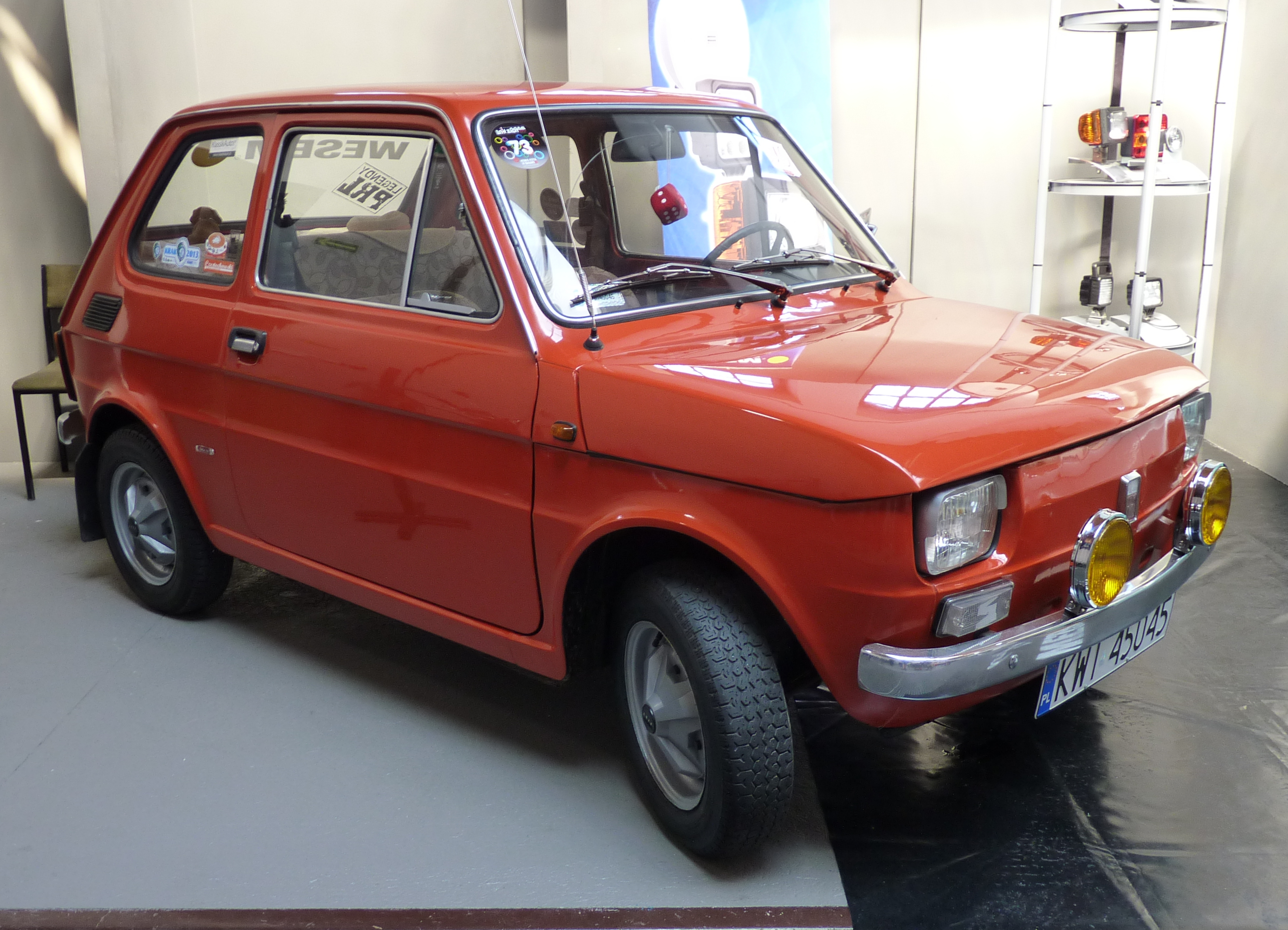
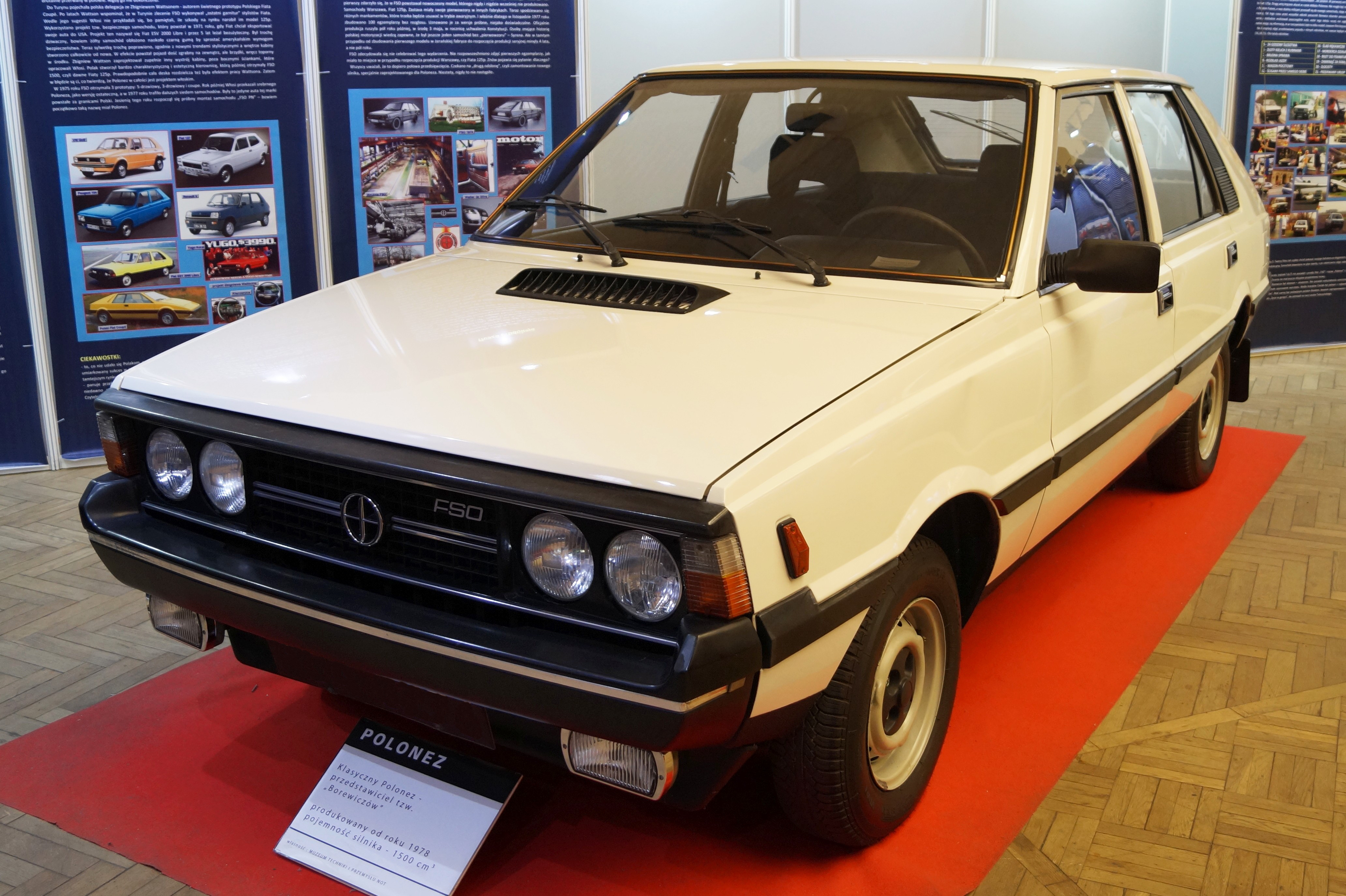
A Polish-made Polski Fiat 126p, manufactured between 1973 and 2000 (left) and an FSO Polonez 1500, manufactured between 1978 and 1991 (right)
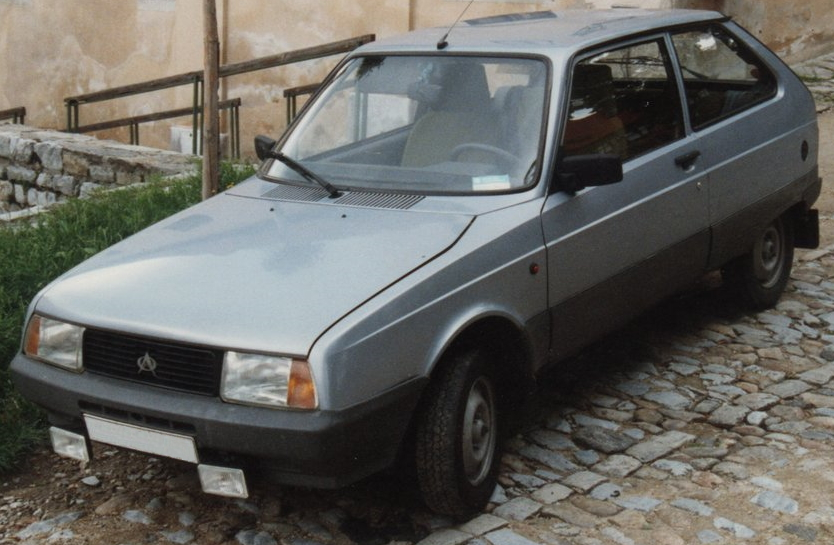
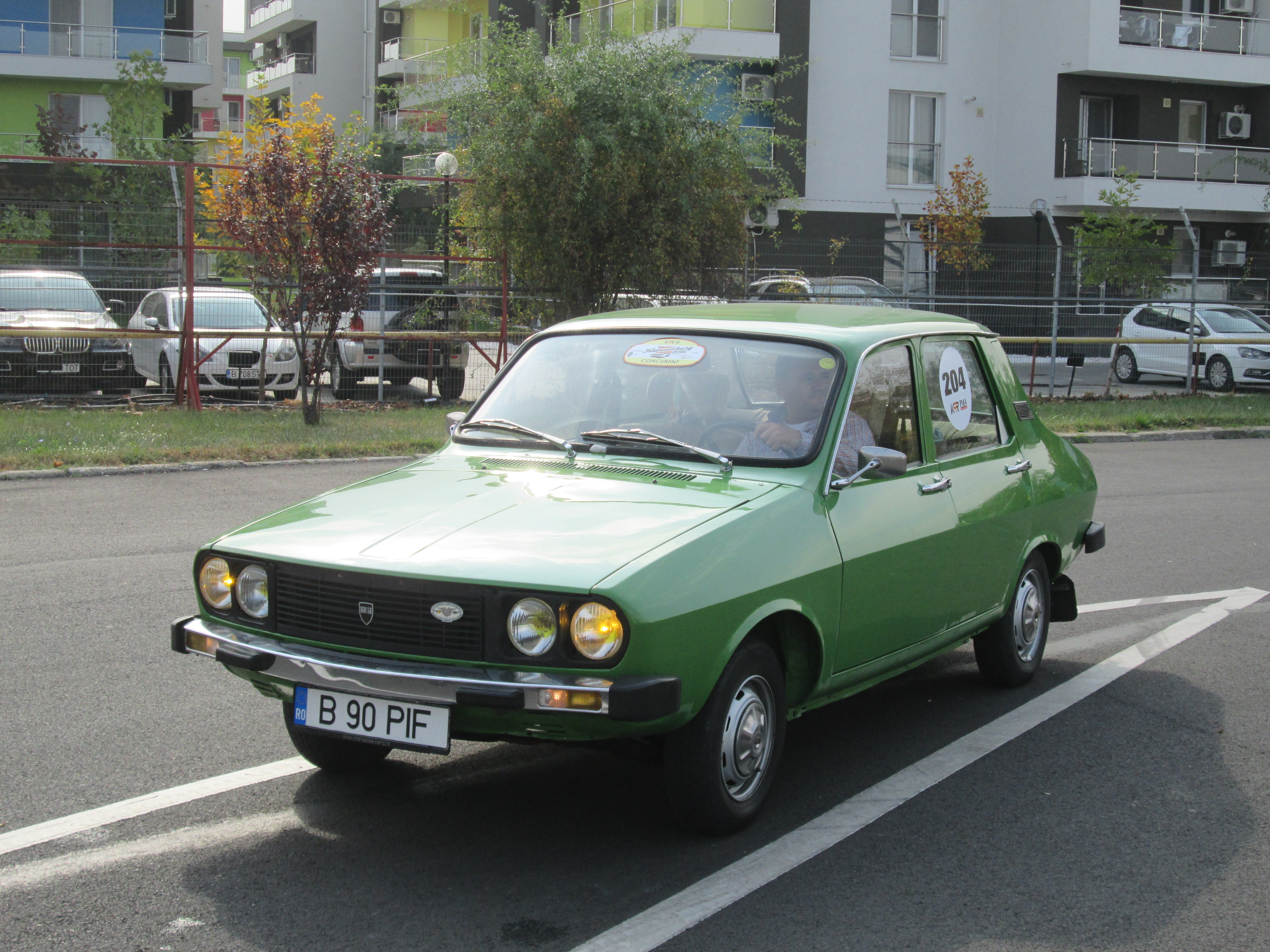
A Romanian-made Oltcit Club, manufactured between 1981 and 1995 (left); and a Dacia 1300, manufactured between 1969 and 2004 (right)
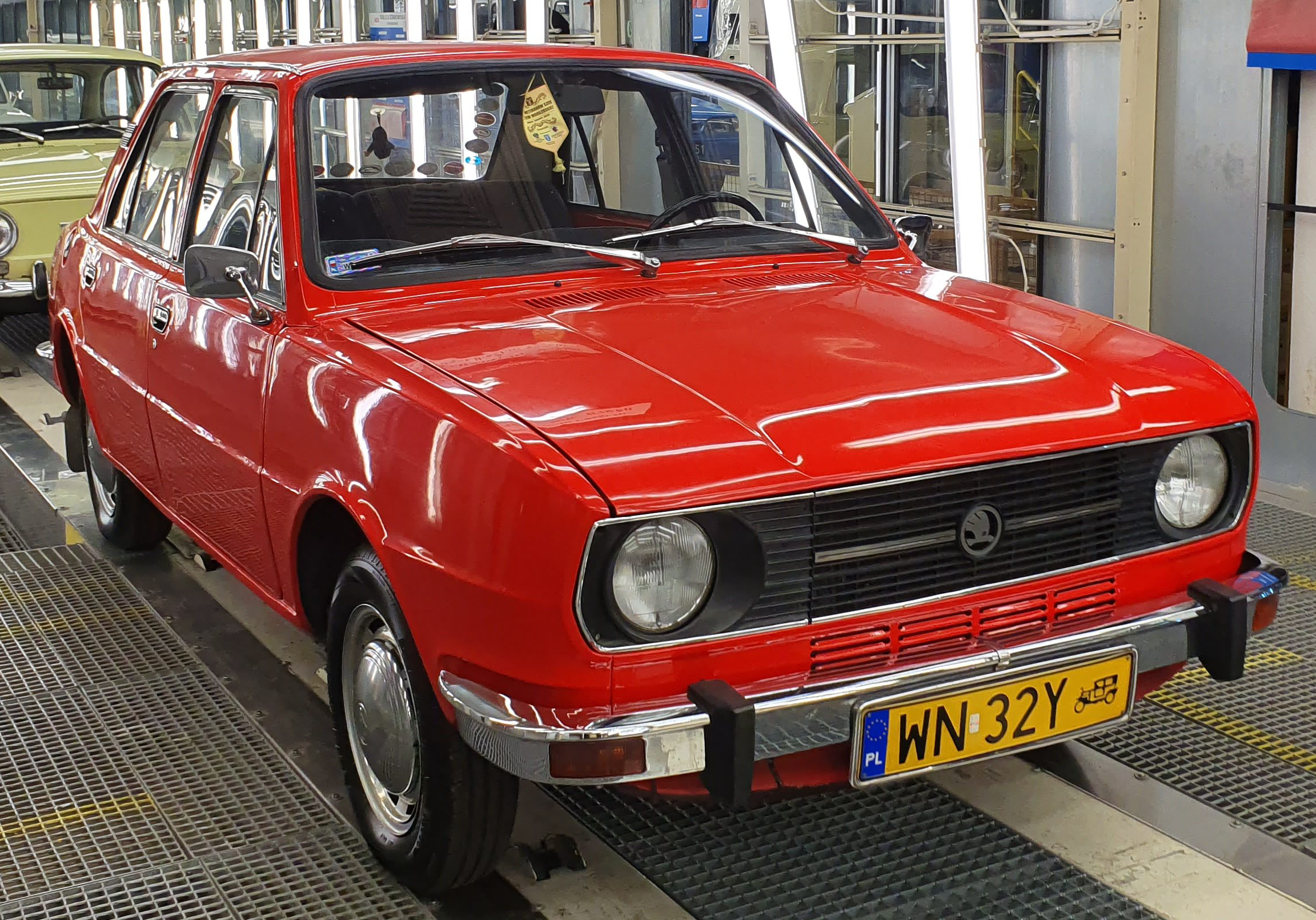
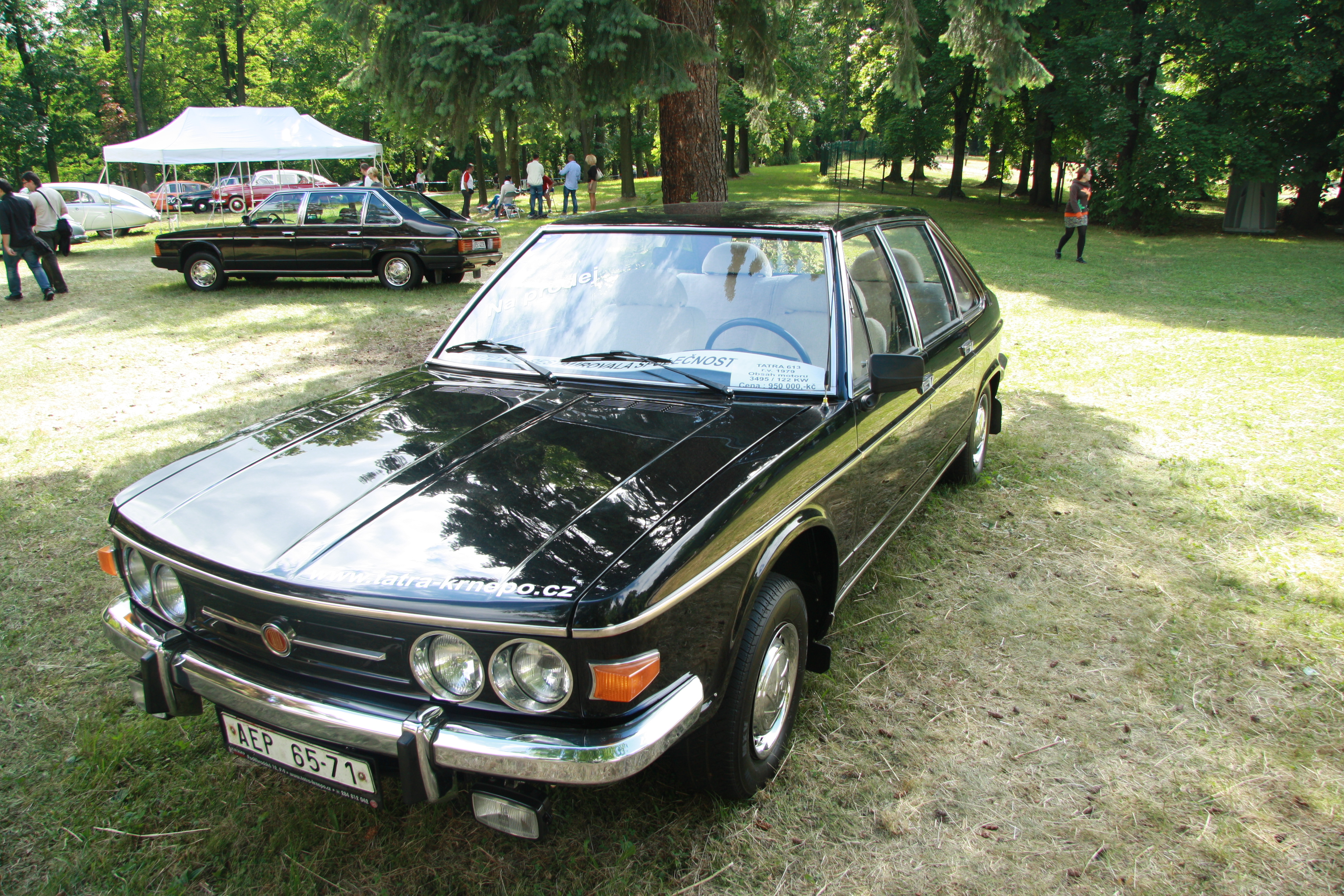
A Czechoslovak-made Škoda 105, manufactured between 1976 and 1990 (left); and a Tatra 613, manufactured between 1974 and 1996 (right)
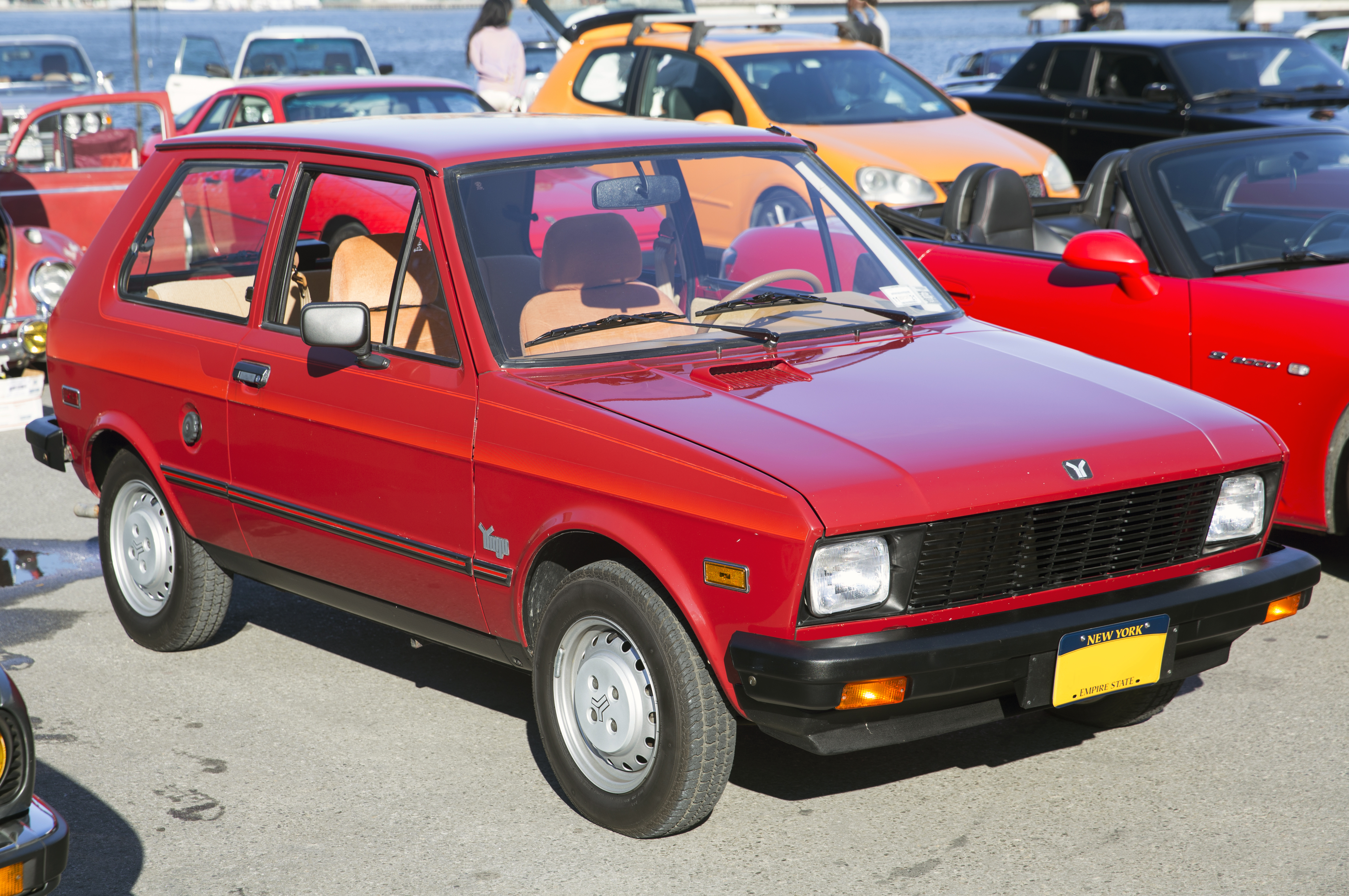
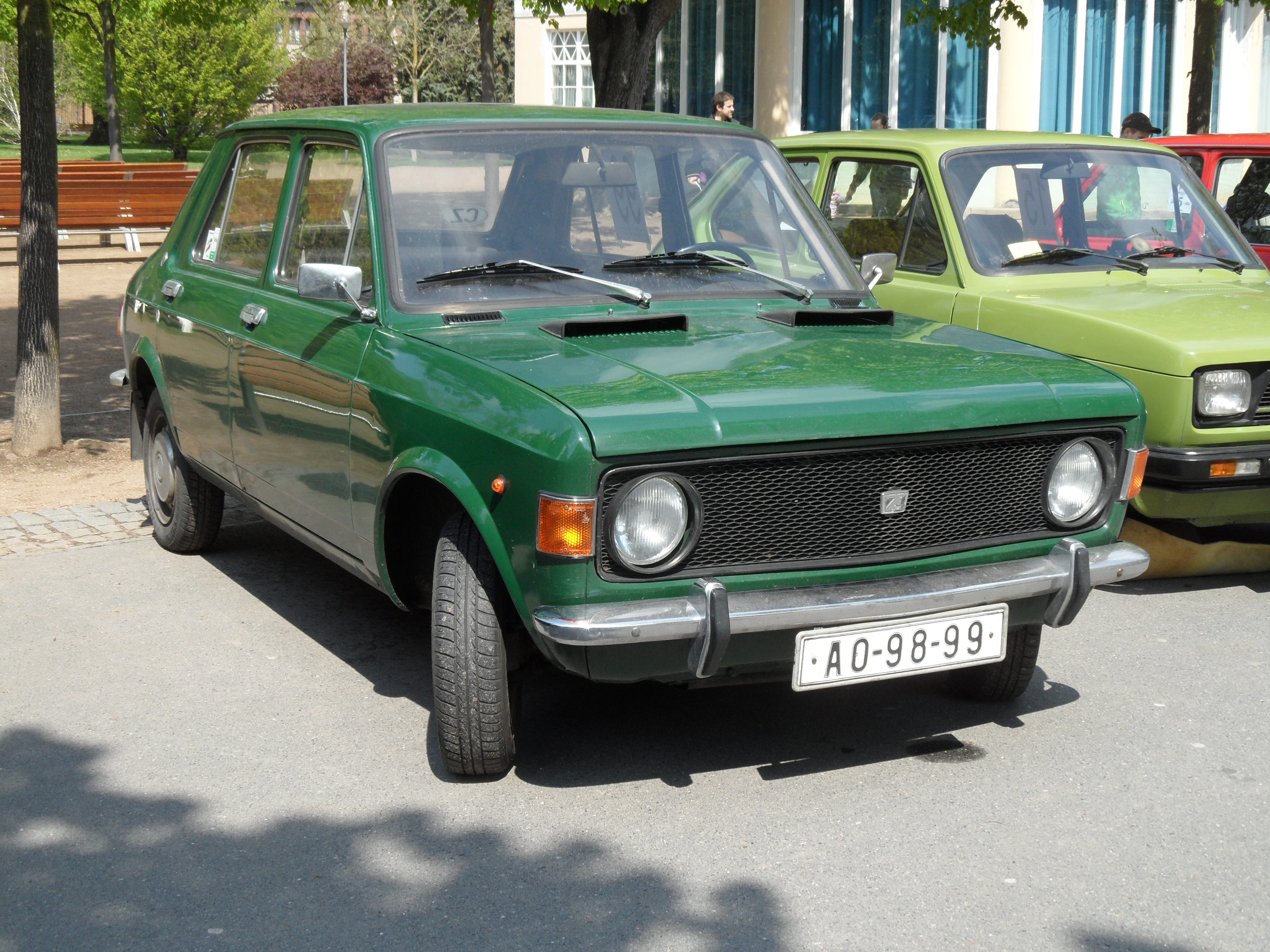
A Yugoslav-made Zastava/Yugo Koral, manufactured between 1980 and 2008 (left); and a Zastava 101, manufactured between 1971 and 2008 (right)

Vehicle ownership increased in the 1970s and 1980s with the production of inexpensive cars in East Germany such as Trabants and the Wartburgs. However, the wait list for the distribution of Trabants was ten years in 1987 and up to fifteen years for Soviet Lada and Czechoslovak Škoda cars. Soviet-built aircraft exhibited deficient technology, with high fuel consumption and heavy maintenance demands. Telecommunications networks were overloaded.

Adding to mobility constraints from the inadequate transport systems were bureaucratic mobility restrictions. While outside of Albania, domestic travel eventually became largely regulation-free, stringent controls on the issue of passports, visas and foreign currency made foreign travel difficult inside the Eastern Bloc. Countries were inured to isolation and initial post-war autarky, with each country effectively restricting bureaucrats to viewing issues from a domestic perspective shaped by that country's specific propaganda.

Severe environmental problems arose through urban traffic congestion, which was aggravated by pollution generated by poorly maintained vehicles. Large thermal power stations burning lignite and other items became notorious polluters, while some hydro-electric systems performed inefficiently because of dry seasons and silt accumulation in reservoirs. Kraków was covered by smog 135 days per year while Wrocław was covered by a fog of chrome gas.

Several villages were evacuated because of copper smelting at Głogów. Further rural problems arose from piped water construction being given precedence over building sewerage systems, leaving many houses with only inbound piped water delivery and not enough sewage tank trucks to carry away sewage. The resulting drinking water became so polluted in Hungary that over 700 villages had to be supplied by tanks, bottles and plastic bags. Nuclear power projects were prone to long commissioning delays.

The catastrophe at the Chernobyl nuclear plant in the Ukrainian SSR was caused by an irresponsible safety test on a reactor design that is normally safe, some operators lacking an even basic understanding of the reactor's processes and authoritarian Soviet bureaucracy, valuing party loyalty over competence, that kept promoting incompetent personnel and choosing cheapness over safety. The consequent release of fallout resulted in the evacuation and resettlement of over 336,000 people leaving a massive desolate Zone of alienation containing extensive still-standing abandoned urban development.

Tourism from outside the Eastern Bloc was neglected, while tourism from other socialist countries grew within the Eastern Bloc. Tourism drew investment, relying upon tourism and recreation opportunities existing before World War II. By 1945, most hotels were run-down, while many which escaped conversion to other uses by central planners were slated to meet domestic demands. Authorities created state companies to arrange travel and accommodation. In the 1970s, investments were made to attempt to attract western travelers, though momentum for this waned in the 1980s when no long-term plan arose to procure improvements in the tourist environment, such as an assurance of freedom of movement, free and efficient money exchange and the provision of higher quality products with which these tourists were familiar. However, Western tourists were generally free to move about in Hungary, Poland and Yugoslavia and go where they wished. It was more difficult or even impossible to go as an individual tourist to East Germany, Czechoslovakia, Romania, Bulgaria and Albania. It was generally possible in all cases for relatives from the west to visit and stay with family in the Eastern Bloc countries, except for Albania. In these cases, permission had to be sought, precise times, length of stay, location and movements had to be known in advance.

Citing concerns about ideological discipline and the influence of foreign lifestyles, the Albanian government segregated foreign tourists from the local population. Tourism was limited to roughly 6,000 visitors per year, strictly in state-managed group tours with restricted itineraries. Visitors were required to stay in state hotels, were banned from public transportation, and were subject to dress code enforcement, while citizens from the United States, Soviet Union, Israel, and South Africa were denied entry altogether.

==== Growth rates ====
Growth rates in the Eastern Bloc were initially high in the 1950s and 1960s. During this first period, progress was rapid by European standards and per capita growth within the Eastern Bloc increased by 2.4 times the European average. Eastern Europe accounted for 12.3 percent of European production in 1950 but 14.4 in 1970. However, the system was resistant to change and did not easily adapt to new conditions. For political reasons, old factories were rarely closed, even when new technologies became available. As a result, after the 1970s, growth rates within the bloc experienced relative decline. Meanwhile, West Germany, Austria, France and other Western European nations experienced increased economic growth in the Wirtschaftswunder ("economic miracle"), Trente Glorieuses ("thirty glorious years") and the post-World War II boom.

From the end of World War II to the mid-1970s, the economy of the Eastern Bloc steadily increased at the same rate as the economy in Western Europe, with the non-reformist nations of the Eastern Bloc having a stronger economy than the reformist states. While most western European economies essentially began to approach the per capita gross domestic product (GDP) levels of the United States during the late 1970s and early 1980s, the Eastern Bloc countries did not, with per capita GDPs trailing significantly behind their comparable western European counterparts.

The following table displays a set of estimated growth rates of GDP from 1951 onward, for the countries of the Eastern Bloc as well as those of Western Europe as reported by The Conference Board as part of its Total Economy Database. In some cases data availability does not go all the way back to 1951.

The Conference Board GDP growth rates in percent for the given years
Country	1951	1961	1971	1981	1989	1991	2001	2015
People's Socialist Republic of Albania	6.608	4.156	6.510	2.526	2.648	−28.000	7.940	2.600
People's Republic of Bulgaria	20.576	6.520	3.261	2.660	−1.792	−8.400	4.248	2.968
Hungarian People's Republic	9.659	5.056	4.462	0.706	−2.240	−11.900	3.849	2.951
Polish People's Republic	4.400	7.982	7.128	−5.324	−1.552	−7.000	1.248	3.650
Socialist Republic of Romania	7.237	6.761	14.114	−0.611	−3.192	−16.189	5.592	3.751
Czechoslovak Socialist Republic/Czech Republic	–	–	5.215	−0.160	1.706	−11.600	3.052	4.274
Czechoslovak Socialist Republic/Slovakia	–	–	–	–	1.010	−14.600	3.316	3.595
Soviet Union/Russia	–	7.200	4.200	1.200	0.704	−5.000	5.091	−3.727
Austria	6.840	5.309	5.112	−0.099	4.227	3.442	1.351	0.811
Belgium	5.688	4.865	3.753	−1.248	3.588	1.833	0.811	1.374
Denmark	0.668	6.339	2.666	−0.890	0.263	1.300	0.823	1.179
Finland	8.504	7.620	2.090	1.863	5.668	−5.914	2.581	0.546
France	6.160	5.556	4.839	1.026	4.057	1.039	1.954	1.270
Germany (West)	9.167	4.119	2.943	0.378	3.270	5.108	1.695	1.700
Greece	8.807	8.769	7.118	0.055	3.845	3.100	4.132	−0.321
Ireland	2.512	4.790	3.618	3.890	7.051	3.098	9.006	8.538
Italy	7.466	8.422	1.894	0.474	2.882	1.538	1.772	0.800
Netherlands	2.098	0.289	4.222	−0.507	4.679	2.439	2.124	1.990
Norway	5.418	6.268	5.130	0.966	0.956	3.085	2.085	1.598
Portugal	4.479	5.462	6.633	1.618	5.136	4.368	1.943	1.460
Spain	9.937	12.822	5.722	0.516	5.280	2.543	4.001	3.214
Sweden	3.926	5.623	2.356	−0.593	3.073	−1.146	1.563	3.830
Switzerland	8.097	8.095	4.076	1.579	4.340	−0.916	1.447	0.855
United Kingdom	2.985	3.297	2.118	−1.303	2.179	−1.257	2.758	2.329

The United Nations Statistics Division also calculates growth rates, using a different methodology, but only reports the figures starting in 1971 (for Slovakia and the constituent republics of the USSR data availability begins later). Thus, according to the United Nations growth rates in Europe were as follows:

United Nations Statistics Division GDP growth rates in percent for the given years
Country	1971	1981	1989	1991	2001	2015
People's Socialist Republic of Albania	4.001	5.746	9.841	−28.002	8.293	2.639
People's Republic of Bulgaria	6.897	4.900	−3.290	−8.445	4.248	2.968
Hungarian People's Republic	6.200	2.867	0.736	−11.687	3.774	3.148
Polish People's Republic	7.415	−9.971	0.160	−7.016	1.248	3.941
Socialist Republic of Romania	13.000	0.112	−5.788	−12.918	5.592	3.663
Czechoslovak Socialist Republic/Czech Republic	5.044	−0.095	0.386	−11.615	3.052	4.536
Czechoslovak Socialist Republic/Slovakia	–	–	–	−14.541	3.316	3.831
Soviet Union/Russia	5.209	5.301	6.801	−5.000	5.091	−3.727
Ukraine	–	–	–	−8.699	8.832	−9.870
Lithuania	–	–	–	−5.676	6.524	1.779
Yugoslavia/Serbia	9.162	1.400	1.500	−11.664	4.993	0.758
Austria	5.113	−0.144	3.887	3.442	1.351	0.963
Belgium	3.753	−0.279	3.469	1.833	0.812	1.500
Denmark	3.005	−0.666	0.645	1.394	0.823	1.606
Finland	2.357	1.295	5.088	−5.914	2.581	0.210
France	5.346	1.078	4.353	1.039	1.954	1.274
Germany (West)	3.133	0.529	3.897	5.108	1.695	1.721
Greece	7.841	−1.554	3.800	3.100	4.132	−0.219
Ireland	3.470	3.325	5.814	1.930	6.052	26.276
Italy	1.818	0.844	3.388	1.538	1.772	0.732
Netherlands	4.331	−0.784	4.420	2.439	2.124	1.952
Norway	5.672	1.598	1.038	3.085	2.085	1.611
Portugal	6.632	1.618	6.441	4.368	1.943	1.596
Spain	4.649	−0.132	4.827	2.546	4.001	3.205
Sweden	0.945	0.455	2.655	−1.146	1.563	4.085
Switzerland	4.075	1.601	4.331	−0.916	1.447	0.842
United Kingdom	3.479	−0.779	2.583	−1.119	2.726	2.222

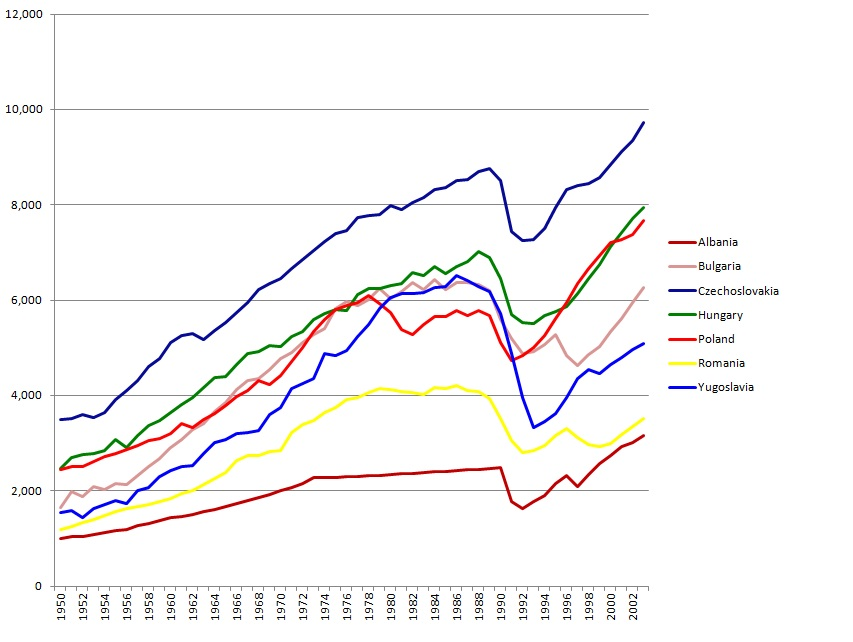
Per capita GDP in the Eastern Bloc from 1950 to 2003 (1990 base Geary-Khamis dollars) according to Angus Maddison

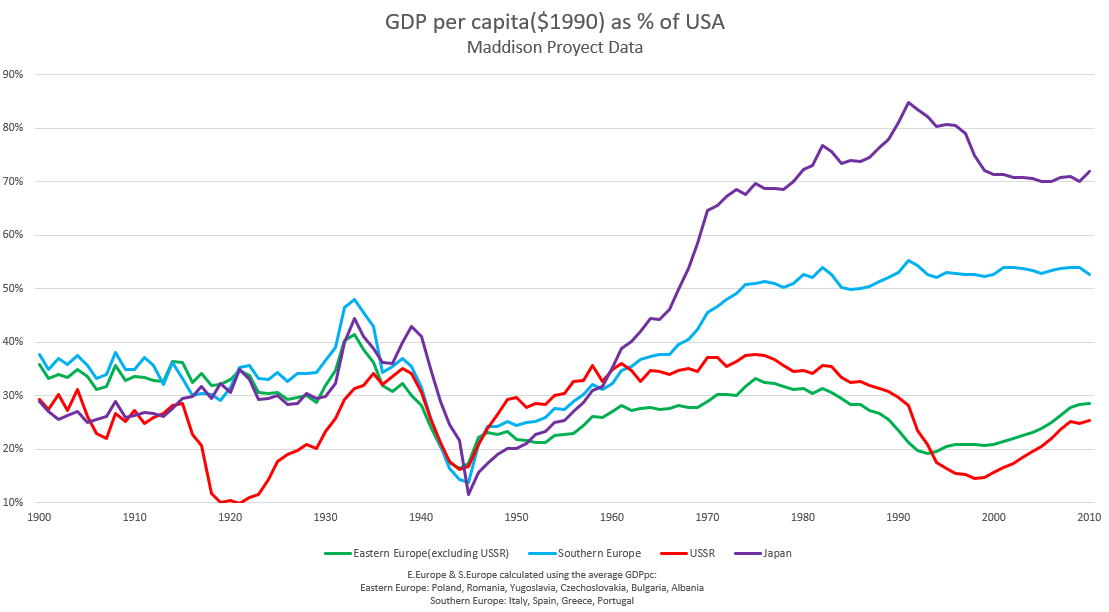
GDP per capita of the Eastern Bloc in relations with the GDP per capita of the United States during 1900–2010

The following table lists the level of nominal GDP per capita in certain selected countries, measured in US dollars, for the years 1970, 1989, and 2015:

Nominal GDP per Capita, according to the UN
Country	US dollars		
Country	1970	1989	2015
United Kingdom	2,350	16,275	44,162
Italy	2,112	16,239	30,462
Austria	2,042	17,313	44,118
Japan	2,040	25,054	34,629
Soviet Union/Russia	1,789	2,711	9,243
Ukraine	-	-	2,022
Lithuania	-	-	14,384
Greece	1,496	7,864	17,788
Ireland	1,493	11,029	60,514
Spain	1,205	10,577	25,865
Czechoslovak Socialist Republic/Czech Republic	1,136	3,764	17,562
Slovakia	-	-	16,082
People's Republic of Bulgaria	1,059	2,477	6,847
People's Socialist Republic of Albania	1,053	904	3,984
Cyprus	1,004	9,015	21,942
Polish People's Republic	1,000	2,229	12,355
Portugal	935	6,129	19,239
Yugoslavia/Serbia	721	4,197	5,239
Cuba	653	2,577	7,657
Socialist Republic of Romania	619	2,424	9,121
Hungarian People's Republic	615	3,115	12,351
China	111	406	8,109
Vietnam	64	94	2,068

While it can be argued the World Bank estimates of GDP used for 1990 figures underestimate Eastern Bloc GDP because of undervalued local currencies, per capita incomes were undoubtedly lower than in their counterparts. East Germany was the most advanced industrial nation of the Eastern Bloc. Until the building of the Berlin Wall in 1961, East Germany was considered a weak state, hemorrhaging skilled labor to the West such that it was referred to as "the disappearing satellite". Only after the wall sealed in skilled labor was East Germany able to ascend to the top economic spot in the Eastern Bloc. Thereafter, its citizens enjoyed a higher quality of life and fewer shortages in the supply of goods than those in the Soviet Union, Poland or Romania.

While official statistics painted a relatively rosy picture, the East German economy had eroded because of increased central planning, economic autarky, the use of coal over oil, investment concentration in a few selected technology-intensive areas and labor market regulation. As a result, a large productivity gap of nearly 50% per worker existed between East and West Germany. However, that gap does not measure the quality of design of goods or service such that the actual per capita rate may be as low as 14 to 20 per cent. Average gross monthly wages in East Germany were around 30% of those in West Germany, though after accounting for taxation the figures approached 60%.

Moreover, the purchasing power of wages differed greatly, with only about half of East German households owning either a car or a color television set as late as 1990, both of which had been standard possessions in West German households. The Ostmark was only valid for transactions inside East Germany, could not be legally exported or imported and could not be used in the East German Intershops which sold premium goods. In 1989, 11% of the East German labor force remained in agriculture, 47% was in the secondary sector and 42% in services.

Once installed, the economic system was difficult to change given the importance of politically reliable management and the prestige value placed on large enterprises. Performance declined during the 1970s and 1980s due to inefficiency when industrial input costs, such as energy prices, increased. Though growth lagged behind the West, it did occur. Consumer goods started to become more available by the 1960s.

Before the Eastern Bloc's dissolution, some major sectors of industry were operating at such a loss that they exported products to the West at prices below the real value of the raw materials. Hungarian steel costs doubled those of western Europe. In 1985, a quarter of Hungary's state budget was spent on supporting inefficient enterprises. Tight planning in Bulgaria's industry meant continuing shortages in other parts of its economy.

=== Development policies ===
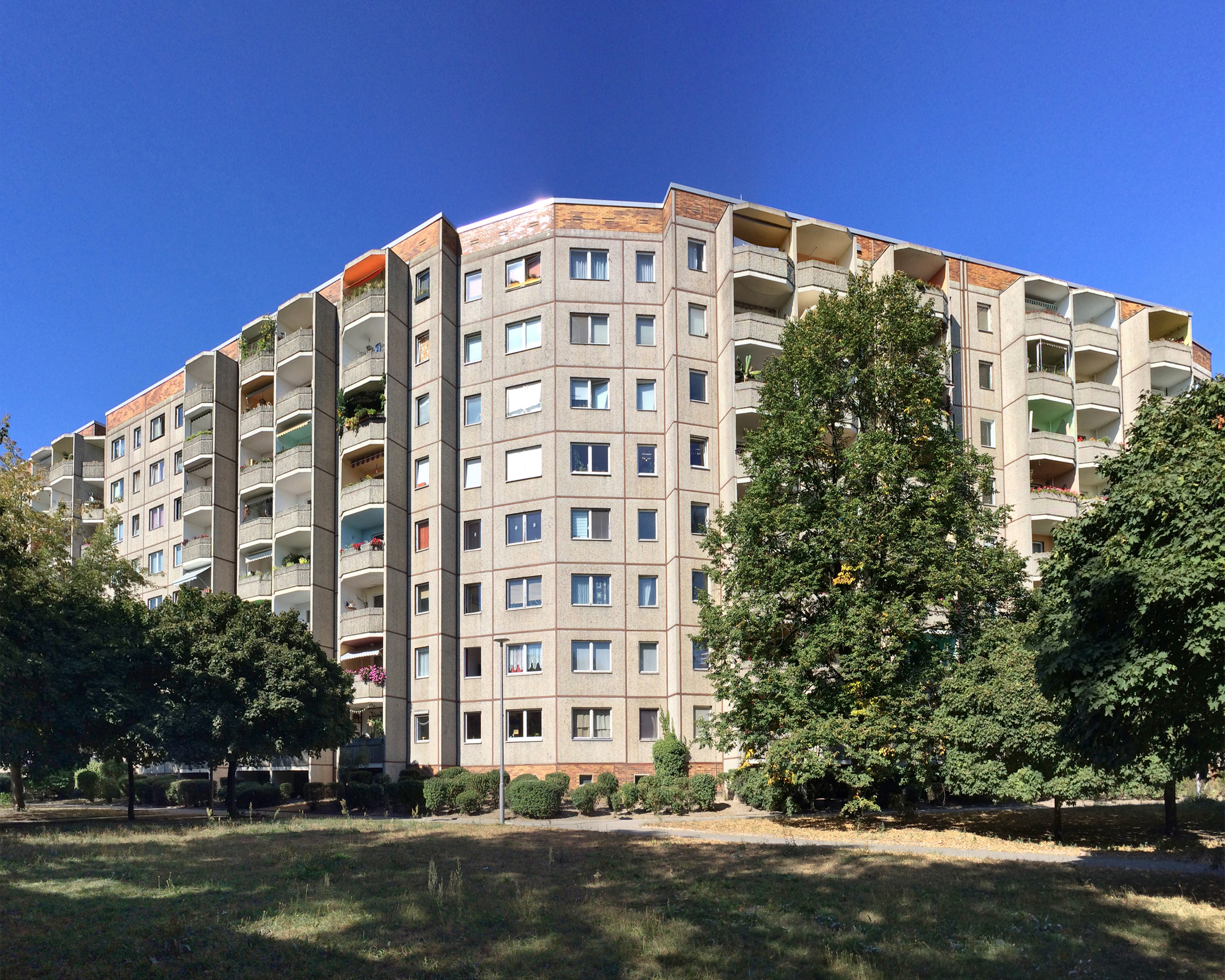
East German Plattenbau apartment blocks

In social terms, the 18 years (1964–1982) of Brezhnev's leadership saw real incomes grow more than 1.5 times. More than 1.6 billion square metres of living space were commissioned and provided to over 160 million people. At the same time, the average rent for families did not exceed 3% of the family income. There was unprecedented affordability of housing, health care and education.

In a survey by the Sociological Research Institute of the USSR Academy of Sciences in 1986, 75% of those surveyed said that they were better off than the previous ten years. Over 95% of Soviet adults considered themselves "fairly well off". 55% of those surveyed felt that medical services improved, 46% believed public transportation had improved and 48% said that the standard of services provided public service establishments had risen.

During the years 1957–1965, housing policy underwent several institutional changes with industrialisation and urbanisation had not been matched by an increase in housing after World War II. Housing shortages in the Soviet Union were worse than in the rest of the Eastern Bloc due to a larger migration to the towns and more wartime devastation and were worsened by Stalin's pre-war refusals to invest properly in housing. Because such investment was generally not enough to sustain the existing population, apartments had to be subdivided into increasingly smaller units, resulting in several families sharing an apartment previously meant for one family.

The prewar norm became one Soviet family per room, with the toilets and kitchen shared. The amount of living space in urban areas fell from 5.7 square metres per person in 1926 to 4.5 square metres in 1940. In the rest of the Eastern Bloc during this time period, the average number of people per room was 1.8 in Bulgaria (1956), 2.0 in Czechoslovakia (1961), 1.5 in Hungary (1963), 1.7 in Poland (1960), 1.4 in Romania (1966), 2.4 in Yugoslavia (1961) and 0.9 in 1961 in East Germany.

After Stalin's death in 1953, forms of an economic "New Course" brought a revival of private house construction. Private construction peaked in 1957–1960 in many Eastern Bloc countries and then declined simultaneously along with a steep increase in state and co-operative housing. By 1960, the rate of housebuilding per head had picked up in all countries in the Eastern Bloc. Between 1950 and 1975, worsening shortages were generally caused by a fall in the proportion of all investment made housing. However, during that period the total number of dwellings increased.

During the last fifteen years of this period (1960–1975), an emphasis was made for a supply side solution, which assumed that industrialised building methods and high rise housing would be cheaper and quicker than traditional brick-built, low-rise housing. Such methods required manufacturing organisations to produce the prefabricated components and organisations to assemble them on site, both of which planners assumed would employ large numbers of unskilled workers-with powerful political contacts. The lack of participation of eventual customers, the residents, constituted one factor in escalating construction costs and poor quality work. This led to higher demolition rates and higher costs to repair poorly constructed dwellings. In addition, because of poor quality work, a black market arose for building services and materials that could not be procured from state monopolies.

In most countries, completions (new dwellings constructed) rose to a high point between 1975 and 1980 and then fell as a result presumably of worsening international economic conditions. This occurred in Bulgaria, Hungary, East Germany, Poland, Romania (with an earlier peak in 1960 also), Czechoslovakia and Yugoslavia while the Soviet Union peaked in 1960 and 1970. While between 1975 and 1986, the proportion of investment devoted to housing actually rose in most of the Eastern Bloc, general economic conditions resulted in total investment amounts falling or becoming stagnant.

The employment of socialist ideology in housing policy declined in the 1980s, which accompanied a shift in authorities looking at the need of residents to an examination of potential residents' ability to pay. Yugoslavia was unique in that it continuously mixed private and state sources of housing finance, stressed self-managed building co-operatives along with central government controls.

=== Shortages ===
The initial year that shortages were effectively measured and shortages in 1986 were as follows:

Housing shortages in the Eastern Bloc and Yugoslavia
Country	Initial year	Initial year shortage	% of total stock	1986 shortage	1986 % of total stock
Albania	n/a	n/a	n/a	n/a	n/a
Bulgaria	1965	472,000	23.0	880,400	27.4
Hungary	1973	6,000	0.2	257,000	6.6
East Germany	1971	340,000	5.6	1,181,700	17.1
Poland	1974	1,357,000	15.9	2,574,800	23.9
Romania	1966	575,000	11.0	1,157,900	14.0
Soviet Union	1970	13,690,000	23.1	26,662,400	30.2
Czechoslovakia	1970	438,000	9.9	877,600	15.3
Yugoslavia	n/a	n/a	n/a	1,634,700	23.9

These are official housing figures and may be low. For example, in the Soviet Union the figure of 26,662,400 in 1986 almost certainly underestimates shortages for the reason that it does not count shortages from large Soviet rural-urban migration; another calculation estimates shortages to be 59,917,900. By the late 1980s, Poland had an average 20-year wait time for housing while Warsaw had between a 26- and 50-year wait time. In the Soviet Union, widespread illegal subletting occurred at exorbitant rates. Toward the end of the Eastern Bloc allegations of misallocations and illegal distribution of housing were raised in Soviet CPSU Central Committee meetings.

In Poland, housing problems were caused by slow rates of construction, poor home quality (which was even more pronounced in villages) and a large black market. In Romania, social engineering policy and concern about the use of agricultural land forced high densities and high-rise housing designs. In Bulgaria, a prior emphasis on monolithic high-rise housing lessened somewhat in the 1970s and 1980s. In the Soviet Union, housing was perhaps the primary social problem. While Soviet housing construction rates were high, quality was poor and demolition rates were high, in part because of an inefficient building industry and lack of both quality and quantity of construction materials.

East German housing suffered from a lack of quality and a lack of skilled labor, with a shortage of materials, plot and permits. In Albania, housing blocks (panelka) were spartan, with six-story walk-ups being the most frequent design. Housing was allocated by workplace trade unions and built by voluntary labor organised into brigades within the workplace. Yugoslavia suffered from fast urbanisation, uncoordinated development and poor organisation resulting from a lack of hierarchical structure and clear accountability, low building productivity, the monopoly position of building enterprises and irrational credit policies.

== Revolts ==
=== 1953 East Germany uprising ===
Three months after the death of Joseph Stalin, a dramatic increase of emigration (Republikflucht, brain drain) occurred from East Germany in the first half-year of 1953. Large numbers of East Germans traveled west through the only "loophole" left in the Eastern Bloc emigration restrictions, the Berlin sector border. The East German government then raised "norms" – the amount each worker was required to produce – by 10%. Already disaffected East Germans, who could see the relative economic successes of West Germany within Berlin, became enraged. Angry building workers initiated street protests, and were soon joined by others in a march to the Berlin trade union headquarters.

While no official spoke to them at that location, by 2:00 pm, the East German government agreed to withdraw the "norm" increases. However, the crisis had already escalated such that the demands were now political, including free elections, disbanding the army and resignation of the government. By 17 June, strikes were recorded in 317 locations involving approximately 400,000 workers. When strikers set ruling SED party buildings aflame and tore the flag from the Brandenburg Gate, SED General Secretary Walter Ulbricht left Berlin.

A major emergency was declared and the Soviet Red Army stormed some important buildings. Within hours, Soviet tanks arrived, but they did not immediately fire upon all workers. Rather, a gradual pressure was applied. Approximately 16 Soviet divisions with 20,000 soldiers from the Group of Soviet Forces in Germany using tanks, as well as 8,000 Kasernierte Volkspolizei members, were employed. Bloodshed could not be entirely avoided, with the official death toll standing at 21, while the actual casualty toll may have been much higher. Thereafter, 20,000 arrests took place along with 40 executions.

=== Hungarian Revolution of 1956 ===
After Stalin's death in 1953, a period of de-Stalinization followed, with reformist Imre Nagy replacing communist leader Mátyás Rákosi. Responding to popular demand, in October 1956, the Polish government appointed the recently rehabilitated reformist Władysław Gomułka as First Secretary of the Polish United Workers' Party, with a mandate to negotiate trade concessions and troop reductions with the Soviet government. After a few tense days of negotiations, on 19 October, the Soviets finally gave in to Gomułka's reformist requests.

The revolution began after students of the Technical University compiled a list of Demands of Hungarian Revolutionaries of 1956 and conducted protests in support of the demands on 22 October. Protests of support swelled to 200,000 by 6 pm the following day, The demands included free secret ballot elections, independent tribunals, inquiries into Stalin and Rákosi Hungarian activities and that "the statue of Stalin, symbol of Stalinist tyranny and political oppression, be removed as quickly as possible." By 9:30 pm the statue was toppled and jubilant crowds celebrated by placing Hungarian flags in Stalin's boots, which was all that remained the statue. The ÁVH was called, Hungarian soldiers sided with the crowd over the ÁVH and shots were fired on the crowd.

By 2 am on 24 October, under orders of Soviet defense minister Georgy Zhukov, Soviet tanks entered Budapest. Protester attacks at the Parliament forced the dissolution of the government. A ceasefire was arranged on 28 October, and by 30 October most Soviet troops had withdrawn from Budapest to garrisons in the Hungarian countryside. Fighting had virtually ceased between 28 October and 4 November, while many Hungarians believed that Soviet military units were indeed withdrawing from Hungary.

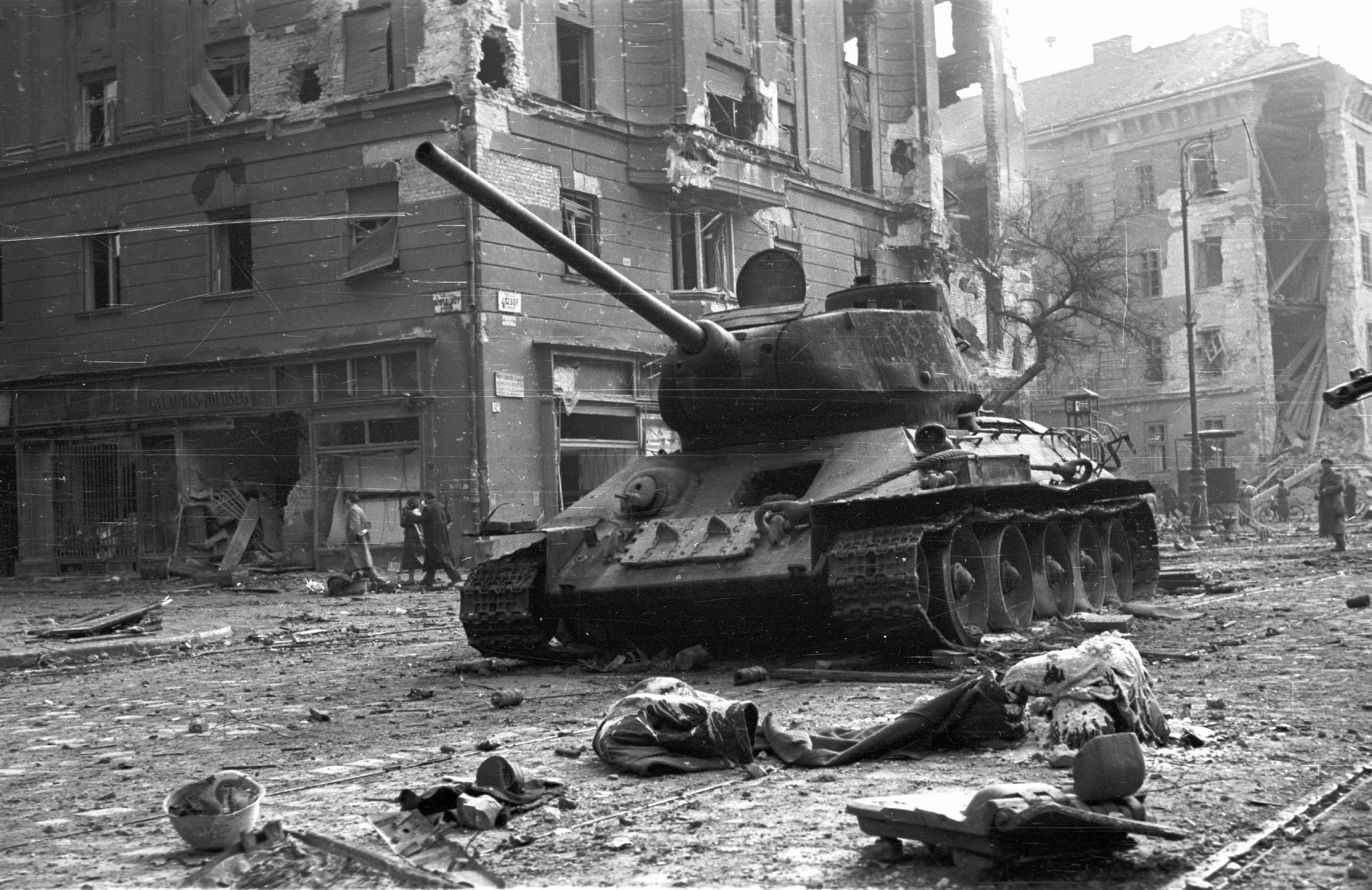
Budapest in 1956

The new government that came to power during the revolution formally disbanded ÁVH, declared its intention to withdraw from the Warsaw Pact and pledged to re-establish free elections. The Soviet Politburo thereafter moved to crush the revolution. On 4 November, a large Soviet force invaded Budapest and other regions of the country. The last pocket of resistance called for ceasefire on 10 November. Over 2,500 Hungarians and 722 Soviet troops were killed and thousands more were wounded.

Thousands of Hungarians were arrested, imprisoned and deported to the Soviet Union, many without evidence. Approximately 200,000 Hungarians fled Hungary, some 26,000 Hungarians were put on trial by the new Soviet-installed János Kádár government, and of those, 13,000 were imprisoned. Imre Nagy was executed, along with Pál Maléter and Miklós Gimes, after secret trials in June 1958. Their bodies were placed in unmarked graves in the Municipal Cemetery outside Budapest. By January 1957, the new Soviet-installed government had suppressed all public opposition.

=== Prague Spring and the 1968 invasion of Czechoslovakia ===
A period of political liberalization in Czechoslovakia called the Prague Spring took place in 1968. The event was spurred by several events, including economic reforms that addressed an early 1960s economic downturn. The event began on 5 January 1968, when reformist Slovak Alexander Dubček came to power. In April, Dubček launched an "Action Program" of liberalizations, which included increasing freedom of the press, freedom of speech and freedom of movement, along with an economic emphasis on consumer goods, the possibility of a multiparty government and limiting the power of the secret police.

Initial reaction within the Eastern Bloc was mixed, with Hungary's János Kádár expressing support, while Soviet leader Leonid Brezhnev and others grew concerned about Dubček's reforms, which they feared might weaken the Eastern Bloc's position during the Cold War. On 3 August, representatives from the Soviet Union, East Germany, Poland, Hungary, Bulgaria, and Czechoslovakia met in Bratislava and signed the Bratislava Declaration, which affirmed unshakable fidelity to Marxism–Leninism and proletarian internationalism and declared an implacable struggle against "bourgeois" ideology and all "anti-socialist" forces.

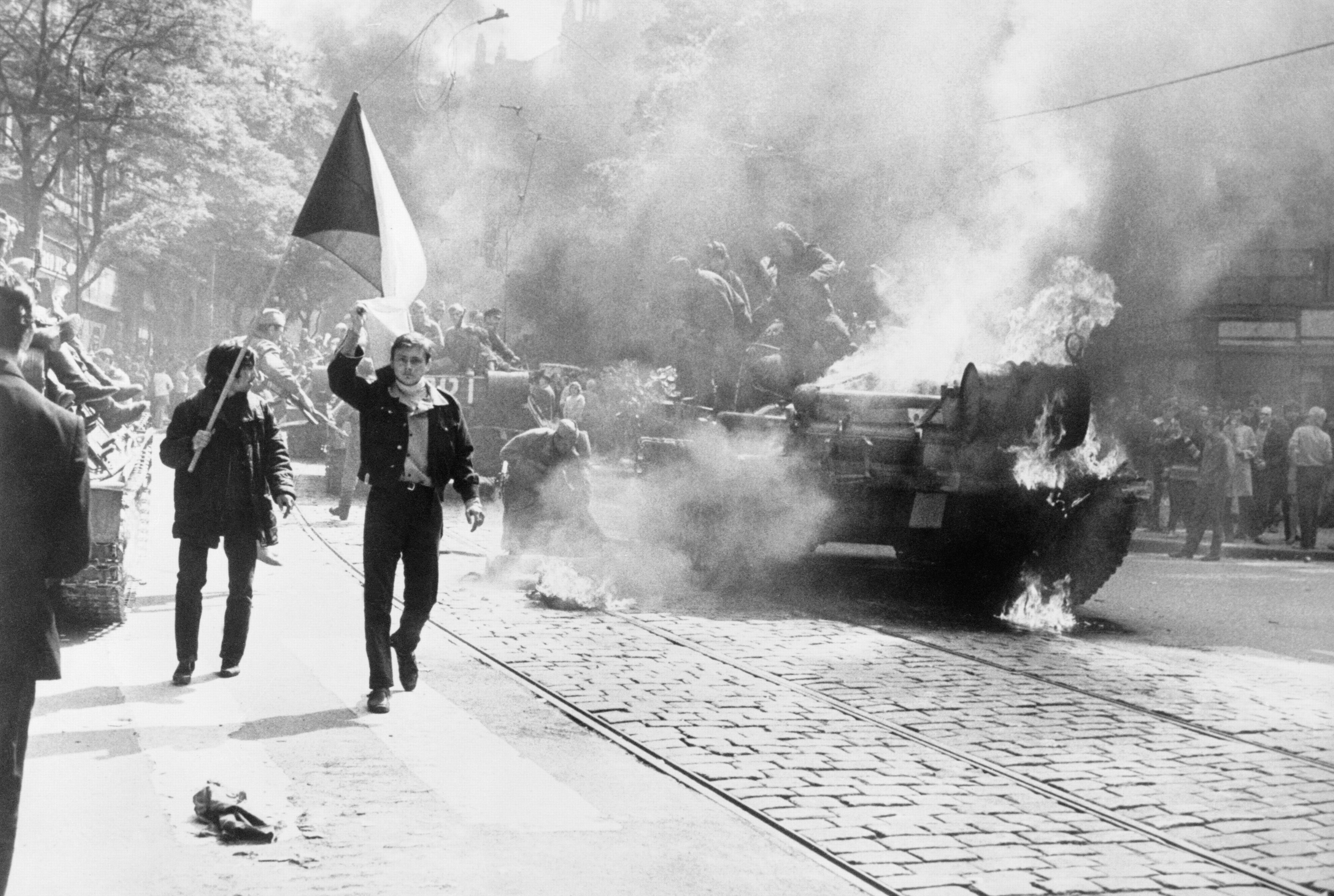
Czechoslovak protestors carrying their national flag past a burning Soviet tank in Prague, 1968

On the night of 20–21 August 1968, Eastern Bloc armies from five Warsaw Pact countries (the Soviet Union, Poland, East Germany, Hungary and Bulgaria) invaded Czechoslovakia. The invasion comported with the Brezhnev Doctrine, a policy of compelling Eastern Bloc states to subordinate national interests to those of the Bloc as a whole and the exercise of a Soviet right to intervene if an Eastern Bloc country appeared to shift towards capitalism. The invasion was followed by a wave of emigration, including an estimated 70,000 Czechoslovaks initially fleeing, with the total eventually reaching 300,000.

In April 1969, Dubček was replaced as first secretary by Gustáv Husák and a period of "normalization" began. Husák reversed Dubček's reforms, purged the party of liberal members, dismissed opponents from public office, reinstated the power of the police authorities, sought to re-centralize the economy and re-instated the disallowance of political commentary in mainstream media and by persons not considered to have "full political trust".

== Dissolution ==
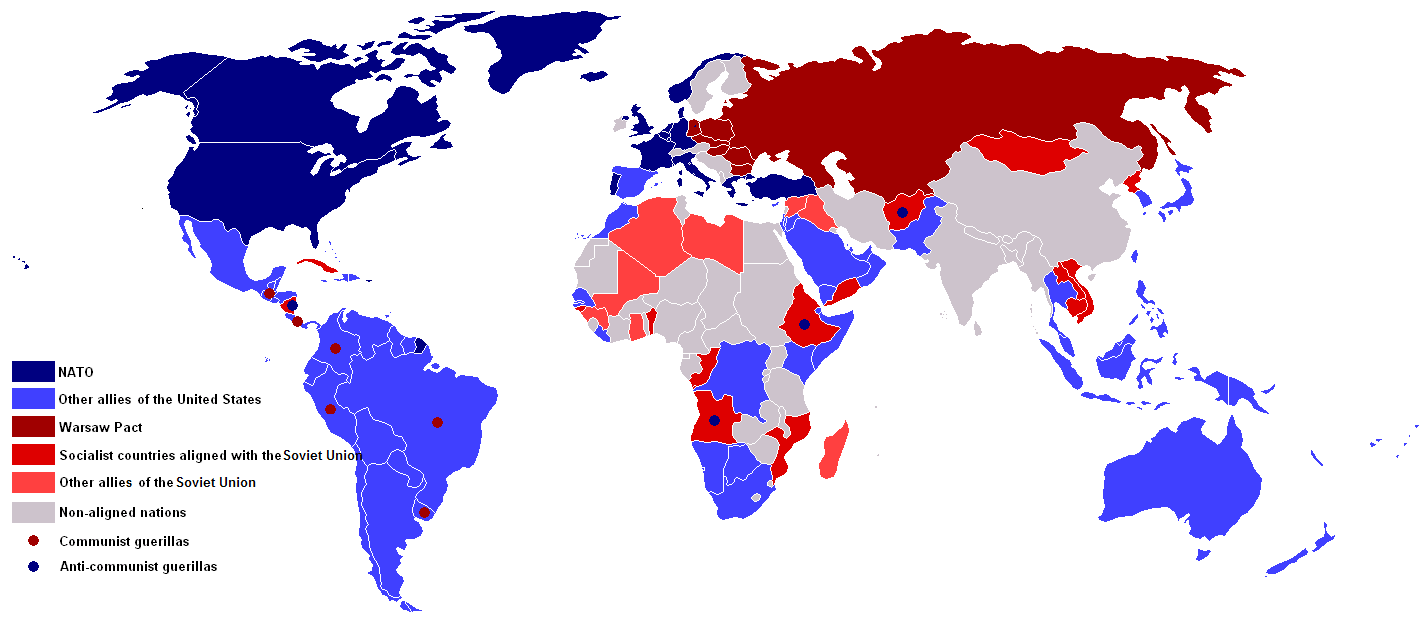
The Cold War in 1980 before the Iran–Iraq War

Soviet control of the Eastern Bloc was first tested by the 1948 Czechoslovak coup d'état and the Tito–Stalin split over the direction of the People's Federal Republic of Yugoslavia, the Chinese Communist Revolution (1949) and Chinese participation in the Korean War. After Stalin's death in 1953, the Korean War ceased with the 1954 Geneva Conference. In Europe, anti-Soviet sentiment provoked the East German uprising of 1953. Nikita Khrushchev's 1956 anti-Stalin speech On the Cult of Personality and Its Consequences was a factor in the Hungarian Revolution of 1956, which the Soviet Union suppressed, and the Sino–Soviet split. The Sino–Soviet split gave North Korea and North Vietnam more independence from both and facilitated the Albanian–Soviet split. The Cuban Missile Crisis and the failure of the Bay of Pigs Invasion preserved the Cuban Revolution from rollback by the United States but Cuban leader Fidel Castro became increasingly independent of Soviet influence afterwards, most notably during the 1975 Cuban intervention in Angola. In 1975, the communist victory in former French Indochina following the end of the Vietnam War gave the Eastern Bloc renewed confidence after it had been frayed by Soviet leader Leonid Brezhnev's 1968 invasion of Czechoslovakia to suppress the Prague Spring. This led to the People's Republic of Albania withdrawing from the Warsaw Pact, briefly aligning with Mao Zedong's China until the Sino-Albanian split.

Under the Brezhnev Doctrine, the Soviet Union reserved the right to intervene in other socialist states. In response, China moved towards the United States following the Sino-Soviet border conflict and later started the reform and opening up while the Eastern Bloc saw the Era of Stagnation in comparison with the capitalist First World. The Soviet–Afghan War (24 December 1979 – 15 February 1989) nominally expanded the Eastern Bloc, but the war proved unwinnable and too costly for the Soviets, challenged in Eastern Europe by the civil resistance of Solidarity. In the late 1980s, Soviet leader Mikhail Gorbachev pursued policies of glasnost (openness) and perestroika (restructuring) to reform the Eastern Bloc and end the Cold War, which brought forth unrest throughout the bloc.

During the mid-to-late 1980s, the weakened Soviet Union gradually stopped interfering in the internal affairs of Eastern Bloc nations and numerous independence movements took place.

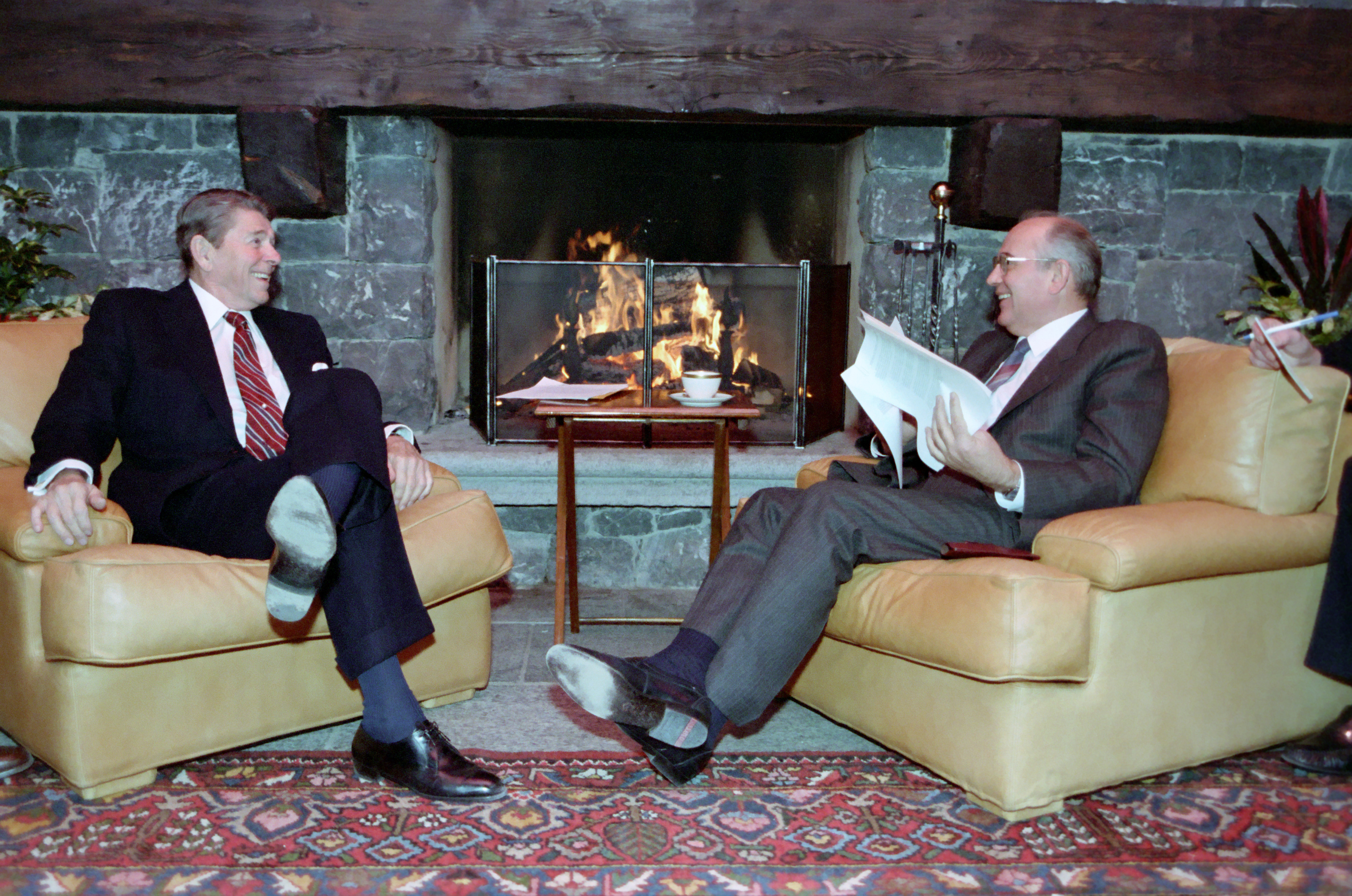
Soviet General Secretary Mikhail Gorbachev, who sought to end the Cold War between the Soviet-led Warsaw Pact and the United States-led NATO and its other Western allies, in a meeting with President Ronald Reagan

Following the Brezhnev stagnation, the reform-minded Soviet leader Mikhail Gorbachev in 1985 signaled the trend towards greater liberalization. Gorbachev rejected the Brezhnev Doctrine, which held that Moscow would intervene if socialism were threatened in any state. He announced what was jokingly called the "Sinatra Doctrine" after the singer's "My Way" to allow the countries of Central and Eastern Europe to determine their own internal affairs during this period.

Gorbachev initiated a policy of glasnost (openness) in the Soviet Union, and emphasized the need for perestroika (economic restructuring). The Soviet Union was struggling economically after the long war in Afghanistan and did not have the resources to control Central and Eastern Europe.

The start of the disintegration of the Eastern Bloc can be attributed to June 1989 Polish parliamentary election, to the opening of a border gate between Austria and Hungary at the Pan-European Picnic on 19 August 1989, and to the fact that the Hungarian Government granted 108 GDR citizens permission to cross the Iron Curtain. These citizens had stayed in the Embassy of Western Germany in Budapest. This permission became publicly known. Nine days later, 1,400 had come to the Embassy, on 2 September there were 3,500 and on 4 September 4,700 GDR citizens. At the evening of 9 September 1989, Hungary opened its border to Austria for all GDR citizens.

On 3 October 1990 East Germany reunited with West Germany following the November 1989 fall of the Berlin Wall. Unlike previous Soviet leaders in 1953, 1956 and 1968, Gorbachev refused to use force to end the 1989 Revolutions against Marxist–Leninist rule in Eastern Europe. The fall of the Berlin Wall and end of the Warsaw Pact spread nationalist and liberal ideals throughout the Soviet Union. In 1991, Conservative communist elites launched a 1991 Soviet coup d'état attempt, which hastened the end of Marxist–Leninist rule in Eastern Europe. However, the 1989 Tiananmen Square protests in China were violently repressed by the communist government there, which maintained its grip on power.

In 1989, a wave of revolutions, sometimes called the "Autumn of Nations", swept across the Eastern Bloc.

Major reforms occurred in Hungary following the replacement of János Kádár as General Secretary of the Communist Party in 1988. In Poland in April 1989, the Solidarity organization was legalized and allowed to participate in parliamentary elections. In the elections on 4 June 1989, it captured 99% of available parliamentary seats.

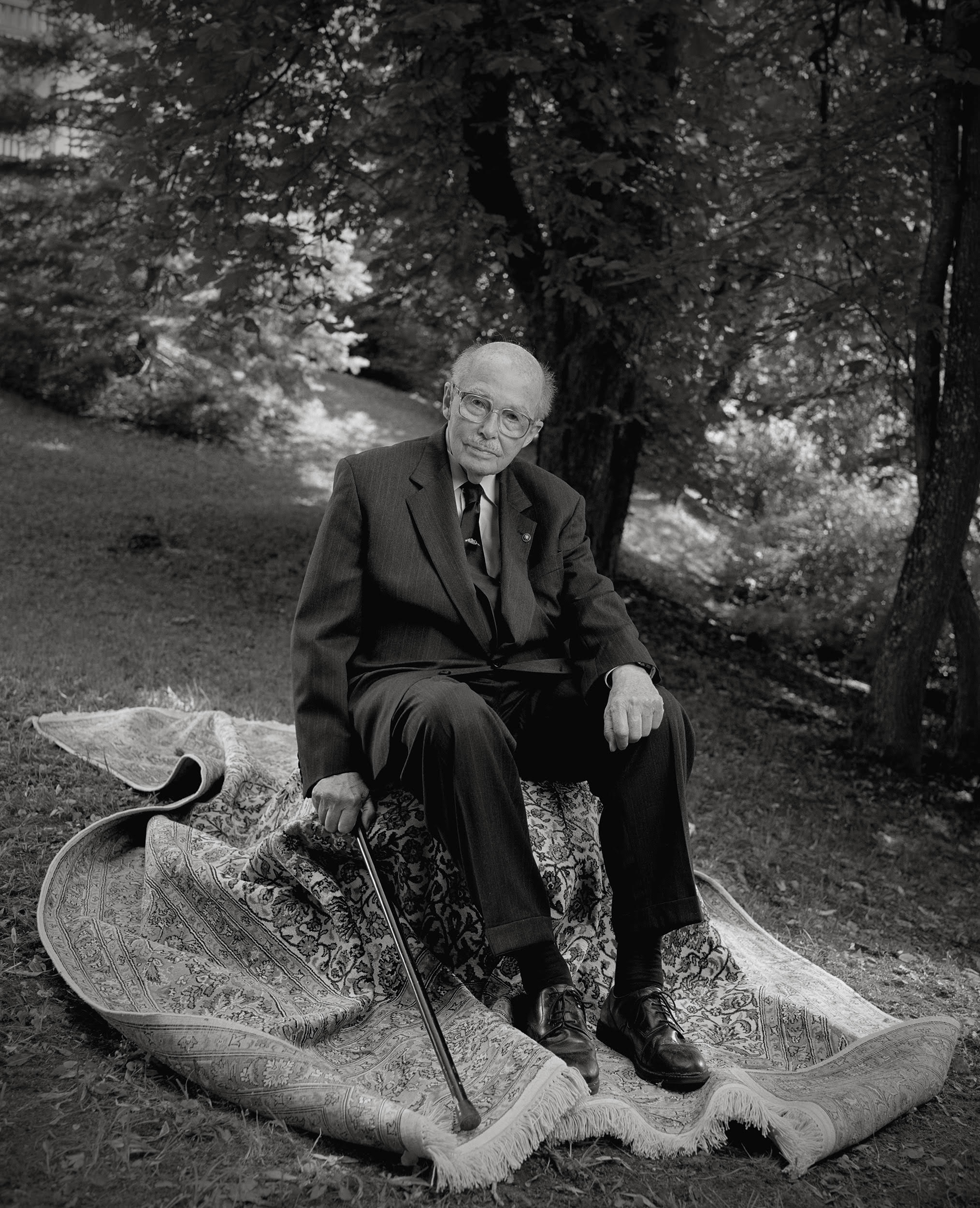
Otto von Habsburg, who played a leading role in opening the Iron Curtain

The opening of the Iron Curtain between Austria and Hungary at the Pan-European Picnic on 19 August 1989 then set in motion a chain reaction, at the end of which there was East Germany and the Eastern Bloc had disintegrated. Extensive advertising for the planned picnic was made by posters and flyers among the GDR holidaymakers in Hungary. The Austrian branch of the Paneuropean Union, which was then headed by Karl von Habsburg, distributed thousands of brochures inviting them to a picnic near the border at Sopron. It was the largest escape movement from East Germany since the time before the Berlin Wall was built in 1961. After the picnic, which was based on an idea by Otto von Habsburg to test the reaction of the USSR and Mikhail Gorbachev to an opening of the border, tens of thousands of media-informed East Germans set off for Hungary. Hungary was then no longer prepared to keep its borders completely closed or to commit its border troops to use force of arms. Erich Honecker dictated to the Daily Mirror for the Paneuropa Picnic: "Habsburg distributed leaflets far into Poland, on which the East German holidaymakers were invited to a picnic. When they came to the picnic, they were given gifts, food and Deutsche Mark, and then they were persuaded to come to the West". The leadership of the GDR in East Berlin did not dare to completely block the borders of their own country and the USSR did not respond at all. Thus the bracket of the Eastern Bloc was broken.

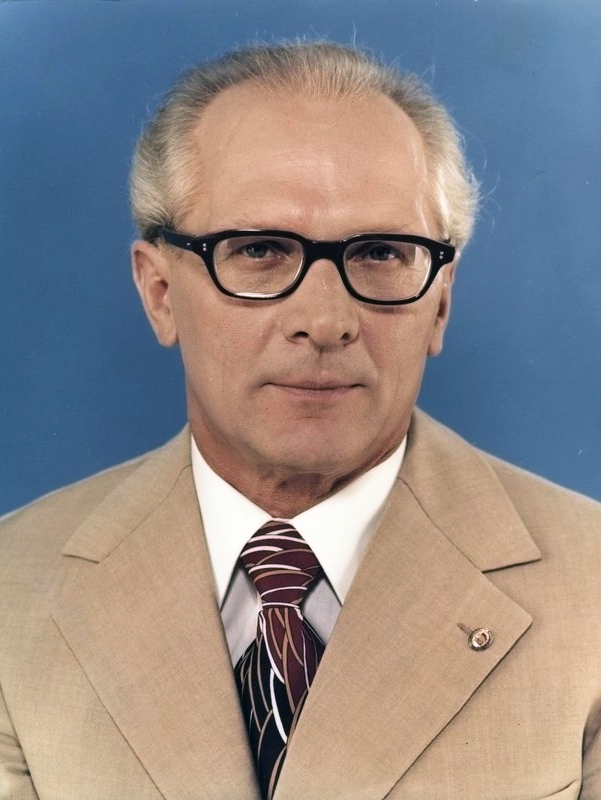
Erich Honecker

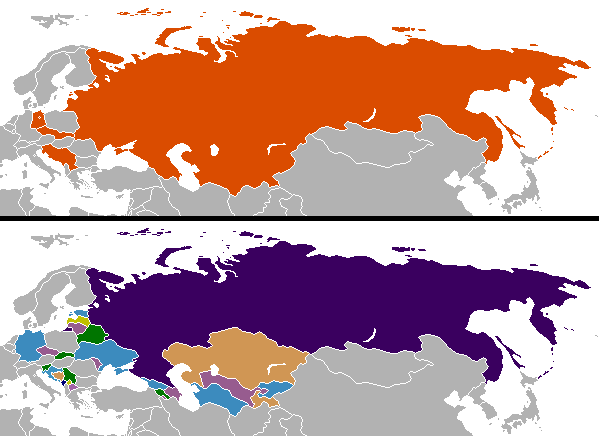
Changes in national boundaries after the collapse of the Eastern Bloc

On 9 November 1989, following mass protests in East Germany and the relaxing of border restrictions in Czechoslovakia, tens of thousands of Eastern Berliners flooded checkpoints along the Berlin Wall and crossed into West Berlin. Parts of the wall were torn down, leading to the reunification of Germany on 3 October 1990; around this time, most of the remains of the wall were torn down. In Bulgaria, the day after the mass crossings through the Berlin Wall, the leader Todor Zhivkov was ousted by his Politburo and replaced with Petar Mladenov.

In Czechoslovakia, following protests of an estimated half-million Czechs and Slovaks demanding freedoms and a general strike, the authorities, which had allowed travel to the West, abolished provisions guaranteeing the ruling Communist Party its leading role. President Gustáv Husák appointed the first largely non-Communist government in Czechoslovakia since 1948 and resigned in what was called the Velvet Revolution.

Since 1971, Romania had reversed the program of de-Stalinization. Following growing public protests, dictator Nicolae Ceaușescu ordered a mass rally in his support outside Communist Party headquarters in Bucharest, but mass protests against Ceaușescu proceeded. The Romanian military sided with protesters and turned on Ceaușescu. They executed him after a brief trial three days later.

Even before the Eastern Bloc's last years, all of the countries in the Warsaw Pact did not always act as a unified bloc. For instance, the 1968 invasion of Czechoslovakia was condemned by Romania, which refused to take part in it. Albania withdrew from the Pact, and the Eastern Bloc altogether, in response to the invasion. In Cambodia, communist rule ended in 1992 and monarchy was restored in 1993.

The only surviving communist states are China, Cuba, Laos, North Korea, and Vietnam. Their state-socialist experience was more in line with decolonization from the Global North and anti-imperialism towards the West instead of the Red Army occupation of the former Eastern Bloc. The five states all adopted economic reforms to varying degrees. This was previously the case in Kazakhstan until 2022, Uzbekistan until 2016, Turkmenistan until 2006, Kyrgyzstan until 2005, Azerbaijan and Georgia until 2003, Armenia until 1998, Moldova until 1997, Ukrainia and Belarus until 1994, Tajikistan until 1992. All presidents of post-Soviet Russia were members of the Communist Party of the Soviet Union (Boris Yeltsin before 1990, Vladimir Putin and Dmitry Medvedev before 1991). Azerbaijan is an authoritarian dominant-party state yet it has officially eliminated mentions of communism from its constitution.

== Legacy ==
=== Aftermath ===
The fall of the Eastern Bloc had varying impacts on former Communist countries in the short and long term. Many factors shaped how post-Communist countries performed economically, both in the transition period of the 1990s and into the 21st century. These included the legacy of the Communist-era planned economy and one-party state—both overall and in each individual country—the state of the economy on the eve of reform, the pace and execution of economic reforms, the status of the rule of law, and the relevant international situation. Some factors applied to every post-Communist country, while others depended on a wide variety of country-specific circumstances.

By the time the Eastern Bloc fell, the economies of former Communist countries were dominated by obsolete and inefficient heavy industry that was largely uncompetitive in a market environment. The planned economies had long stifled innovation, and it often cost more to produce goods than the final product ultimately cost. By the late 1980s, economic imbalances had reached critical levels, and there was a consensus on the need for reform.

Thus, every former Communist country experienced a period of economic recession, decline in industrial production, and during the transition to a market economy. How deep this recession went, how long it lasted, and how fast a given country recovered depended on various domestic and international factors.

Writing in 2016, German historian Philipp Ther asserted that neoliberal policies of liberalization, deregulation, and privatization "had catastrophic effects on former Soviet Bloc countries", and that the imposition of Washington Consensus-inspired "shock therapy" had little to do with future economic growth.

An estimated seven million premature deaths took place in the former USSR after it collapsed, with around four million in Russia alone. Russia experienced the largest drop in life expectancy during peacetime in recorded history after the fall of the USSR. The scholars Kristen Ghodsee and Mitchell A. Orenstein have referred to this as the "mortality belt of the European former Soviet Union" and assert that it could have been avoided with the implementation of "an aggressive health policy intervention" which could have "prevented tens of thousands of excess deaths."

This economic decline was also linked to a wide variety of social consequences, including rising crime and poverty. These varied by country in severity and speed of recovery. By the end of the 1990s, the number of people living below the international poverty line went from 3% in 1987–88 to 20%, or around 88 million people. Only 4% of the region lived on $4 a day or less before the USSR dissolved, but by 1994, this number skyrocketed to 32%. In Russia, Boris Yeltsin's IMF-backed rapid privatization and austerity policies resulted in unemployment rising to double digits and half the Russian population falling into destitution by the early to mid 1990s.

Crime, alcohol use, drug use and suicides all skyrocketed after the fall of the Eastern Bloc. The GDP fell as much as 50% in some republics during the 1990s. By 2000, Russia's GDP was between 30 and 50% of its pre-collapse output.

In 2011, The Guardian published an analysis of the former Soviet countries twenty years after the fall of the USSR. They found that "GDP fell as much as 50 percent in the 1990s in some republics... as capital flight, industrial collapse, hyperinflation and tax avoidance took their toll", but that there was a rebound in the 2000s, and by 2010 "some economies were five times as big as they were in 1991." Life expectancy has grown since 1991 in some of the countries, but fallen in others; likewise, some held free and fair elections, while others remained authoritarian.

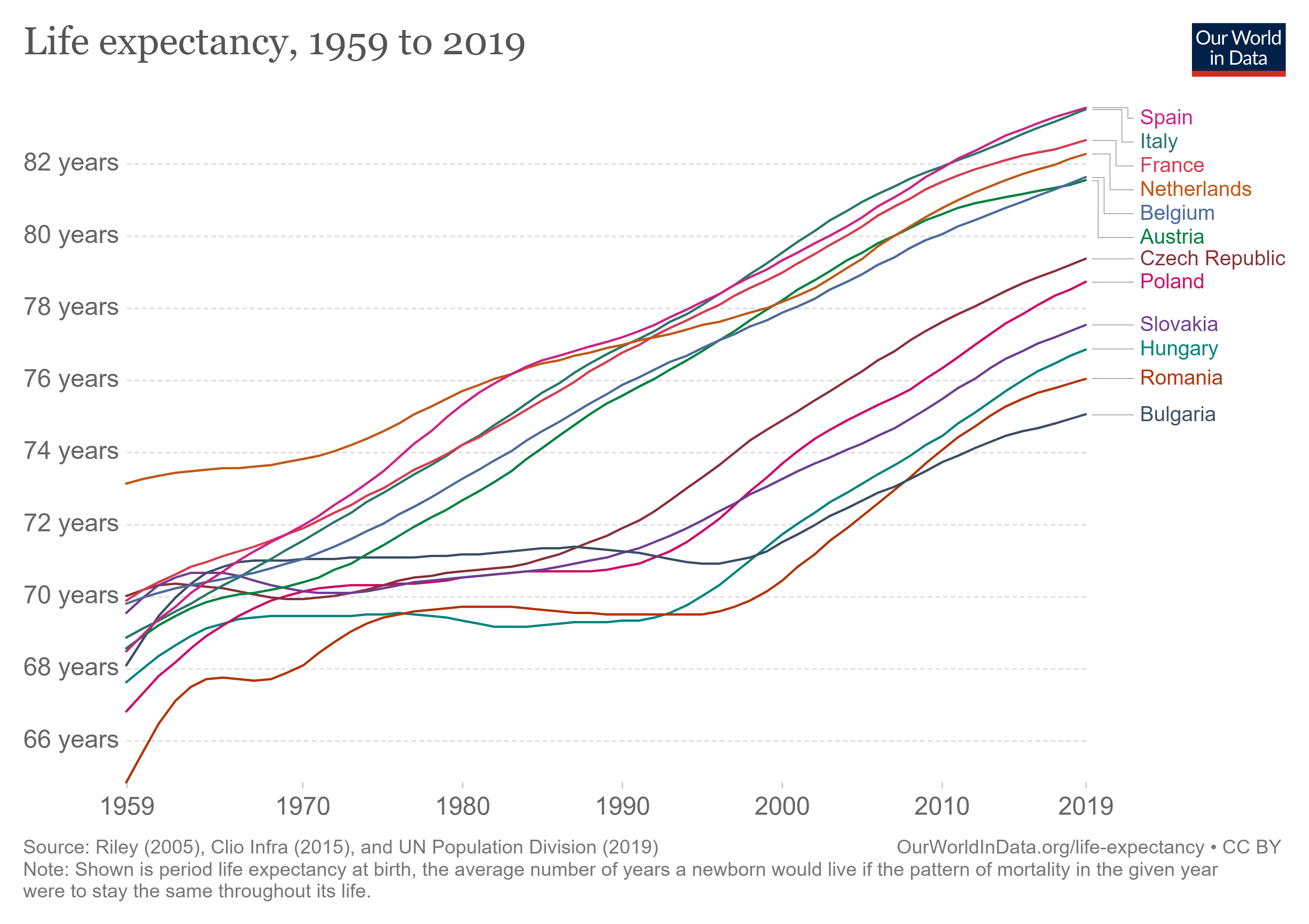
Life expectancy of some Eastern Bloc countries, compared to Western Europe

However, the Central European states of the former Eastern Bloc–Poland, Hungary, the Czech Republic and Slovakia–showed healthy increases in life expectancy from the 1990s onward, compared to nearly thirty years of stagnation under Communism. Bulgaria and Romania followed this trend after the introduction of more serious economic reforms in the late 1990s. By the turn of the century, most of their economies had strong growth rates, boosted by the enlargement of the European Union in 2004 and 2007 which saw Poland, the Czech Republic, Slovakia, Hungary, the Baltic States, Romania and Bulgaria admitted to the European Union. This led to significant improvements in living standards, quality of life, human health and economic performance in the post-Communist Central European states, relative to the late Communist and early post-Communist periods. Certain former Eastern Bloc countries have even become wealthier than certain Western European ones in the decades since 1989. In 2006, the Czech Republic was reported to have become wealthier than Portugal, something also reported to be true of Poland in 2019.

In 2016, the libertarian think tank Cato Institute stated that the analyses done of post-communist countries in the 1990s were "premature" and "that early and rapid reformers by far outperformed gradual reformers" on GDP per capita, the United Nations Human Development Index, political freedom, and developed better institutions. The institute also stated that the process of privatization in Russia was "deeply flawed" due to Russia's reforms being "far less rapid" than those of Central Europe and the Baltic states.

It has been argued by several scholars that the cessation of the Socialist Bloc and the end of communism as a global hegemonic force allowed neoliberal capitalism to become the dominant global system, which has resulted in surging economic inequality.

A 2009 Pew Research Center poll showed that 72% of Hungarians, 62% of both Ukrainians and Bulgarians, 48% of both Lithuanians and Slovaks, 45% of Russians, 39% of Czechs, and 35% of Poles felt that their lives were worse off after 1989, when free markets were made dominant. A follow-up poll by Pew Research Center in 2011 showed that 45% of Lithuanians, 42% of Russians, and 34% of Ukrainians approved of the change to a market economy. Writing in 2018, the scholars Kristen R. Ghodsee and Scott Sehon assert that "subsequent polls and qualitative research across Russia and eastern Europe confirm the persistence of these sentiments as popular discontent with the failed promises of free-market prosperity has grown, especially among older people".

In 2019, a Pew Research Survey on European public opinion asked citizens of Russia, Ukraine, Lithuania, Bulgaria, Poland, Czechia, Slovakia, Hungary and the former East Germany two questions: whether they approved of the change to a multi-party democracy, and whether they approved of the change to a market economy. The change to a multi-party democracy was approved by 85% of Poles and East Germans, 82% of Czechs, 74% of Slovaks, 72% of Hungarians, 70% of Lithuanians, 54% of Bulgarians, 51% of Ukrainians and 43% of Russians. The transition to a market economy was approved by 85% of Poles, 83% of East Germans, 76% of Czechs, 71% of Slovaks, 70% of Hungarians, 69% of Lithuanians, 55% of Bulgarians, 47% of Ukrainians, and 38% of Russians.

=== List of existing communist states ===
A map of current communist states

Since 1993, the following countries have remained communist states:

Country	Local name	Since	Ruling party
China (Note: Hong Kong and Macau are administered under the "One country, two systems" principle.)	In Chinese: 中华人民共和国; In Pinyin: Zhōnghuá Rénmín Gònghéguó	1 October 1949	Chinese Communist Party
Cuba	In Spanish: República de Cuba	1 July 1961	Communist Party of Cuba
Laos	In Lao: Sathalanalat Paxathipatai Paxaxon Lao	2 December 1975	Lao People's Revolutionary Party
North Korea	In Korean: Chosŏnminjujuŭiinmin'gonghwaguk	9 September 1948	Workers' Party of Korea
Vietnam	In Vietnamese: Cộng hòa xã hội chủ nghĩa Việt Nam	2 September 1945 (North Vietnam); 30 April 1975 (South Vietnam); 2 July 1976 (unified)	Communist Party of Vietnam

== See also ==
- Communist nostalgia
- Eastern European Group
- Eurasian Economic Union
- Military occupations by the Soviet Union
- Soviet empire
- Telephone tapping in the Eastern Bloc
- State socialism
- Western Bloc
- Sino-Soviet Split
- First World
- Second World
- Third World
