= Kristen Ghodsee =

American ethnographer and professor

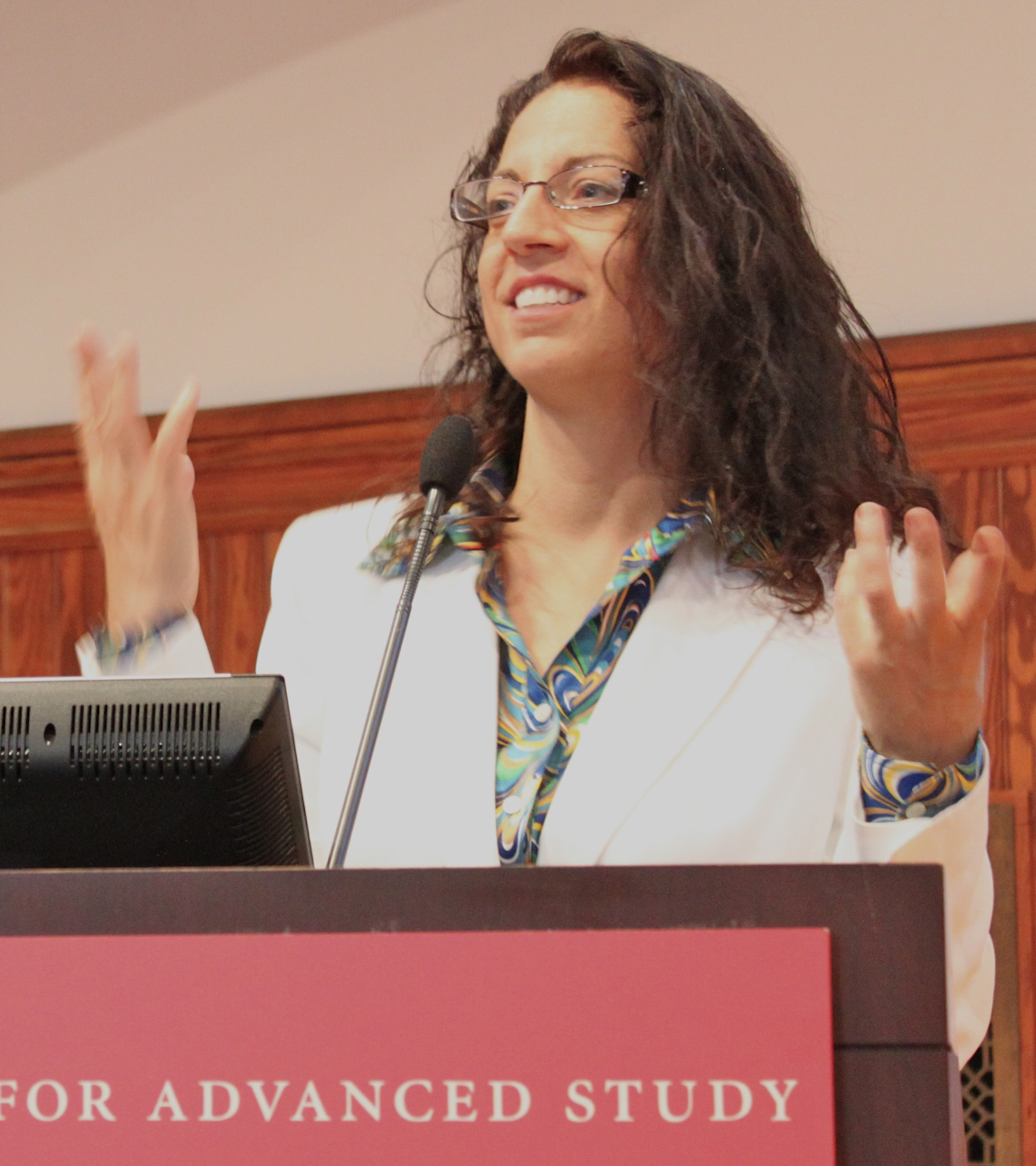
- Ghodsee in 2011
- Born: Kristen Rogheh Ghodsee; April 26, 1970 (age 56)
- Education: University of California, Berkeley; University of California, Santa Cruz
- Awards: Guggenheim Fellowship
- Scientific career
- Fields: Ethnography; Gender studies Feminism; Utopianism; Anthropology
- Workplaces: University of Pennsylvania
- Website: kristenghodsee.com

Kristen Rogheh Ghodsee (born April 26, 1970) is an American ethnographer and Professor of Russian and East European Studies at the University of Pennsylvania. She is primarily known for her ethnographic work on post-Communist Bulgaria as well as being a contributor to the field of postsocialist gender studies. She was critical of the role of Western feminist nongovernmental organizations doing work among East European women in the 1990s. She has also examined the shifting gender relations of Muslim minorities after Communist rule, the intersections of Islamic beliefs and practices with the ideological remains of Marxism–Leninism, communist nostalgia, the legacies of Marxist feminism, and the intellectual history of utopianism.

== Career ==
Ghodsee received her B.A. from the University of California, Santa Cruz and her M.A. and PhD from the University of California, Berkeley. She has been awarded numerous research fellowships, including those from the National Science Foundation, Fulbright, the American Council of Learned Societies, the International Research & Exchanges Board (IREX), and the National Council for Eurasian and East European Research. She was a resident fellow at the Institute for Advanced Study in Princeton, The Woodrow Wilson International Center for Scholars in Washington, The Max Planck Institute for Demographic Research in Rostock, Germany, the Radcliffe Institute for Advanced Study at Harvard University, the Freiburg Institute for Advanced Studies (FRIAS), the Aleksanteri Institute at the University of Helsinki in Finland, and the Imre Kertész Kolleg at the Friedrich-Schiller-Universität in Jena. In 2012, she was elected president of the Society for Humanistic Anthropology.

In 2021, Ghodsee was an invited professor at the Center for History at Sciences Po in Paris, France. In July 2022, she was appointed the chair of the Department of Russian and East European Studies at the University of Pennsylvania.

== Work ==
=== Red nostalgia, victims of Communism, and neoliberalism ===
In 2004, Ghodsee published one of the first articles considering the gendered aspects of the growing Communist nostalgia in Eastern Europe. Already beginning in the late 1990s, various scholars were examining the phenomenon of Ostalgie in former East Germany and what had been called Yugo-nostalgia in the successor states of the former Socialist Yugoslavia. This earlier work on the emergence of Communist nostalgia focused on its consumer aspects and considered the phenomenon a necessary phase that post-Communist populations needed to pass through in order to fully break with their Communist pasts. In contrast, her concept of "red nostalgia" considered how individual men and women experienced the loss of the real material benefits of the socialist past. Rather than just a wistful glance back at a lost youth, red nostalgia formed the basis of an emerging critique of the political and economic upheavals that characterized the postsocialist era.

Ghodsee has explored the politics of public memory about Communist states, World War II, and the Holocaust in Bulgaria. According to Ghodsee, the Victims of Communism Memorial Foundation is a conservative anti-communist organization which seeks to equate communism with murder such as by erecting billboards in Times Square which declare "100 years, 100 million killed" and "Communism kills." Ghodsee posits that the foundation, along with counterpart conservative organizations in Eastern Europe, seeks to institutionalize the "Victims of Communism" narrative as a double genocide theory, or the moral equivalence between the Nazi Holocaust (race murder) and the victims of Communism (class murder). Ghodsee argues the 100 million estimate favored by the foundation is dubious, as their source for this is the controversial introduction to The Black Book of Communism by Stéphane Courtois. She also said that this effort by anti-communist conservative organizations has intensified, in particular during the 2008 financial crisis for commemoration of the latter in Europe, and can be seen as the response by economic and political elites to fears of a leftist resurgence in the face of devastated economies and extreme economic inequality in both the East and West as the result of the excesses of neoliberal capitalism. Ghodsee argued that any discussion of the achievements under Communist states, including literacy, education, women's rights, and social security is usually silenced, and any discourse on the subject of communism is focused almost exclusively on Stalin's crimes and the double genocide theory.

In her 2017 book Red Hangover: Legacies of Twentieth-Century Communism, Ghodsee posits that the triumphalist attitudes of Western powers at the end of the Cold War, and the fixation with linking all leftist and socialist political ideals with the horrors of Stalinism, allowed neoliberalism to fill the void, which undermined democratic institutions and reforms, leaving a trail of economic misery, unemployment, hopelessness and rising inequality throughout the former Eastern Bloc and much of the West in the following decades that has fueled the rise of extremist right-wing nationalism in both the former and the latter. She says that the time has come "to rethink the democratic project and finally do the work necessary to either rescue it from the death grip of neoliberalism, or replace it with a new political ideal that leads us forward to a new stage of human history."

=== Literary ethnography ===
Ghodsee's later work combines traditional ethnography with a literary sensibility, employing the stylistic conventions of creative nonfiction to produce academic texts that are meant to be accessible to a wider audience. Inspired by the work of Clifford Geertz and the conventions of "thick description", she is a proponent of "literary ethnography." This genre uses narrative tension, dialogue and lyrical prose in the presentation of ethnographic data. Furthermore, Ghodsee argues that literary ethnographies are often "documentary ethnographies", i.e. ethnographies whose primary purpose is to explore the inner working of a particular culture without necessarily subsuming these observations to a specific theoretical agenda.

Ghodsee's third book, Lost in Transition: Ethnographies of Everyday Life After Communism, combines personal ethnographic essays with ethnographic fiction to paint a human portrait of the political and economic transition from Communist rule. While some reviewers have found the book "compelling and highly readable", and "an enchanting, deeply intimate and experimental ethnographic narrative", others have faulted the book for telling a story "at the expense of theory." That the book was judged "remarkably free of academic jargon and neologisms" produced very "mixed feelings" within the scholarly community, with one critic stating that "the somewhat unconventional technique of incorporating fiction alongside her [Ghodsee's] ethnographic vignettes feels a bit forced." Outside of academia, however, one reviewer claimed that Lost in Transition "is very easy to read and is, in fact, impossible to put down, largely because it is so well-written."

=== Awards ===
Ghodsee's 2010 book, Muslim Lives in Eastern Europe: Gender, Ethnicity and the Transformation of Islam in Postsocialist Bulgaria was awarded the 2010 Barbara Heldt Prize for the best book, by a woman in Slavic/Eurasian/East European Studies, the 2011 Harvard University/Davis Center Book Prize from the Association for Slavic, East European and Eurasian Studies, the 2011 John D. Bell Book Prize from the Bulgarian Studies Association and the 2011 William A. Douglass Prize in Europeanist Anthropology from the Society for the Anthropology of Europe of the American Anthropological Association.

Ghodsee won the 2011 Ethnographic Fiction Prize from the Society for Humanistic Anthropology for the short story "Tito Trivia," included in her book, Lost in Transition: Ethnographies of Everyday Life After Communism. Together with co-author, Charles Dorn, Ghodsee was awarded the 2012 Best Article Prize from the History of Education Society (HES) for the article in the journal Diplomatic History: “The Cold War Politicization of Literacy: UNESCO, Communism, and the World Bank.” In 2012, she won a John Simon Guggenheim Fellowship for her work in anthropology and cultural studies.

== Scholarly feminist review ==
In a 2014 essay in the European Journal of Women's Studies, philosopher Nanette Funk included Ghodsee among a handful of "Revisionist Feminist Scholars" who uncritically tout the achievements of communist-era women's organizations, ignoring the oppressive nature of authoritarian regimes in Eastern Europe. Funk argued that the "Feminist Revisionists" are too eager in their "desire to find women’s agency in an anti-capitalist Marxist past" and that this "leads to distortions" and "making overly bold claims" about the possibilities for feminist activism under Communist states.

In response, Ghodsee asserts that her scholarship seeks to expand the idea of feminism beyond the attainment of "personal self-actualization", asserting that "if the goal of feminism is to improve women's lives, along with eliminating discrimination and promoting equality with men, then there is ample room to reconsider what Krassimira Daskalova calls the 'women-friendly' policies of state socialist women's organizations". She notes that "the goal of much recent scholarship on state socialist women's organizations is to show how the communist ideology could lead to real improvements in women's literacy, education, professional training, as well as access to health care, the extension of paid maternity leave, and a reduction of their economic dependence on men (facts that even Funk does not deny)".

== Personal life ==
Ghodsee identifies herself as being of "Puerto Rican-Persian" heritage. Her father was Persian, and her mother Puerto Rican. Ghodsee grew up in San Diego. While attending university she met and married a Bulgarian law student. She is the mother of one teenage daughter.

== Books ==
- Kristen R. Ghodsee, Everyday Utopia: What 2,000 Years of Wild Experiments Can Teach Us About the Good Life. New York: Simon & Schuster, 2023. ISBN 978-1982190217
- Kristen Ghodsee, Red Valkyries: Feminist Lessons from Five Revolutionary Women. New York and London: Verso Books, 2022. ISBN 978-1839766602
- Kristen Ghodsee and Mitchell A. Orenstein, Taking Stock of Shock: Social Consequences of the 1989 Revolutions. New York: Oxford University Press, 2021. ISBN 978-0197549247
- Kristen R. Ghodsee, Second World, Second Sex: Socialist Women's Activism and Global Solidarity during the Cold War, Durham, Duke University Press, 2019. ISBN 978-1478001812
- Kristen R. Ghodsee, Why Women Have Better Sex Under Socialism and other arguments for economic independence, Nation Books, 2018. ISBN 9781568588902 Also available in Spanish, French, German, Portuguese, Dutch, Russian, Polish, Czech, Slovak, Indonesian, Thai, Korean, and Japanese.
- Kristen Ghodsee, Red Hangover: Legacies of Twentieth-Century Communism, Durham, Duke University Press, 2017. ISBN 978-0822369493
- Kristen Ghodsee, From Notes to Narrative: Writing Ethnographies that Everyone Can Read. Chicago: University of Chicago Press, 2016. ISBN 978-0226257556
- Kristen Ghodsee, The Left Side of History: World War II and the Unfulfilled Promise of Communism in Eastern Europe, Durham, Duke University Press, 2015. ISBN 978-0822358350
- Kristen Ghodsee, Lost in Transition: Ethnographies of Everyday Life After Communism, Durham: Duke University Press, 2011. ISBN 978-0822351023
- Kristen Ghodsee, Muslim Lives in Eastern Europe: Gender, Ethnicity and the Transformation of Islam in Postsocialist Bulgaria. Princeton: Princeton University Press, 2009. ISBN 978-0691139555
- Kristen Ghodsee, ' The Red Riviera: Gender, Tourism and Postsocialism on the Black Sea, Durham: Duke University Press, 2005. ISBN 978-0822336624
- Rachel Connelly and Kristen Ghodsee, Professor Mommy: Finding Work/Family Balance in Academia, Rowman & Littlefield Publishers, Inc., 2011. ISBN 978-1442208582

== Significant journal articles ==
- "Pressuring the Politburo: The Committee of the Bulgarian Women's Movement and State Socialist Feminism," Slavic Review, Volume 73, Number 2, Fall 2014.
- "Rethinking State Socialist Mass Women's Organizations: The Committee of the Bulgarian Women's Movement and the United Nations Decade for Women, 1975–1985", Journal of Women's History, Volume 24, Number 4, Winter 2012.
- "Subtle Censorships: Notes on Studying Bulgarian Women's Lives Under Communism," Journal of Women's History: Beyond the Page, Fall 2012
- "Feminism-by-Design: Emerging Capitalisms, Cultural Feminism and Women's Nongovernmental Organizations in Post-Socialist Eastern Europe," Signs: Journal of Women in Culture and Society, Spring 2004 (Vol. 29, No. 3)
- With Amy Borovoy Borovoy, Amy; Ghodsee, Kristen (May–June 2012). "Decentering agency in feminist theory: Recuperating the family as a social project". Women's Studies International Forum. 35 (3): 153–165. doi:10.1016/j.wsif.2012.03.003.
- Ghodsee, Kristen (July–August 2011). "On feminism, philosophy and politics in Post-communist Romania: An interview with Mihaela Miroiu (Bucharest, 17 May 2010)". Women's Studies International Forum. 34 (4): 302–307. doi:10.1016/j.wsif.2011.04.005.
- "Socialist Secularism: Gender, Religion and Modernity in Bulgaria and Yugoslavia, 1946-1989" with Pam Ballinger, Aspasia: The International Yearbook of Central, Eastern, and Southeastern European Women's and Gender History, Vol. 5: 6–27
- Ghodsee, Kristen (January–February 2010). "Revisiting the United Nations decade for women: Brief reflections on feminism, capitalism and Cold War politics in the early years of the international women's movement". Women's Studies International Forum. 33 (1): 3–12. doi:10.1016/j.wsif.2009.11.008.
- "Minarets after Marx: Islam, Communist Nostalgia, and the Common Good in Postsocialist Bulgaria." East European Politics & Societies, November 2010 24: 520–542
- "Left Wing, Right Wing, Everything: Xenophobia, Neo-totalitarianism and Populist Politics in Contemporary Bulgaria", Problems of Post-Communism, (Vol. 55, No. 3 May–June 2008)
- "Religious Freedoms versus Gender Equality: Faith-Based Organizations, Muslim Minorities and Islamic Headscarves in Modern Bulgaria," Social Politics, (Vol. 14, No. 4, 2007)
- "Red Nostalgia? Communism, Women's Emancipation, and Economic Transformation in Bulgaria," L'Homme: Zeitschrift für Feministische Geschichtswissenschaft (Journal for Feminist History), Spring 2004 (Vol. 15, No. 1/2004).
- "And if the Shoe Doesn't Fit? (Wear it Anyway?): Economic Transformation and Western Paradigm of 'Women in Development' in Post-Communist Central and Eastern Europe", Women's Studies Quarterly, Fall & Winter 2003 (Vol. 31, No. 3 & 4)
- Revisiting 1989: The Specter Still Haunts, Dissent Magazine, Spring 2012
- "Коса ("Hair" in Bulgarian) разказ от Кристен Ghodsee (in Bulgarian)
- "Tito Trivia" Anthropology and Humanism, Vol. 37, No. 1, June 2012: 105–108.
- Ghodsee (2014). "A Tale of "Two Totalitarianisms": The Crisis of Capitalism and the Historical Memory of Communism" (PDF). History of the Present. 4 (2): 115–142. doi:10.5406/historypresent.4.2.0115. JSTOR 10.5406/historypresent.4.2.0115.
- "What Has Socialism Ever Done For Women?" (with Julia Mead) Catalyst. Vol. 2, No. 2, Summer 2018. 100–133

== See also ==
- Anti anti-communism
- Gender roles in post-communist Central and Eastern Europe
