= Post-communism =

1980s–1990s period of transition in communist states

GDP per capita of the (former) USSR (1946–2022)

GDP per capita in the post-Soviet states (1973–2022)

GDP per capita of Warsaw Pact members who joined the EU (1973–2022)

Post-communism is the period of political and economic transformation or transition in post-Soviet states and other formerly communist states located in Central Europe, Eastern Europe and parts of Latin America, Africa, and Asia, in which new governments aimed to create free market-oriented capitalist economies. From 1989 until 1992, communist party governance collapsed in most communist party-governed states. After severe hardships, communist parties retained control in China, Cuba, Laos, North Korea, and Vietnam. SFR Yugoslavia began to disintegrate, which plunged the country into a long complex series of wars between ethnic groups and nation-states. Soviet-oriented communist movements collapsed in countries where they were not in control.

== Politics ==
The policies of most communist parties in both the Eastern and Western Blocs had been governed by the example of the Soviet Union. In most countries in the Eastern Bloc, following the Revolutions of 1989 and the fall of communist-led governments that marked the end of the Cold War, the communist parties split in two factions: a reformist social democratic party and a new less reformist-oriented communist party. The newly created social democratic parties were generally larger and more powerful than the remaining communist parties—only in Belarus, Ukraine, Kazakhstan, Moldova, Russia, and Tajikistan did the communist parties remain a significant force.

In the Western Bloc, many of the self-styled communist parties reacted by changing their policies to a social democratic and democratic socialist course. In countries such as Japan, Italy and reunited Germany, post-communism is marked by the increased influence of their existing social democrats. The anti-Soviet communist parties in the Western Bloc (e.g. the Trotskyist parties) who felt that the dissolution of the Soviet Union vindicated their views and predictions did not particularly prosper from it—in fact, some became less radical as well.

== Economy ==
Several communist states had undergone economic reforms from a command economy towards a more market-oriented economy in the 1980s, notably Hungary, Poland, Bulgaria and Yugoslavia. The post-communist economic transition was much more abrupt and aimed at creating fully capitalist economies.

All the countries concerned have abandoned the traditional tools of communist economic control and moved more or less successfully toward free-market systems. Although some, such as Charles Paul Lewis, stress the beneficial effect of multinational investment, the reforms also had important negative consequences that are still unfolding. Average standards of living registered a catastrophic fall in the early 1990s in many parts of the former Comecon—most notably in the former Soviet Union—and began to rise again only toward the end of the decade. Some populations are still considerably worse off today than they were in 1989 (e.g. Moldova, and Serbia). Others have bounced back considerably beyond that threshold (e.g. the Czech Republic, Hungary, and Poland) and some such as Estonia, Latvia, Lithuania (Baltic Tiger), and Slovakia (Tatra Tiger) underwent an economic boom, although all have suffered from the Great Recession, except for Poland, which was one of two countries (the other was Albania) in Europe maintained growth despite the Great Recession.

Armenia's economy, like that of other former states of Soviet Union, suffered from the consequences of a centrally-planned economy and the collapse of former Soviet trade patterns. Another important aspect for difficulty of standing up after the collapse is that the investment and funding that was coming to Armenian industry from Soviet Union has been gone, leaving only a few large enterprises in operation. Furthermore, the aftereffects of the 1988 Armenian earthquake were still being felt. Despite the fact that a cease-fire has been in place since 1994, the dispute with Azerbaijan over Nagorno-Karabakh has not been resolved. Since Armenia was heavily dependent on outside supplies of energy and most raw materials at that time, the resulting closure of both the Azerbaijani and Turkish borders has devastated the economy. During 1992–1993, the GDP had dropped around 60% from its peak in 1989. Few years after adoption of national currency, the dram in 1993, it experienced hyperinflation.

As of 2021, most post-communist countries in Europe are generally seen to have mixed economies, although some such as Estonia, Romania, and Slovakia often adopt more traditionally free-market policies, such as flat tax rates, than does the Western Bloc. A fundamental challenge in post-communist economies is that institutional pressures that reflect the logic of capitalism and democracy are exerted on organizations, including business firms and government agencies, that were created under communism and to this day are run by managers socialized in that context, resulting in a great deal of continuing tension in organizations in post-communist states.

== See also ==
- Communist nostalgia
  - Nostalgia for the German Democratic Republic
  - Nostalgia for the Polish People's Republic
  - Nostalgia for the Socialist Federal Republic of Yugoslavia
  - Nostalgia for the Soviet Union
- Dissolution of the Soviet Union
- Eurocommunism
- Fall of communism in Albania
- Gender roles in post-communist Central and Eastern Europe
- History of communism#Contemporary communism (1993–present)
- List of communist parties with national parliamentary representation
- Neoauthoritarianism (China)
- Postsocialism
- Predictions of the collapse of the Soviet Union
- Reform and opening up
- Revolutions of 1989
- World communism
