= Warm ice cream =

Polish dessert

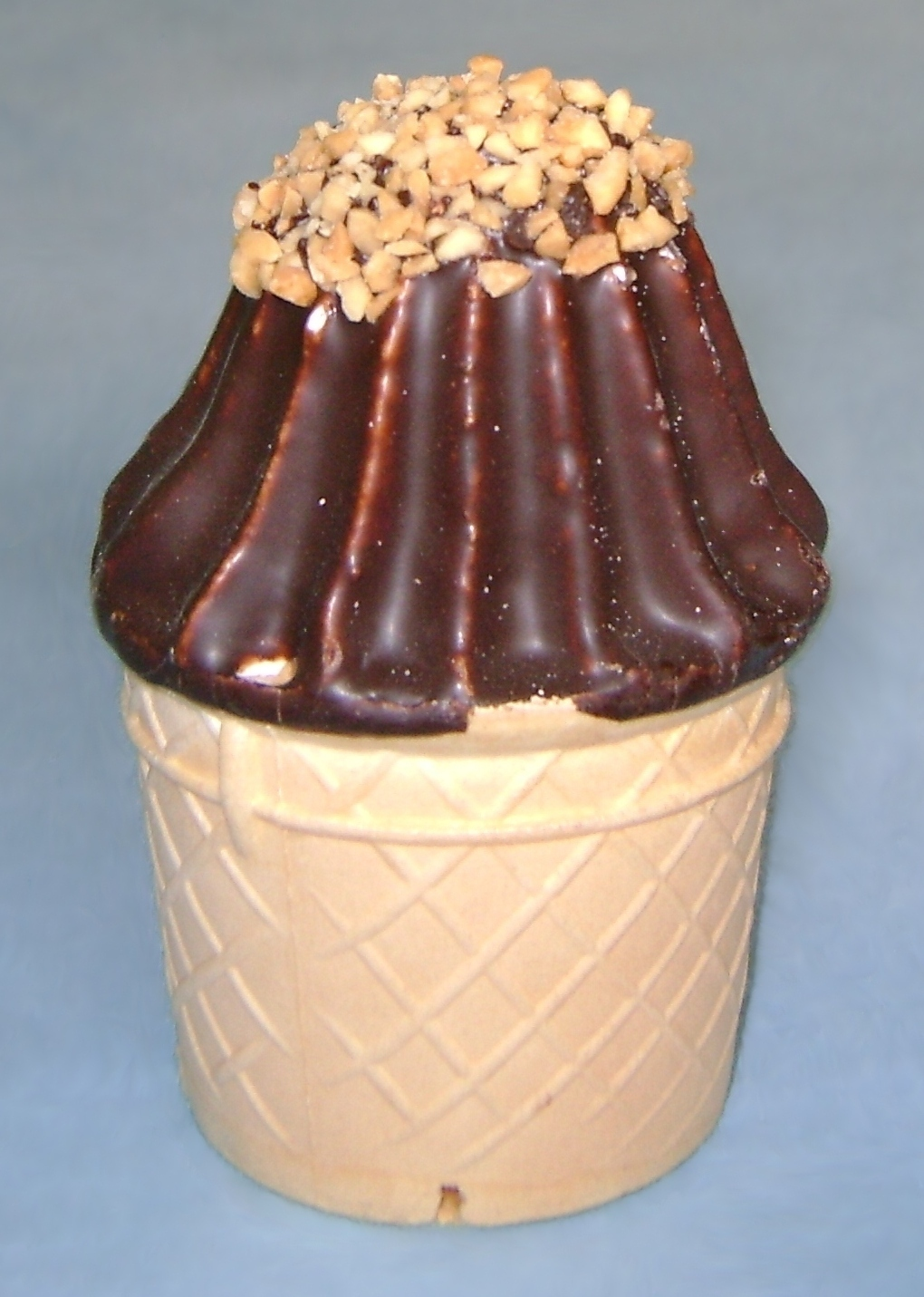
- Ciepłe lody
- Alternative names: Ciepłe lody
- Type: Cake
- Course: Dessert
- Place of origin: Poland
- Invented: 1950s
- Serving temperature: Room temperature
- Main ingredients: Waffle, mousse

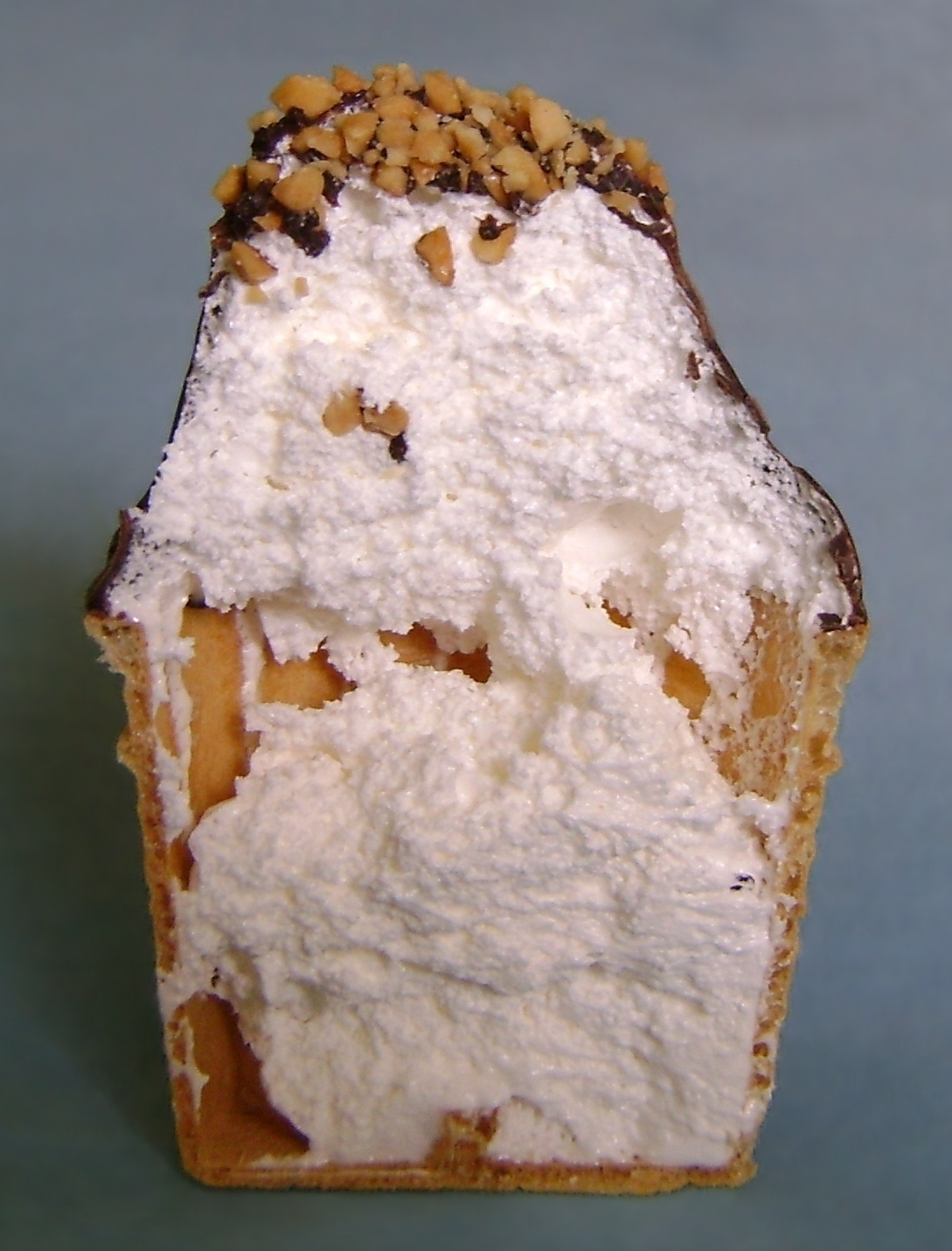
Warm ice cream cross-section

Warm ice cream (Polish: ciepłe lody) is a Polish dessert made of egg white-based mousse topped by syrup, chocolate, or other topping, and presented in a waffle cup, resembling soft serve ice cream, and as such giving name to the dessert. It is relatively cheap and high in calories.

The Polish weekly Wprost writes that warm ice creams were an invention of nutritionists of the Polish People's Republic, one of ersatz foods, along with Polo-Cockta. Its production was renewed in modern Poland as part of PRL nostalgia.

Similar chocolate-coated marshmallow treats, including German Schokoküsse, Danish Flødeboller, and the Israeli Krembo were also called "warm ice cream" in Poland.

In Hungary a similar dessert is called télifagyi ("winter ice cream"). It was invented and reached the height of its popularity during Soviet times, but is still widely available.

== See also ==
- List of Polish dishes
