= Communist nostalgia =

Retrospective fondness for average life in the Eastern Bloc

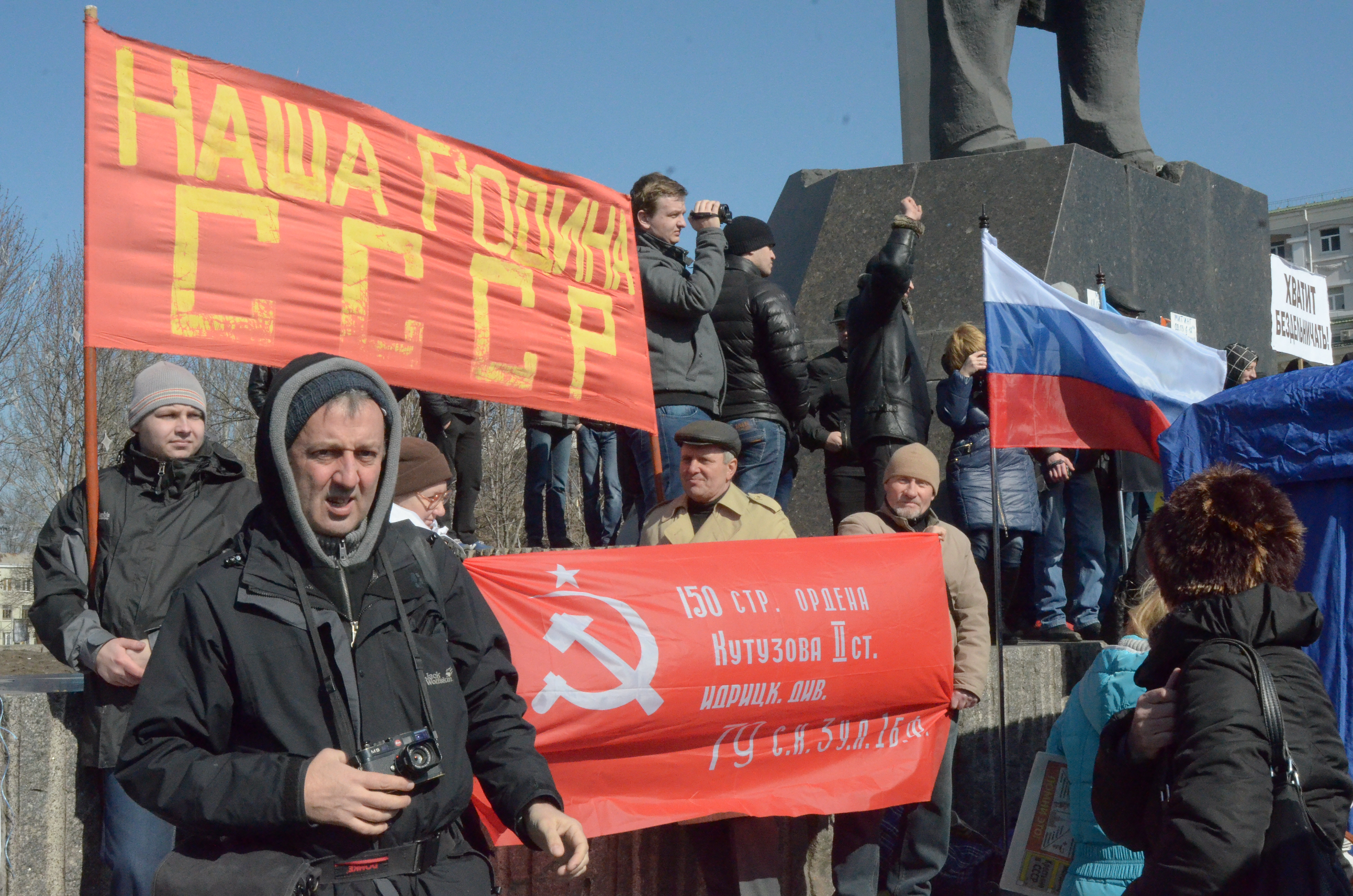
Protest against Ukrainian decommunization policies in Donetsk, 2014. The red banner reads, "Our homeland is USSR". Also pictured is a copy of the Banner of Victory.

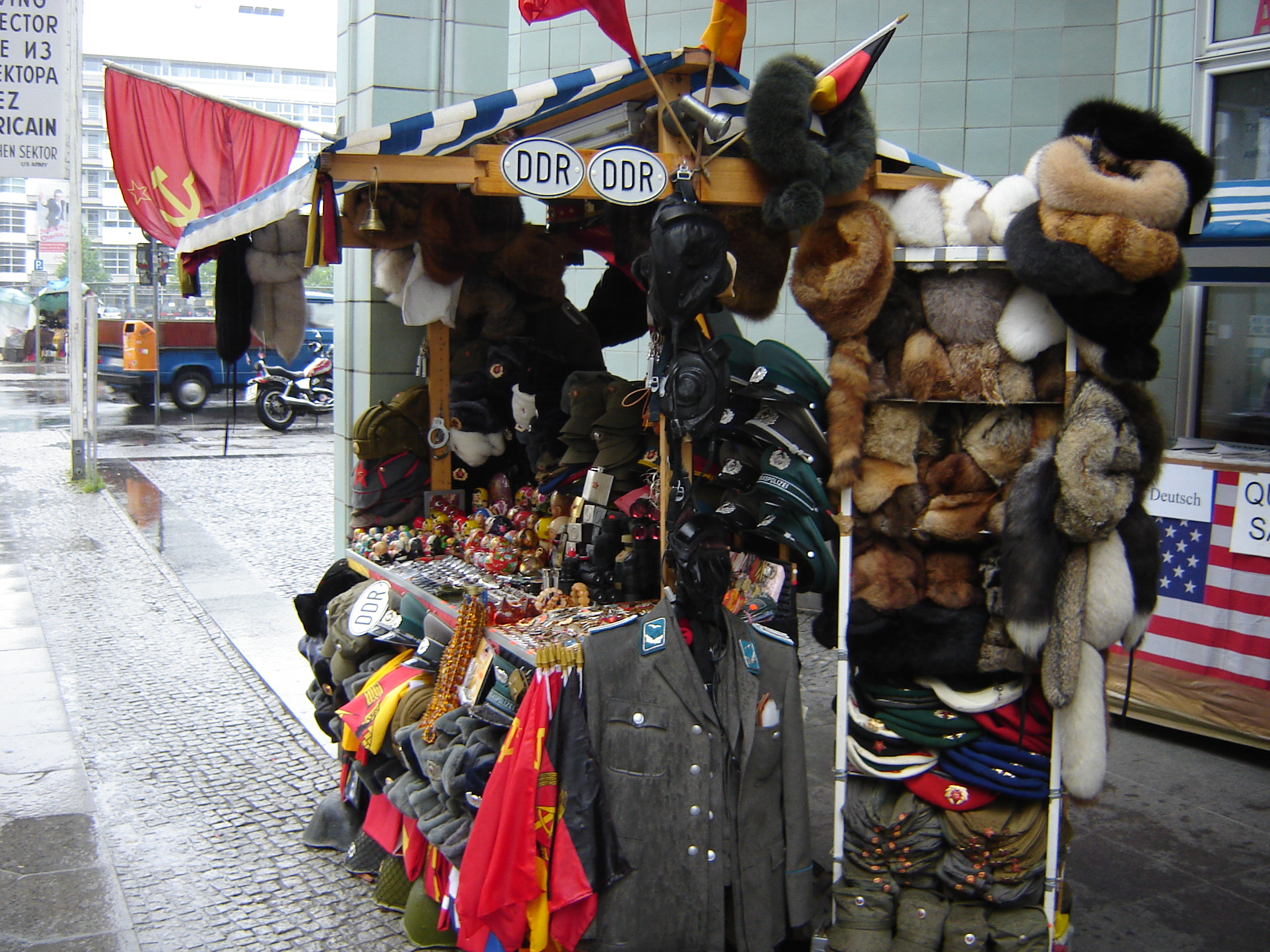
Soviet and GDR memorabilia for sale in Berlin in 2006

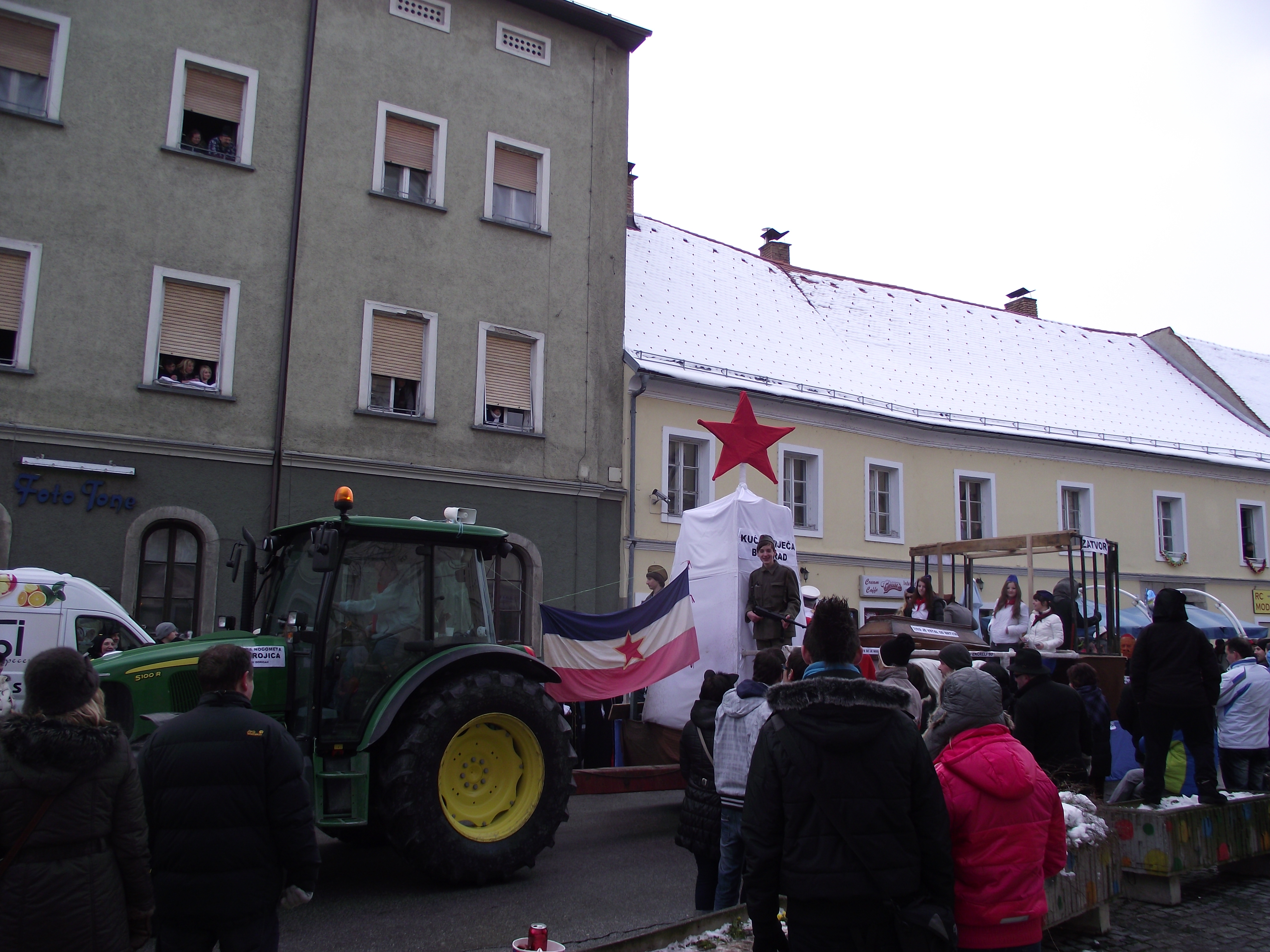
Yugoslav symbols during a carnival in Ptuj, Slovenia, in 2013

Communist nostalgia, also called communism nostalgia or socialist nostalgia, is the nostalgia in various post-communist states (namely in Central and Eastern Europe and Russia) for the prior communist states.

Examples of such nostalgia can be observed in East Germany, Poland, the former Soviet Union, former Yugoslavia, Bulgaria, Hungary, Romania, the Czech Republic, Albania, and Slovakia. Businesses have commercialized and commodified communist nostalgia in the form of communist chic and other commodities and products reminiscent of the former era.

== Insight ==
Dominik Bartmanski notes that after the anti-communist revolutions of 1989, the specific perspectives of the development remained unclear for some time, they were expressed in generic terms such as "return to Europe", "to Western values" and the like. This resulted in utopian expectations regarding capitalism and democracy. When confronted with the hardships of the transition, the "post-revolutionary utopianism" produced "post-revolutionary disenchantment".

According to Kristen R. Ghodsee, a researcher on post-communist Eastern Europe:

"Only by examining how the quotidian aspects of daily life were affected by great social, political and economic changes can we make sense of the desire for this collectively imagined, more egalitarian past. Nobody wants to revive 20th century totalitarianism. But nostalgia for communism has become a common language through which ordinary men and women express disappointment with the shortcomings of parliamentary democracy and neoliberal capitalism today."

== Polling ==
=== Soviet Union ===
==== Armenia ====
A 2013 Gallup survey showed that 66% of Armenians thought the dissolution of the USSR was harmful, the highest of any country surveyed, compared to 12% who thought it was beneficial. A 2016 survey showed that 71% of Armenians believed life was better under the USSR. Regret about dissolution later increased to 79% according to a 2017 Pew survey, compared to just 15% saying dissolution was a good thing.

==== Azerbaijan ====
A 2013 Gallup survey showed that 31% of Azerbaijanis thought the dissolution of the USSR was harmful, compared to 44% who thought it was beneficial. In a 2016 survey, 69% of Azerbaijanis believed life was better under the USSR.

==== Belarus ====
In a 1998 survey, Belarusians were the 2nd-most favorable, behind just Ukraine, towards the communist economic system at 78%. However by 2006, only 39% of Belarusians agreed that "It is a great misfortune that the USSR no longer exists", compared to 49% who did not agree. In addition, compared to Russians and Ukrainians, Belarusians were the most favorable towards the current system at 35% preferring it as the most suitable political system. Combined with those who supported Western democracy (22%) gets a total of 57%, compared to 28% who support a Soviet-based system (20% supporting a democratized Soviet system, 8% supporting a pre-perestroika Soviet system). Furthermore, 43% of Belarusians supported a market economy compared to 27% who supported a Soviet-style planned economy, and 49% said Belarus should follow its own unique path of development (followed by 40% saying it should follow the path of Europe, and 5% saying it should follow the path the USSR was taking). A majority of Belarusians (55%) supported closer cooperation within the Commonwealth of Independent States instead of a full union (16%).

However by 2013, a Gallup survey showed that 38% of Belarusians thought the dissolution of the USSR was harmful, compared to just 26% who thought it was beneficial. In a 2016 survey, it increased to 53% of Belarusians saying life was better under the USSR. Regret about dissolution later increased again slightly to 54%, compared to 34% saying dissolution was a good thing according to a 2017 Pew survey.

==== Estonia ====
In a 2017 survey, 75% of Estonians said the dissolution of the USSR was a good thing, compared to only 15% who said it was a bad thing.

==== Georgia ====
A 2013 Gallup survey showed that 33% of Georgians thought the dissolution of the USSR was harmful, compared to 37% who thought it was beneficial. Later, a 2017 survey showed that 47% of Georgians thought the dissolution was a good thing, compared to 38% who thought it was a bad thing. Another Pew survey, also in 2017, showed that 43% of Georgians thought the dissolution was a good thing, compared to 42% who thought it was a bad thing.

==== Latvia ====
In a 2017 Pew survey, 30% of Latvians said the dissolution of the USSR was a bad thing, while 53% said it was a good thing.

==== Lithuania ====
In 2017, Pew survey showed that 62% of Lithuanians believed the dissolution of the USSR was a good thing, compared to 23% who said it was a bad thing. In 2019, another Pew survey showed that in 1991 only 13% of Lithuanians rated their life as "good", while in 2019 that number was 44%. Additionally, according to the 2019 survey, 60% of Lithuanians stated that the economic situation in the country is "good" and 61% believed that their children will be better off financially compared to the parents. Similarly, 69% approved the change to multi-party system and 70% approved the change to market economy.

==== Moldova ====
A 2013 Gallup survey showed that 42% of Moldovans thought the dissolution of the USSR was harmful, compared to 26% who thought it was beneficial. Regret about dissolution later increased to 70% according to a 2017 Pew survey, with only 18% saying the dissolution was a good thing.

==== Kazakhstan ====
In 2005, a survey showed that 49.7% of Kazakhs "strongly agreed or agreed" that the Soviet government responded to the citizens' needs, compared to only 9.1% saying the current Kazakh government responded to citizens' needs. However, a 2013 Gallup survey showed that 25% of Kazakhs thought the dissolution of the USSR was harmful, compared to 45% who thought it was beneficial. In a 2016 survey, around 60% of Kazakhs above the age of 35 believed life was better under the USSR.

==== Kyrgyzstan ====
In 2005, a survey showed that 70.3% of Kyrgyz "strongly agreed or agreed" that the Soviet government responded to citizens' needs, compared to only 16.9% saying the same about the current Kyrgyz government. A 2013 Gallup survey showed that 61% of Kyrgyz thought the dissolution of the USSR was harmful, compared to 16% who thought it was beneficial.

==== Russia ====
In a 2005 survey, 66% of Russians said they agreed "It is a great misfortune that the USSR no longer exists", while only 30% disagreed. In addition, 57% supported some form of Soviet-based system as their preferred political system (35% supporting a democratized Soviet system, 22% supporting a pre-perestroika system), compared to 32% who supported a non-Soviet system (17% supporting the current system, 15% supporting Western democracy). An equal percentage of Russians (34%) supported a market economy or a Soviet-style planned economy. However, 59% supported Russia going on its own unique path of development, as opposed to following the path of the USSR (11%) or Europe (25%). A plurality of Russians supported uniting the CiS (39%), higher than those supporting just closer cooperation (37%) and the same amount of cooperation (10%).

Polling data from the Levada Center since 1992 shows consistent rates of regret for the dissolution of the Soviet Union, with the most recent poll in 2021 finding that 63% of Russians regret the dissolution, with only 28% saying they do not regret its dissolution. Regret was lowest in 2012, when only 49% of Russians said they regretted the dissolution. However, this was still higher than the percentage not regretting it of 36%. The most common reasons listed for regret are the end of the unified economic system, and them no longer being citizens of a superpower.

Levada polling since the mid-1990s on the preferred political and economic system of Russians also shows nostalgia for the Soviet Union, with the most recent polling in 2021 showing 49% preferring the Soviet political system, compared to 18% preferring the current system, and 16% preferring Western democracy, as well as 62% saying they preferred a system of economic planning compared to 24% preferring a market capitalist economy.

In a 2020 Levada Center survey, 75% of Russians agreed that the Soviet era was the "greatest time" in the history of Russia.

Date	% regretting the dissolution	% not regretting the dissolution	Source
March 1992	66%	23%	
March 1993	63%	23%	
August 1994	66%	19%	
March 1999	74%	16%	
December 2000	75%	19%	
December 2001	72%	21%	
December 2002	68%	25%	
December 2004	68%	26%	
November 2005	65%	25%	
November 2006	61%	30%	
November 2007	55%	36%	
November 2008	60%	30%	
November 2009	60%	28%	
November 2010	55%	30%	
November 2011	53%	32%	
December 2012	49%	36%	
December 2013	57%	30%	
November 2014	54%	28%	
November 2015	54%	37%	
March 2016	56%	28%	
November 2016	56%	28%	
November 2017	58%	26%	
November 2018	66%	25%	
November 2020	65%	26%	
November 2021	63%	28%	

==== Tajikistan ====
A 2013 Gallup survey showed that 52% of Tajiks thought the dissolution of the USSR was harmful, compared to 27% who thought it was beneficial. By 2016, only 39% of Tajiks had believed life under the USSR was better.

==== Turkmenistan ====
A 2013 Gallup survey showed that only 8% of Turkmen thought the dissolution of the USSR was harmful, the lowest of any country surveyed, compared to 62% who thought it was beneficial.

==== Ukraine ====
In a 1998 survey, Ukraine had the highest approval out of any former communist state for the communist economic system at 90%. Ukraine also had the highest approval of the communist government system at 82%, the highest approval of communism as an ideology at 59%, and the highest support for a communist restoration at 51%.

However, gradually Ukraine would start to have less favorable views on its Soviet past. In a 2006 survey, only 42% of Ukrainians agreed that "It is a great misfortune that the USSR no longer exists" compared to 49% who disagreed. However, when asked their preferred political system, 46% of respondents preferred some form of Soviet system (31% supporting a democratized version, 16% supporting a pre-perestroika version) compared to 42% who supported a non-Soviet system (18% supporting the current system, 24% supporting a Western democracy). 44% supported a market economy compared to 25% who supported a Soviet-style planned economy. 49% of Ukrainians also stated that Ukraine should follow its own unique way of development, rather than follow the path of Europe (31%) or the path the USSR was taking (13%). 52% supported closer cooperation with the CiS rather than a full union (17%).

In a 2009 Pew survey, 62% of Ukrainians said life was worse economically nowadays compared to the Soviet era. A 2013 Gallup survey showed that 56% of Ukrainians thought the dissolution of the USSR was harmful, while only 23% thought it was beneficial. In a 2016 survey, 60% of Ukrainians above the age of 35 said life was better under the USSR. However, by 2020, a survey from the Kyiv International Institute of Sociology showed that 34% of Ukrainians regretted the dissolution of the USSR, compared to 50% who do not regret it. Regret was highest in Eastern Ukraine where 49% of Ukrainians regretted it compared to 35% who did not, while it was lowest in Western Ukraine where only 15% regretted it compared to 69% who did not.

Attitudes toward the Soviet past changed substantially after Russia’s full-scale invasion in 2022. A September–October 2022 poll by the Razumkov Center found that nearly 90% of Ukrainians did not want to restore the USSR. Another survey in 2022 found that only 11% of respondents said they missed the Soviet Union, while 87% said they did not. Later polling also indicated a strong shift toward Ukrainian national identity, with only 2% of Ukrainians identifying primarily with the USSR in 2024.

==== Uzbekistan ====
In 2005, a survey showed that 48.1% of Uzbeks said the Soviet government responded to citizens' needs, compared to 28.1% saying the same about the current government. However, in 2016, only 4% of Uzbeks believed life was better under the USSR.

=== Other Warsaw Pact members ===
==== Bulgaria ====
In a 2009 Pew survey, 62% of Bulgarians said life was worse economically nowadays compared to the Warsaw Pact era. In a 2019 survey, 45% of Bulgarians said that life was better under communist leader Todor Zhivkov, while 22% said life was worse. 74% agree with the popular cliché "They ruined this country". In a 2023 survey from the National Center for Parliamentary Studies, 32.6% of Bulgarians said they would prefer to live in the socialist era from 1946 to 1989 while only 28.1% said they would prefer to live in the post-1989 era. More than 9.5% of Bulgarians wanted to live during the tsardom era.

==== Czech Republic ====
In a 2009 Pew survey, 39% of Czechs said life was worse nowadays economically compared to the Warsaw Pact era, while 45% said it was better.

In a 1991 survey, 15% of Czechs said the current regime was "much worse" or "a little worse" compared to the past communist regime, and 71% of Czechs said the current regime was "much better" or "a little better" compared to the past communist regimes. Later in a 2021 survey, 25% of Czechs said the current regime was "much worse" or "a little worse" compared to the past communist regime, and 59% of Czechs said the current regime was "much better" or "a little better" compared to the past communist regime.

==== East Germany ====
According to surveys by the Allensbach Institute, while East Germans initially had a common German identity, by 1993, a majority of East Germans said they consider themselves "former citizens of East Germany" rather than part of a united Germany. Only 11% of East Germans considered themselves as having a common German identity.

In a 2009 survey, 49% of East Germans believed that "The GDR had more good sides than bad sides. There were some problems, but life was good there", while 8% believed that "The GDR had, for the most part, good sides. Life there was happier and better than in reunified Germany today", combining to a total of 57%.

In 2023, a poll found that 40% of Germans living in the former East Germany identify as East Germans rather than German, which 52% identified as.

==== Hungary ====
A 2010 Pew poll found that 72% of Hungarians said that most people in their country were worse off economically than they had been under communism. Only 8% said that most people in Hungary were better off, and 16% said that things were about the same. The poll also found that 42% disapproved of the move away from communism.

However, a 2019 Pew poll found that 70% of Hungarians approved of the shift to a market economy.

Polls indicate that nostalgia for the Communist János Kádár era remains widespread in Hungary. According to a 2020 poll carried out by Policy Solutions in Hungary, 54 percent of Hungarians believe most people had a better life under Kádár, compared to 31 percent who say life for most people was worse under Kádár.

==== Poland ====
A 2009 Pew survey found that 35% of Poles believed life was worse economically nowadays, with 47% of Poles saying life was better economically nowadays, compared to the Warsaw Pact era.

==== Romania ====
A 2014 poll found that 44% of the respondents believed that living conditions had been better under communism. A 2010 poll conducted by the Romanian Institute for Evaluation and Strategy provided similar results. Of the 1,460 respondents, 54% claimed that they had experienced better living standards during communism, while 16% said that they had been worse.

According to opinion poll held in 2010, 41% of Romanians would have voted for Communist Nicolae Ceaușescu if given the opportunity and 63% felt their lives were better before 1989. In 2012, a survey showed that 53% of Romanians said they would return to communism and that Ceausescu's regime was badly applied.

In 2014, the percentage of those who would vote for Ceaușescu reached 46%. On 27 December 2018, a poll found 64% of people had a good opinion of him.

==== Slovakia ====
A 2009 Pew survey showed that 48% of Slovaks said life was economically worse nowadays compared to the Warsaw Pact era. A 2018 poll in Slovakia found that 81% agreed that people helped each other more during communism, were more sympathetic and closer to each other. 79% asserted that people lived in a safer environment during socialism and that violent crimes were less frequent. Another 77% claimed that thanks to the planned economy, there was enough useful work for all and therefore no unemployment. However, the poll also noted that "Most of the respondents did not want to return to the communist-time economy and preferred a market or social market economy, but in the answers to specific questions they favoured a greater role of the state, with guarantees and social certainties".

In a 1991 survey, 35% of Slovaks said the current regime was "much worse" or "a little worse" compared to the past communist regime, and 43% of Slovaks said the current regime was "much better" or "a little better" compared to the past communist regimes. Later in a 2021 survey, 40% of Slovaks said the current regime was "much worse" or "a little worse" compared to the past communist regime, and 45% of Slovaks said the current regime was "much better" or "a little better" compared to the past communist regime.

However, a 2019 Pew poll found that 71% of Slovakians approved of the shift to a market economy.

=== Yugoslavia ===
==== Bosnia and Herzegovina ====
In a 2016 Gallup survey, 77% of Bosnians said the breakup of Yugoslavia was harmful, compared to 6% who said it was beneficial.

==== Croatia ====
In a 2015 survey of Croatians above 45 from the magazine Moje Vrijeme, 74% said they could live in a one-party state and 83% said they did not experience discrimination during the Yugoslav era. 88% said job security was valued more, 78% said public health was valued more, 72% said friendship and economic security was valued more, 71% said said solidarity was valued more, and 67% said the elderly were respected more during the socialist era. 39% say the position of women has worsened, 34% say it's stayed the same, and 21% say women have more opportunities today compared to the Yugoslav era. Only 2% say LGBT rights were valued more and 12% say freedom of speech was valued more. 69% say corruption has worsened with only 2% saying corruption had gotten better. 67% said that it was easier to find a job without any "connection", 26% said it was easy but one would need a "connection", and only 1% said it is easier to find a job now. 71% say it was easier to go on vacation to the "South" and 55% said they generally could afford more. 91% said children are less safe today while only 1% said they are more safe with 73% favoring the return of youth work actions. Only 8% said Josip Broz Tito was a dictator with 40% saying he was generally a positive figure.

In a 2016 Gallup survey, 23% of Croatians said the breakup of Yugoslavia was harmful, compared to 55% who said it was beneficial.

==== Montenegro ====
In a 2016 Gallup survey, 65% of Montenegrins said the breakup of Yugoslavia was harmful, compared to 15% who said it was beneficial.

==== North Macedonia ====
In a 2016 Gallup survey, 12% of Macedonians said the breakup of Yugoslavia was beneficial, compared to 61% who said it was harmful.

==== Kosovo ====
In a 2016 Gallup survey, 10% of Kosovans said the breakup of Yugoslavia was harmful, compared to 75% who said it was beneficial.

==== Serbia ====
In a 2016 Gallup survey, 81% of Serbs said the breakup of Yugoslavia was harmful, compared to 4% who said it was beneficial.

==== Slovenia ====
In a 2014 Gallup survey, 45% of Slovenians said the breakup of Yugoslavia was harmful, compared to 41% who said it was beneficial.

=== Albania ===
A 2016 OSCE survey showed that 42% of Albanians said that communist leader Enver Hoxha had a positive impact, compared to 45% who said he had a negative impact. 35% of Albanians do not view the communist past of Albania as problematic, while 62% view it as at least somewhat problematic.

== Outside Europe and the former USSR ==
=== Yemen ===
According to journalist Bilal Zenab Ahmed, nostalgia remains strong in parts of southern Yemen for the People's Democratic Republic of Yemen (South Yemen). Ahmed compared communist nostalgia in the former South Yemen to communist nostalgia in the former Soviet Union, noting its emphasis on cultural memory and ongoing impact on modern day nationalism. Ahmed asserted that nostalgia for the perceived stability, social benefits, and low unemployment of South Yemen have played a strong role in support for modern-day South Yemeni separatism. The Southern Movement in particular drew much of its initial support from elements of the southern Yemeni population nostalgic for the former Marxist government, and communist nostalgia features subtly in much of its messaging, propaganda, and symbolism.

Political scholar Anne-Linda Amira Augustin asserted that communist nostalgia in Yemen is primarily driven by nostalgia for state-sponsored social benefits, namely free healthcare, an educational system with relatively high standards, low unemployment, and provision of social security. Augustin found in her research that communist nostalgia has experienced a resurgence among younger Yemenis born since 1990 who cannot remember the South Yemeni government, but are disillusioned with the social and political conditions since the country's unification.

== See also ==
- Postsocialism
- Post-communism
