= Winter ice cream =

Hungarian confectionary

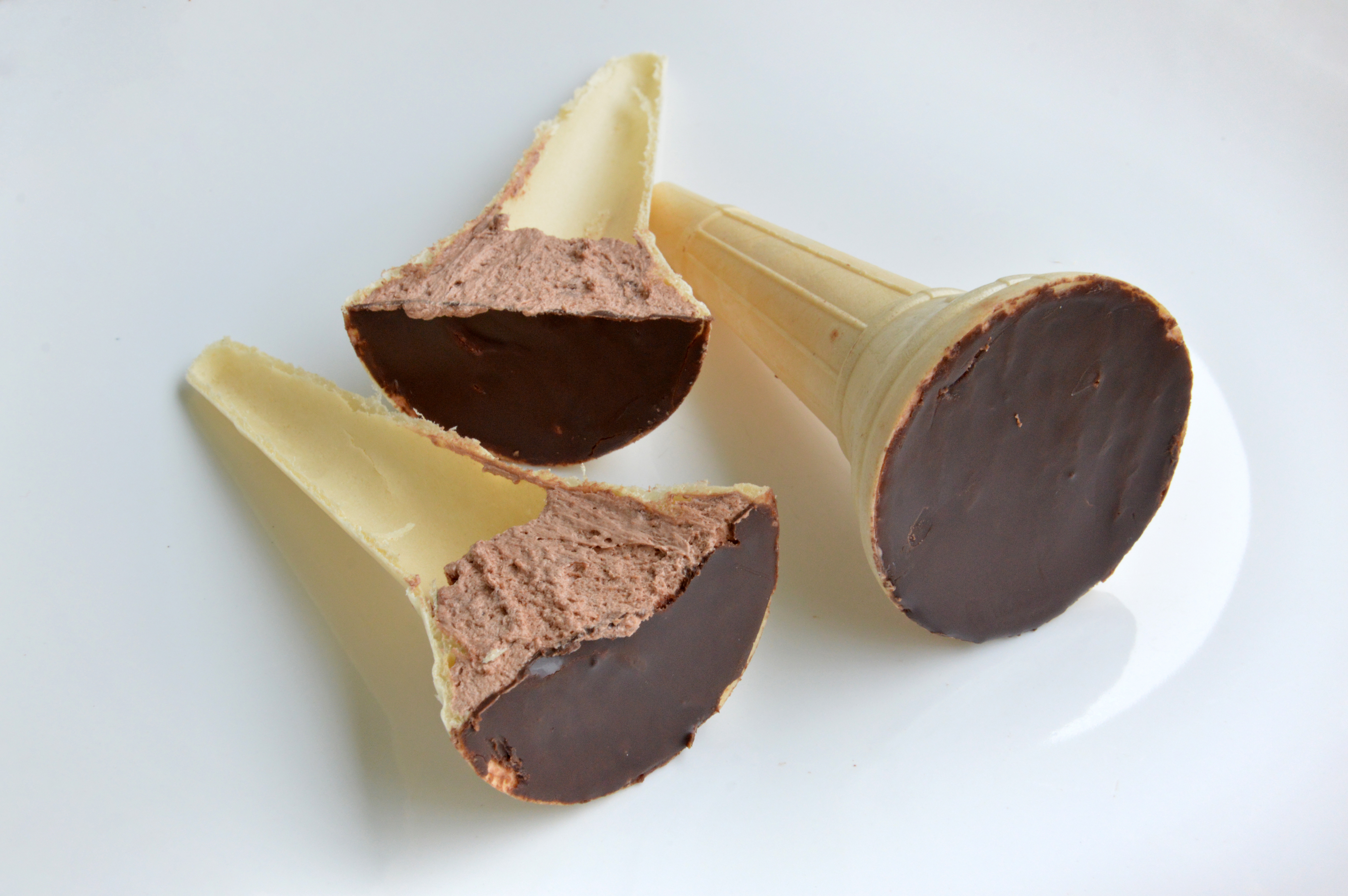
- Intact and bisected winter ice cream cones, showing a poorly filled, cheap variation
- Type: Confectionery
- Course: Snack
- Place of origin: Hungary
- Associated cuisine: Hungarian cuisine
- Invented: 1970s
- Serving temperature: at room temperature or cooled
- Main ingredients: wafer, ganache or buttercream, dark chocolate or compound chocolate
- Variations: multiple cream flavorings
- Food energy (per one 30 g serving): 160 kcal (670 kJ)
Nutritional value
(per one 30 g serving)
- Protein: 1.1 g
- Fat: 10.4 g
- Carbohydrate: 15.4 g
- Other information: Above nutritional values are based on the cheaper, mass-produced variations with buttercream and compound chocolate.

Winter ice cream (Hungarian: téli fagylalt [ˈteːli ˈfɒɟlɒlt] or téli fagyi [ˈteːli ˈfɒɟi]) is a Hungarian confectionery similar in appearance to ice cream in a cone, but traditionally having ganache or a similar kind of sweet cream filling with usually a chocolate-cocoa flavoring. It gained popularity in the 1970s in communist Hungary, being produced as a winter alternative to "summer" ice creams, which were deemed to be too cold for winter sweets. Apart from grocery shops, it was frequently sold as part of the national railway's catering service (utasellátó). The confectionery's popularity faded in the early 1990s, when, after the end of communism, foreign candy manufacturers and their products appeared on the Hungarian market. However, along with some other snack foods and soft drinks of communist-era Hungary, winter ice cream garnered renewed interest in the late 2000s and 2010s.

== Description ==
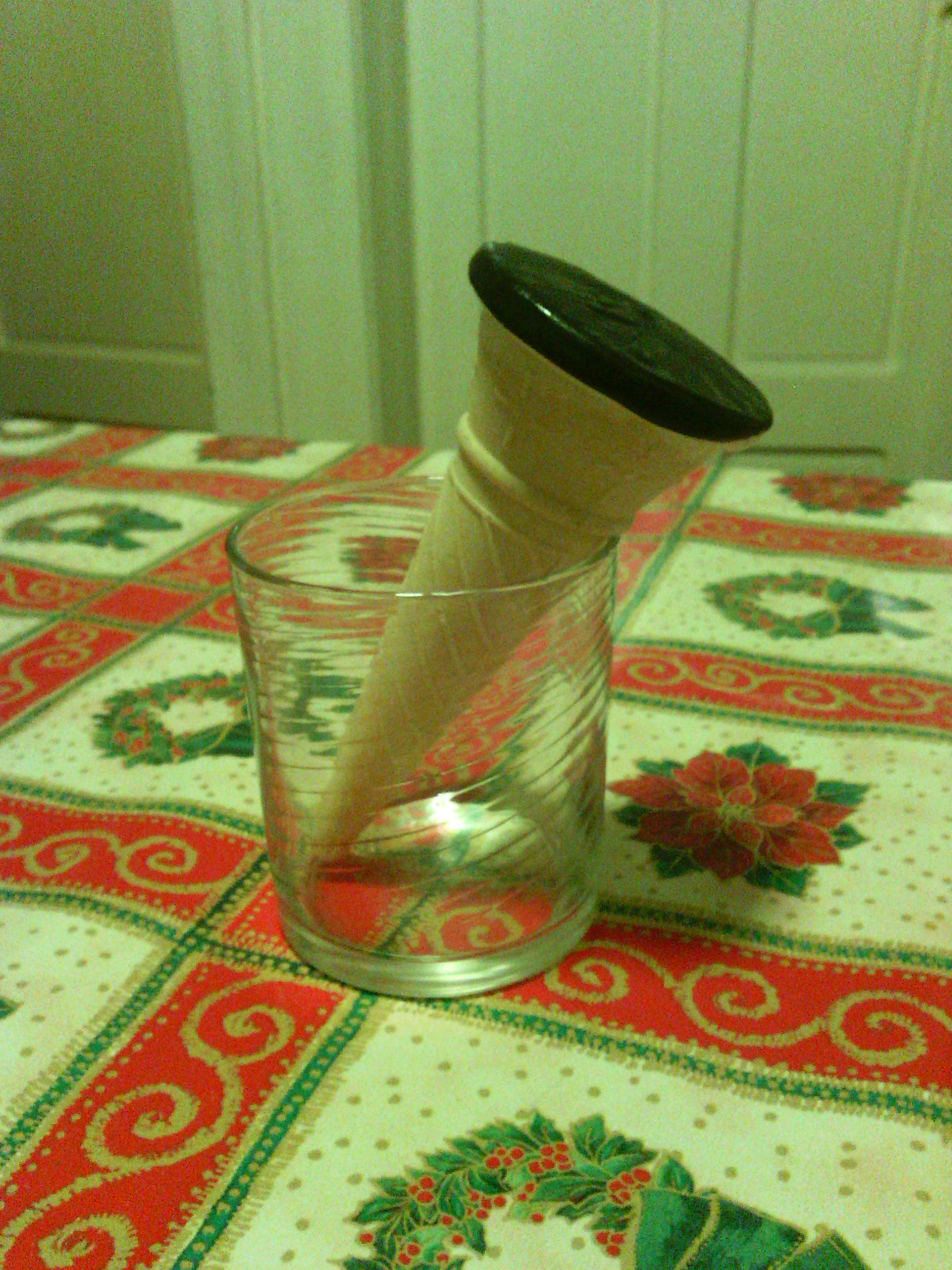
Winter ice cream in a glass, with flat top visible

Winter ice cream usually consists of a wafer cone with ganache filling in it, with dark chocolate coating being on the flat top of the filling. Cheaper formulations may use cocoa-flavored buttercream instead of ganache for filling and compound chocolate instead of dark chocolate for coating. The confectionery was originally mass-produced to be sold in shops, but it is now also available in pâtisseries, and it can be made at home with various novelty flavorings. Traditionally, the available flavorings were cocoa (kakaós), vanilla (vaníliás), lemon (citromos) and coconut (kókuszos).

The mass-produced variants do not require refrigeration while still having a relatively long shelf life (around 2–4 months). Originally weighing around 40 g or more, modern mass-produced winter ice creams are around 20–30 g for a half-empty cone, and 50–60 g for a full cone.

== See also ==
- Warm ice cream
- Túró Rudi
- Summer pudding
- Iced bun
