= Why Women Have Better Sex Under Socialism =

2018 book by Kristen Ghodsee

Why Women Have Better Sex Under Socialism: And Other Arguments for Economic Independence
- Author: Kristen Ghodsee
- Language: English
- Genre: Politics, Sexuality
- Publisher: Vintage Books
- Publication date: 2018
- Publication place: United States
- ISBN: 978-1529110579

Why Women Have Better Sex Under Socialism. And Other Arguments for Economic Independence is a 2018 book by American anthropologist Kristen Ghodsee and published by Vintage Books.

In the book, Ghodsee argues that social safety nets create a fairer and better society for women. She argues that under unregulated free markets, the primary burden of parenting, elder-care and care for the sick falls on women who end up providing the labor for free. She uses case studies drawn from Eastern Europe to illustrate her argument. She rejects a return to 20th-century state socialism, arguing instead that some of the social safety nets found in Eastern Europe, as well as Scandinavia and Western Europe, would improve the lives of women.

== Publication ==
Why Women Have Better Sex Under Socialism: And Other Arguments for Economic Independence is a 2018 book by anthropologist Kristen Ghodsee, and published by Vintage Books. Ghodsee is a professor of Russian and East European Studies at the University of Pennsylvania. The book has also been translated into multiple foreign languages, including Spanish, French, German, Portuguese, Dutch, Russian, Polish, Czech, Slovak, Indonesian, Thai, Korean and Japanese.

== Synopsis ==
In the book, Ghodsee argues that socialist societies are better for women. She presents the reader with a view of motherhood from an economic and political perspective. She is critical of the sexualised images that frequently appear in western magazines and television, which she describes as capitalism commodifying women. She presents a series of case studies from Eastern Europe and claims that compared to capitalist societies, women are more liberated and have more control of their lives in socialist societies. She points out how women tend to earn less than men in capitalist societies, thus making women more dependent on men and receiving more pressure to get married.

Two chapters of the book are about sexual economics, and are critical of puritanical tendencies in western societies while praising what she contends is the normalisation of sex in socialist societies. The book quotes studies purporting to show greater sexual satisfaction among women in East Germany compared to those in West Germany.

Ghodsee advocates for a Universal Basic Income which she argues would balance inequity resulting from unpaid labour that women undertake.

== Critical reception ==
Rebecca Mead, writing in The New Yorker, described the book as "smart" and "accessible", praising its illustration of how different economic and social structures can shape people's relationships to sex, health and economic independence. She considered the book a useful argument that adopting some socialist policies could materially improve women's lives without requiring a return to the authoritarianism of former Eastern Bloc states.

Suzanne Moore, writing in The Guardian, called it a "joyous read."

Amber Edwards, writing in Philosophy Now, described the book as enjoyable, short, and snappy and credits Ghodsee for her nuance, and recognition of the flaws in every example she presents. Edwards also lamented the lack of intersectionality in the book.

== See also ==
- Do Communists Have Better Sex?, a 2006 German documentary
- Socialist feminism
- Marxist feminism
- Gender roles in post-communist Central and Eastern Europe
