= Nostalgia for the Polish People's Republic =

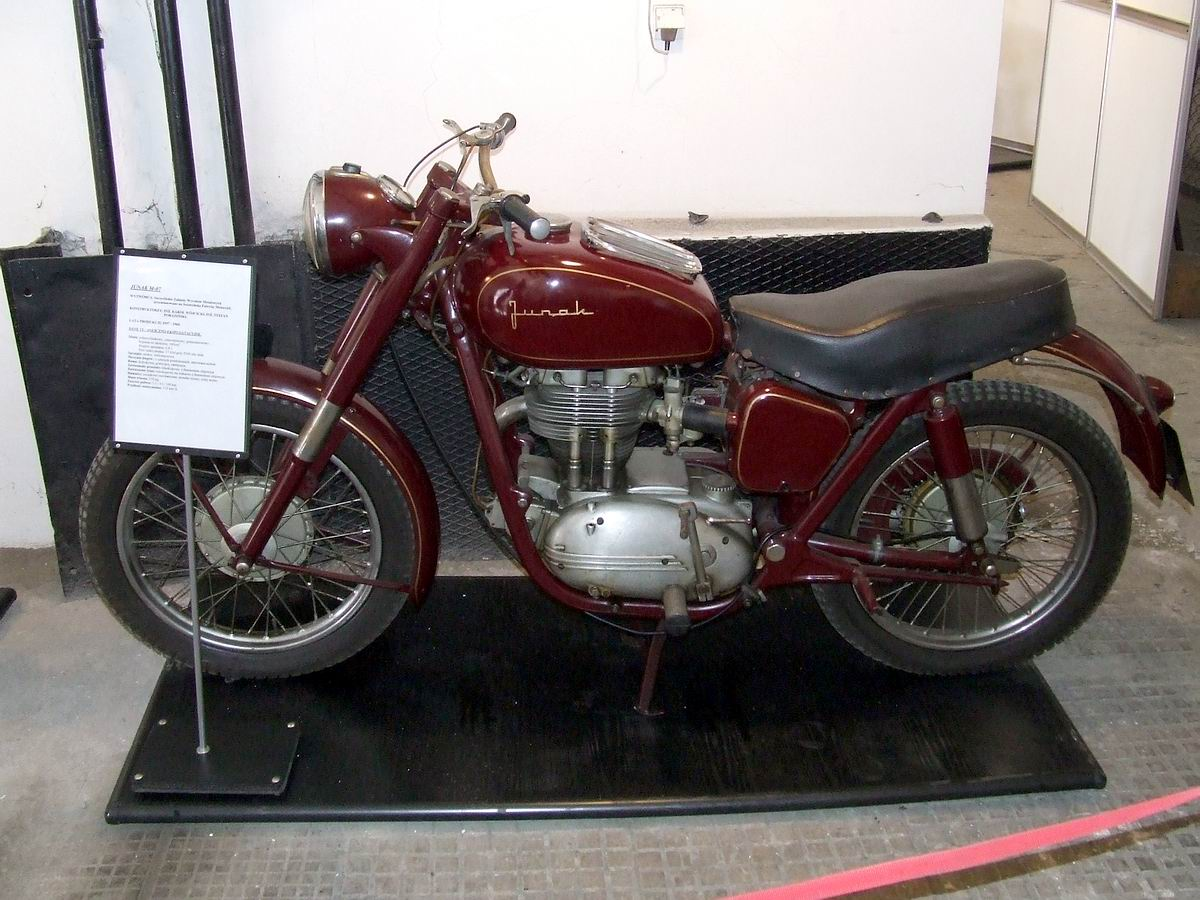
"Polish Harley Davidson", Junak bike, 1956–1965, also since 2010

In modern Polish culture there is nostalgia for some aspects of life in the Polish People's Republic (Polish: Polska Rzeczpospolita Ludowa, PRL), the communist period of the country's history between 1947 and 1989.

As with other manifestations of communist nostalgia, for people who lived during the period of the PRL, the two major factors that cause PRL nostalgia are a dissatisfaction with the present and memories of a happily recollected past.

Businesses were quick to respond to the phenomenon by renewing the manufacture of products from PRL times, such as Junak motorcycles, Ludwik laundry detergent, warm ice cream, zapiekanka sandwiches, Polo-Cockta cola, the soft drink podpiwek, and Grodziskie beer.

== See also ==
- Museum of the Polish People's Republic, Kraków
- Nostalgia for the Soviet Union
- Ostalgie – Nostalgia for aspects of life in East Germany
- Yugo-nostalgia – Nostalgia for Yugoslavia among ex-Yugoslav populations
