= Yugo-nostalgia =

Nostalgia for Yugoslavia among ex-Yugoslav populations

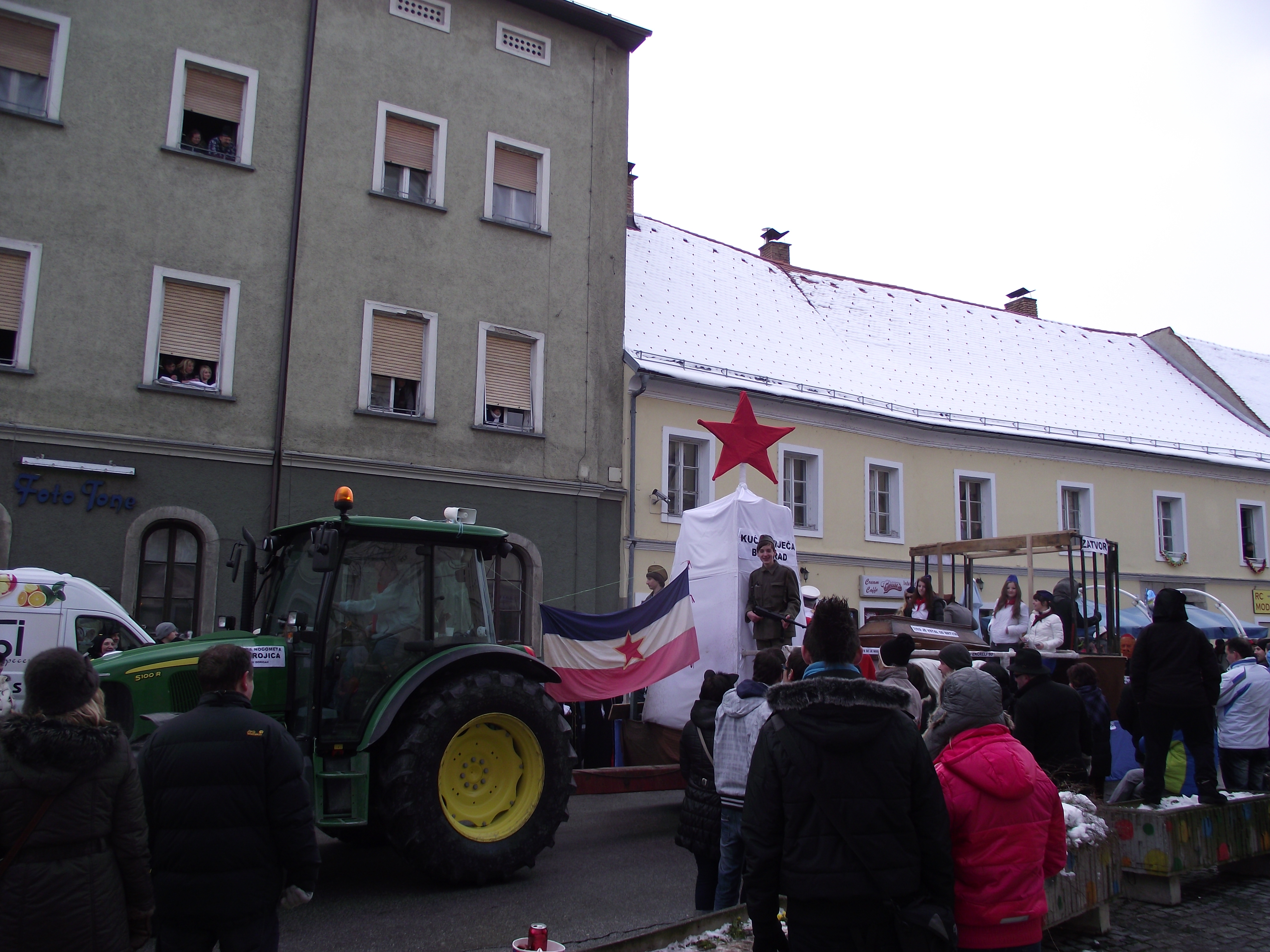
Yugoslav symbols during a carnival in Ptuj, Slovenia, in 2013

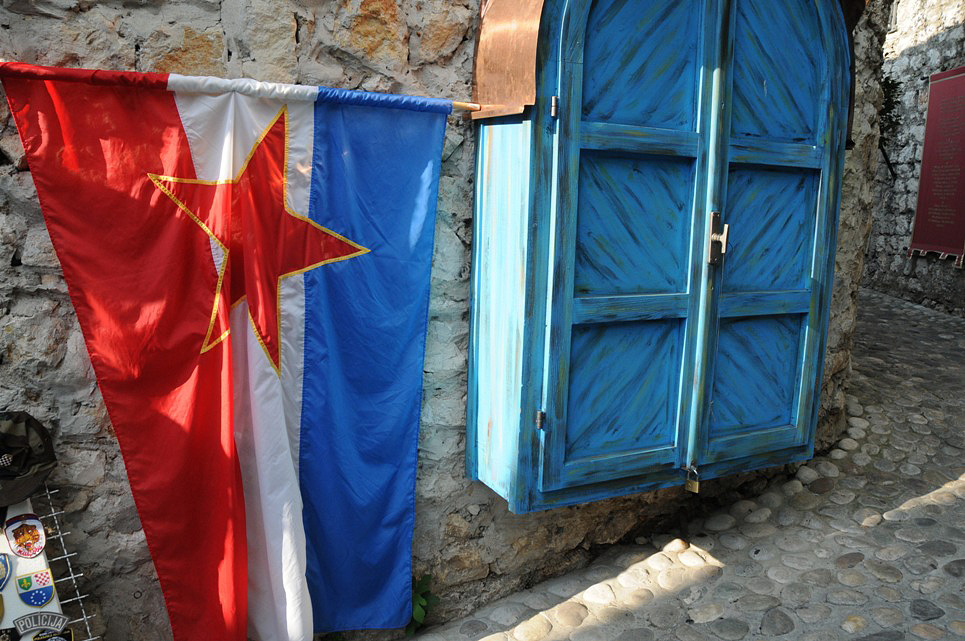
Yugoslav flag on a street in Mostar, Bosnia and Herzegovina, in 2009

Yugo-nostalgia (Slovene, Macedonian, and Serbo-Croatian: jugonostalgija, југоносталгија) is an emotional longing for the former country of Yugoslavia which is experienced by some people in its successor countries: the present-day Bosnia and Herzegovina, Croatia, Montenegro, North Macedonia, Serbia, Kosovo, and Slovenia. It is a political and cultural phenomenon that includes nostalgia for a time past when the splintered states were a part of one country, grief over the war that tore it apart, and a desire to again unite. Self-described Yugo-nostalgics may express grief at the failure of brotherly love, unity, and coexistence, and distress that division and nationalism prevailed, or they may assert that their quality of life was better in Yugoslavia.

While its anthropological and sociological aspects have not been extensively studied, it can also be used negatively and ethnocentrically to denigrate someone usually of the same ethnic background who expresses sympathy or statement of support for any aspect of Yugoslavia, instead of the prevailing post-Yugoslav successor state they belong to.

Present cultural and economic manifestations of Yugo-nostalgia include music groups with Yugoslav or Titoist retro iconography, art works, films, theater performances, and many organized, themed tours of the main cities of the former Yugoslav republics. The notion of Yugo-nostalgia should not be confused with Yugoslavism, which is the ideology behind the unity of South Slavic nations. The concepts have some overlap but Yugo-nostalgia celebrates the pre-1991 period whereas Yugoslavism and Yugoslav reunification (as a branch of pan-Slavism) are an ongoing mindset just as likely to appeal to persons born after the breakup of Yugoslavia that feel their national interests may be best served by unification.

== Polling history ==
According to a Gallup poll from 2017, 81% of Serbs think that the breakup of Yugoslavia harmed their country, while 77% of Bosnians and Herzegovinians, 65% of Montenegrins, and 61% of Macedonians agree. Only 4% of Serbs think that the break-up of Yugoslavia was beneficial for their country, while just 6% of Bosniaks and 15% of Montenegrins feel positive about the split. In Croatia, 55% of respondents saw the break-up as beneficial and just 23% as harmful. In Slovenia, 41% see the break-up as beneficial while 45% think it was harmful. The highest number of respondents who welcomed the break-up of Yugoslavia were in Kosovo, which declared independence in 2008, where 75% said the split was beneficial and only 10% regretted it.

== Positive sense ==
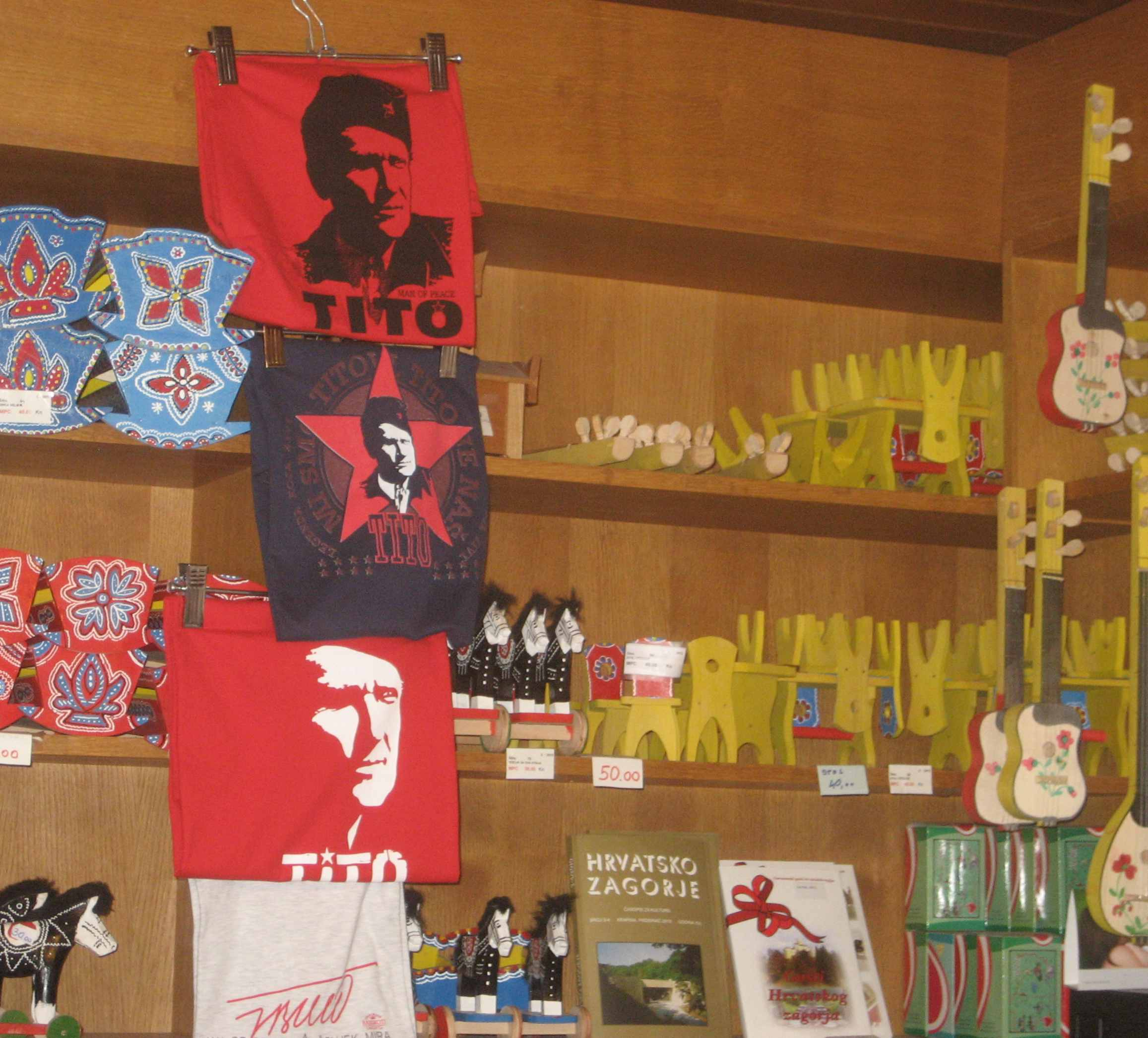
T-shirts on sale in Tito's birthplace of Kumrovec, Croatia, 2012

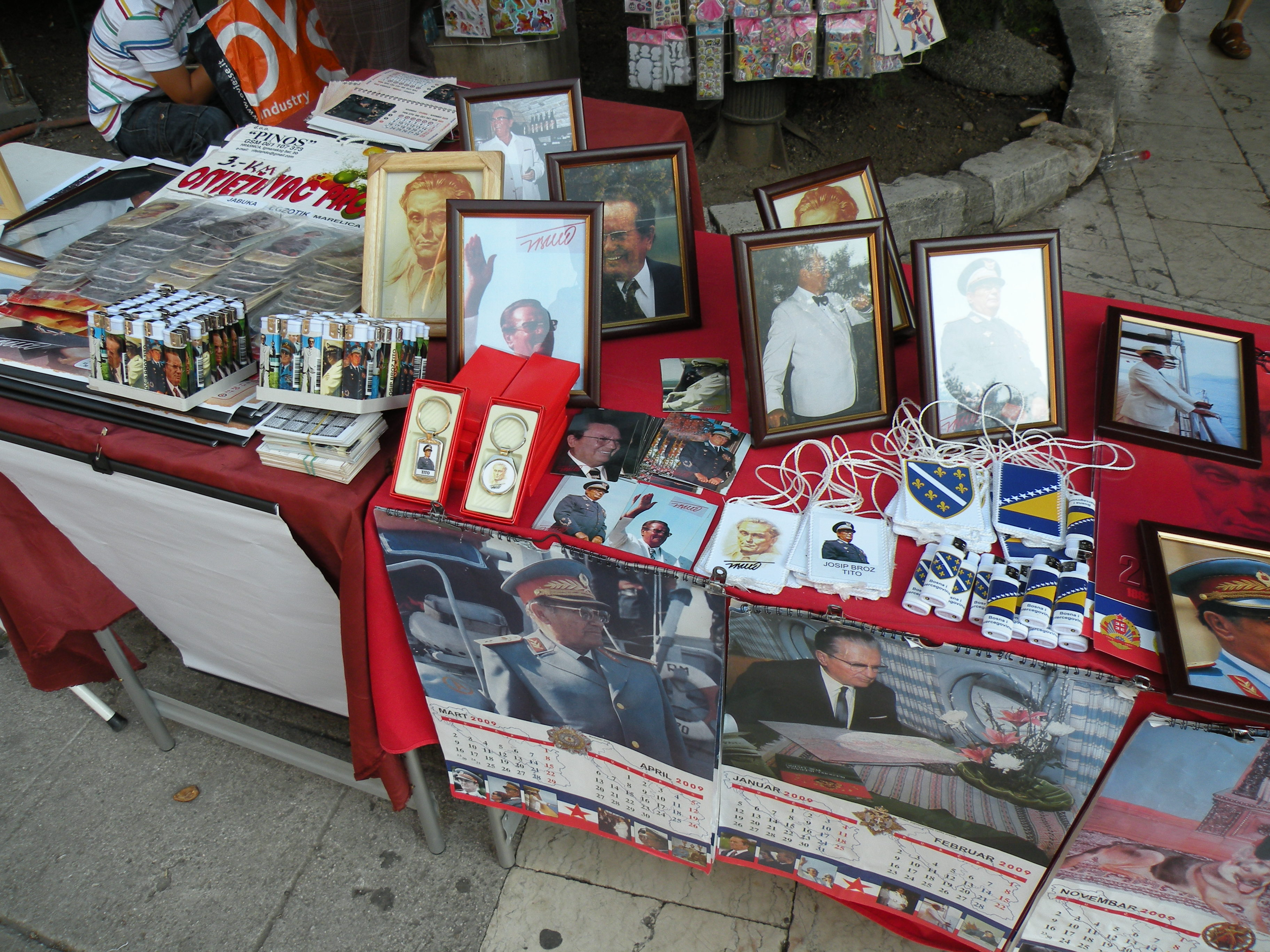
Tito memorabilia in an outdoor market in Sarajevo, Bosnia and Herzegovina, 2009

In its positive sense, Yugo-nostalgia refers to a nostalgic emotional attachment to both subjective and objectively desirable aspects of the SFR Yugoslavia. These are described as one or more of: economic security, sense of solidarity, socialist ideology, multiculturalism, internationalism and non-alignment, history, customs and traditions, and a more rewarding way of life. As Halligan argues, such nostalgia effectively "reclaims" pre-1989 cultural artefacts, even propaganda films. Examples include consumer goods and brands.

These positive facets, however, are opposed to the perceived faults of the successor countries, many of which are still burdened by the consequences of the Yugoslav wars and are in various stages of economic and political transition. The faults are variously identified as parochialism, jingoism, corruption in politics and business, the disappearance of the social safety net, economic hardship, income inequities, and higher crime rates, as well as a general disarray in administrative and other state institutions.

== Negative sense ==
In the negative sense, the epithet has been used by the supporters of the new post-dissolution regimes to portray their critics as anachronistic, unrealistic, unpatriotic, and potential traitors. In particular, during and after the Yugoslav wars, the adjective has been used by state officials and media of some successor countries to deflect criticism and discredit certain avenues of political debate. In fact, it is likely that the term Yugo-nostalgic was originally coined precisely for this purpose, appearing as a politically motivated pejorative label in government-controlled media, for example in Croatia, very soon after the breakup of the SFRY.

According to Dubravka Ugrešić the term Yugo-nostalgic is used to discredit a person as a public enemy and a "traitor".

== Yugoslavism after Yugoslavia ==
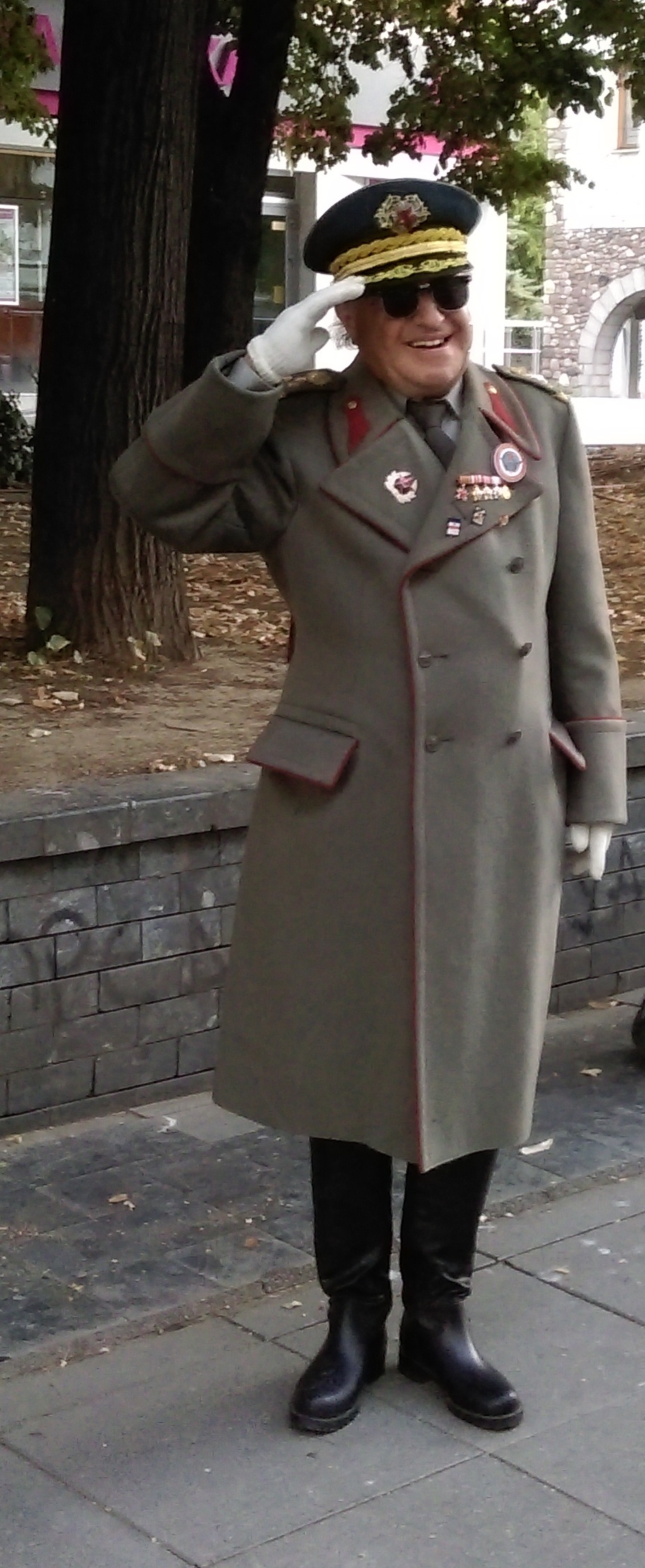
An impersonator of former president Josip Broz Tito in Skopje, Macedonia, in 2018

After the initial breakup of Yugoslavia at the beginning of the 1990s, Montenegro and Serbia continued a state union as the Federal Republic of Yugoslavia from April 1992 to February 2003, then simply as Serbia and Montenegro until its own dissolution in June 2006. The number of self-declared Yugoslavs (in the ethnic sense) in the region reached an all-time low after the breakup of Yugoslavia. The former country's lingua franca, Serbo-Croatian, is no longer the official language of any of the former state's constituent republics. There are few works published about the language, and it no longer has a standardizing body. The .yu Internet domain name, which was popular among Yugo-nostalgic websites, was phased out in 2010.

However, by the start of the 2010s an increasing number of Slovenes were experiencing Yugo-nostalgia. In Subotica, Vojvodina (the northern province of Serbia), one man set up Yugoland, a theme park dedicated to Tito and Yugoslavia. People from all over the former Yugoslavia travel great distances to celebrate the legacy of the late country. On Yugoslavia's Youth Day, a day traditionally known as Tito's birthday, popular gathering places for Yugo-nostalgics include Kumrovec, the small village in Croatian Zagorje where Tito was born, and his resting place at the House of Flowers. These sites attract several thousand visitors each year.

In Croatia, the "Alliance of Yugoslavs" (Savez Jugoslavena) was established in 2010 in Zagreb, an association aiming to unite the Yugoslavs of Croatia, regardless of religion, gender, political or other views. Its main goal is the official recognition of the Yugoslav nation in every Yugoslav successor state: Bosnia and Herzegovina, Croatia, Kosovo, North Macedonia, Montenegro, Serbia, and Slovenia.

Another organization advocating Yugoslavism is the "Our Yugoslavia" association (Udruženje "Naša Jugoslavija") founded on 30 July 2009, seated in Pula, which is an officially registered organization in Croatia. The association has most members in the towns of Rijeka, Zagreb, and Pula. Its main aim is the stabilisation of relations among the Yugoslav successor states. It is also active in Bosnia and Herzegovina, however, its official registration as an association was denied by the Bosnian state authorities.

The probably best-known Yugoslavist organization in Montenegro is the "Consulate-general of the SFRY" with its headquarters in the coastal town of Tivat. Prior to the population census of 2011, Marko Perković, the president of this organization called on the Yugoslavs of Montenegro to freely declare their Yugoslav identity on the upcoming census.

Yugo-nostalgia retains a stronghold among former Yugoslav populations who emigrated the country before its breakup, most prominently in the United States, Canada, and Australia. They have been described as 'de-patriated': "scattered all over the world, without a homeland" or "a hope of returning home someday".

== Yugoslav reunification ==
Map of SFR Yugoslavia

Yugoslav reunification, the idea of reunifying some or all of the former republics, has grassroots appeal across the former territory. However, its proponents are resigned to the notion that such a state is not likely to come into fruition since the successor regimes have firmly cemented their commitment to an independent existence, having established their institutions and chosen their respective directions.

== See also ==
- Balkanization
- Communist nostalgia, similar in different places
  - Nostalgia for the Polish People's Republic
  - Ostalgie – Nostalgia for aspects of life in East Germany
  - Nostalgia for the Soviet Union – Post-1991 social phenomenon
- Serbian–Montenegrin unionism
- Yugoslav studies

== Bibliography ==
- Halligan, Benjamin: "Idylls of Socialism: The Sarajevo Documentary School and the Problem of the Bosnian Sub-proletariat". In Studies in Eastern European Cinema (Autumn 2010). (https://salford-repository.worktribe.com/output/1457653/idylls-of-socialism-the-sarajevo-documentary-school-and-the-problem-of-the-bosnian-sub-proletariat)
- Breda Luthar; Maruša Pušnik (2010). Remembering Utopia: The Culture of Everyday Life in Socialist Yugoslavia. New Academia Publishing, LLC. ISBN 978-0-9844062-3-4.
- Trovesi, Andrea: L'enciclopedia della Jugonostalgija. In Banchelli, Eva: Taste the East: Linguaggi e forme dell'Ostalgie, Sestante Edizioni, Bergamo 2006, ISBN 88-87445-92-3, p. .
- Djokić, Dejan (2003). Yugoslavism: Histories of a Failed Idea, 1918-1992. C. Hurst & Co. Publishers. ISBN 978-1-85065-663-0.
- Volcic, Zala, "Yugo-Nostalgia: Cultural Memory and Media in the Former Yugoslavia," Critical Studies in Media Communication, Volume 24, Number 1, March 2007: 257-274
- Kristen R. Ghodsee, "Red Nostalgia? Communism, Women's Emancipation, and Economic Transformation in Bulgaria."
- Bošković, Aleksandar (2013). "Yugonostalgia and Yugoslav Cultural Memory: Lexicon of Yu Mythology". Slavic Review. 72 (1): 54–78. doi:10.5612/slavicreview.72.1.0054. S2CID 164995701.

Region	until 1918	1918– 1929	1929– 1945	1941– 1945	1945– 1946	1946– 1963	1963– 1992	1992– 2003	2003– 2006	2006– 2008	since 2008
Slovenia	Part of Austria-Hungary including the Bay of Kotor See also: Kingdom of Croatia-Slavonia (1868–1918) Kingdom of Dalmatia (1815–1918) Condominium of Bosnia and Herzegovina (1878–1918)	State of Slovenes, Croats and Serbs (1918) Kingdom of Serbs, Croats and Slovenes (1918–1929) Kingdom of Yugoslavia (1929–1943) See also: Republic of Prekmurje (1919) Banat, Bačka and Baranja (1918–1919) Free State of Fiume (1920–1924) (1924–1945) Italian province of Zadar (1920–1947)		Annexed by Italy, Germany, and Hungary^{a}	Democratic Federal Yugoslavia (1943–1945) Federal People's Republic of Yugoslavia (1945–1963) Socialist Federal Republic of Yugoslavia (1963–1992) Consisted of the Socialist Republics of: Slovenia (1945–1991); Croatia (1945–1991); Bosnia and Herzegovina (1945–1992) Serbia (1945–1992) (included the autonomous provinces of Vojvodina and Kosovo) Montenegro (1945–1992); Macedonia (1945–1991) See also: Free Territory of Trieste (1947–1954)^{h}			Republic of Slovenia; Ten-Day War			
Dalmatia	Part of Austria-Hungary including the Bay of Kotor See also: Kingdom of Croatia-Slavonia (1868–1918) Kingdom of Dalmatia (1815–1918) Condominium of Bosnia and Herzegovina (1878–1918)	State of Slovenes, Croats and Serbs (1918) Kingdom of Serbs, Croats and Slovenes (1918–1929) Kingdom of Yugoslavia (1929–1943) See also: Republic of Prekmurje (1919) Banat, Bačka and Baranja (1918–1919) Free State of Fiume (1920–1924) (1924–1945) Italian province of Zadar (1920–1947)		Independent State of Croatia (1941–1945) Puppet state of Germany. Parts annexed by Italy. Međimurje and Baranja annexed by Hungary.	Democratic Federal Yugoslavia (1943–1945) Federal People's Republic of Yugoslavia (1945–1963) Socialist Federal Republic of Yugoslavia (1963–1992) Consisted of the Socialist Republics of: Slovenia (1945–1991); Croatia (1945–1991); Bosnia and Herzegovina (1945–1992) Serbia (1945–1992) (included the autonomous provinces of Vojvodina and Kosovo) Montenegro (1945–1992); Macedonia (1945–1991) See also: Free Territory of Trieste (1947–1954)^{h}			Republic of Croatia^{b} Croatian War of Independence			
Slavonia	Part of Austria-Hungary including the Bay of Kotor See also: Kingdom of Croatia-Slavonia (1868–1918) Kingdom of Dalmatia (1815–1918) Condominium of Bosnia and Herzegovina (1878–1918)	State of Slovenes, Croats and Serbs (1918) Kingdom of Serbs, Croats and Slovenes (1918–1929) Kingdom of Yugoslavia (1929–1943) See also: Republic of Prekmurje (1919) Banat, Bačka and Baranja (1918–1919) Free State of Fiume (1920–1924) (1924–1945) Italian province of Zadar (1920–1947)		Independent State of Croatia (1941–1945) Puppet state of Germany. Parts annexed by Italy. Međimurje and Baranja annexed by Hungary.	Democratic Federal Yugoslavia (1943–1945) Federal People's Republic of Yugoslavia (1945–1963) Socialist Federal Republic of Yugoslavia (1963–1992) Consisted of the Socialist Republics of: Slovenia (1945–1991); Croatia (1945–1991); Bosnia and Herzegovina (1945–1992) Serbia (1945–1992) (included the autonomous provinces of Vojvodina and Kosovo) Montenegro (1945–1992); Macedonia (1945–1991) See also: Free Territory of Trieste (1947–1954)^{h}			Republic of Croatia^{b} Croatian War of Independence			
Croatia	Part of Austria-Hungary including the Bay of Kotor See also: Kingdom of Croatia-Slavonia (1868–1918) Kingdom of Dalmatia (1815–1918) Condominium of Bosnia and Herzegovina (1878–1918)	State of Slovenes, Croats and Serbs (1918) Kingdom of Serbs, Croats and Slovenes (1918–1929) Kingdom of Yugoslavia (1929–1943) See also: Republic of Prekmurje (1919) Banat, Bačka and Baranja (1918–1919) Free State of Fiume (1920–1924) (1924–1945) Italian province of Zadar (1920–1947)		Independent State of Croatia (1941–1945) Puppet state of Germany. Parts annexed by Italy. Međimurje and Baranja annexed by Hungary.	Democratic Federal Yugoslavia (1943–1945) Federal People's Republic of Yugoslavia (1945–1963) Socialist Federal Republic of Yugoslavia (1963–1992) Consisted of the Socialist Republics of: Slovenia (1945–1991); Croatia (1945–1991); Bosnia and Herzegovina (1945–1992) Serbia (1945–1992) (included the autonomous provinces of Vojvodina and Kosovo) Montenegro (1945–1992); Macedonia (1945–1991) See also: Free Territory of Trieste (1947–1954)^{h}			Republic of Croatia^{b} Croatian War of Independence			
Bosnia	Part of Austria-Hungary including the Bay of Kotor See also: Kingdom of Croatia-Slavonia (1868–1918) Kingdom of Dalmatia (1815–1918) Condominium of Bosnia and Herzegovina (1878–1918)	State of Slovenes, Croats and Serbs (1918) Kingdom of Serbs, Croats and Slovenes (1918–1929) Kingdom of Yugoslavia (1929–1943) See also: Republic of Prekmurje (1919) Banat, Bačka and Baranja (1918–1919) Free State of Fiume (1920–1924) (1924–1945) Italian province of Zadar (1920–1947)		Independent State of Croatia (1941–1945) Puppet state of Germany. Parts annexed by Italy. Međimurje and Baranja annexed by Hungary.	Democratic Federal Yugoslavia (1943–1945) Federal People's Republic of Yugoslavia (1945–1963) Socialist Federal Republic of Yugoslavia (1963–1992) Consisted of the Socialist Republics of: Slovenia (1945–1991); Croatia (1945–1991); Bosnia and Herzegovina (1945–1992) Serbia (1945–1992) (included the autonomous provinces of Vojvodina and Kosovo) Montenegro (1945–1992); Macedonia (1945–1991) See also: Free Territory of Trieste (1947–1954)^{h}			Bosnia and Herzegovina^{c} Bosnian War Consists of the Federation of Bosnia and Herzegovina (since 1995), Republika Srpska (since 1995), and Brčko District (since 2000).			
Herzegovina	Part of Austria-Hungary including the Bay of Kotor See also: Kingdom of Croatia-Slavonia (1868–1918) Kingdom of Dalmatia (1815–1918) Condominium of Bosnia and Herzegovina (1878–1918)	State of Slovenes, Croats and Serbs (1918) Kingdom of Serbs, Croats and Slovenes (1918–1929) Kingdom of Yugoslavia (1929–1943) See also: Republic of Prekmurje (1919) Banat, Bačka and Baranja (1918–1919) Free State of Fiume (1920–1924) (1924–1945) Italian province of Zadar (1920–1947)		Independent State of Croatia (1941–1945) Puppet state of Germany. Parts annexed by Italy. Međimurje and Baranja annexed by Hungary.	Democratic Federal Yugoslavia (1943–1945) Federal People's Republic of Yugoslavia (1945–1963) Socialist Federal Republic of Yugoslavia (1963–1992) Consisted of the Socialist Republics of: Slovenia (1945–1991); Croatia (1945–1991); Bosnia and Herzegovina (1945–1992) Serbia (1945–1992) (included the autonomous provinces of Vojvodina and Kosovo) Montenegro (1945–1992); Macedonia (1945–1991) See also: Free Territory of Trieste (1947–1954)^{h}			Bosnia and Herzegovina^{c} Bosnian War Consists of the Federation of Bosnia and Herzegovina (since 1995), Republika Srpska (since 1995), and Brčko District (since 2000).			
Vojvodina	Part of the Délvidék region of Hungary	State of Slovenes, Croats and Serbs (1918) Kingdom of Serbs, Croats and Slovenes (1918–1929) Kingdom of Yugoslavia (1929–1943) See also: Republic of Prekmurje (1919) Banat, Bačka and Baranja (1918–1919) Free State of Fiume (1920–1924) (1924–1945) Italian province of Zadar (1920–1947)		Autonomous Banat^{d} (part of the German; Territory of the Military Commander in Serbia)	Democratic Federal Yugoslavia (1943–1945) Federal People's Republic of Yugoslavia (1945–1963) Socialist Federal Republic of Yugoslavia (1963–1992) Consisted of the Socialist Republics of: Slovenia (1945–1991); Croatia (1945–1991); Bosnia and Herzegovina (1945–1992) Serbia (1945–1992) (included the autonomous provinces of Vojvodina and Kosovo) Montenegro (1945–1992); Macedonia (1945–1991) See also: Free Territory of Trieste (1947–1954)^{h}			Federal Republic of Yugoslavia Consisted of the Republic of Serbia (1992–2006) and Republic of Montenegro (1992–2006) Included Kosovo and Metohija, under UN administration, without control since 1999	State Union of Serbia and Montenegro Included Kosovo, under UN administration	Republic of Serbia Included the autonomous provinces of Vojvodina and Kosovo and Metohija under UN administration	Republic of Serbia Includes the autonomous province of Vojvodina; Kosovo claim
Central Serbia	Kingdom of Serbia (1882–1918)	State of Slovenes, Croats and Serbs (1918) Kingdom of Serbs, Croats and Slovenes (1918–1929) Kingdom of Yugoslavia (1929–1943) See also: Republic of Prekmurje (1919) Banat, Bačka and Baranja (1918–1919) Free State of Fiume (1920–1924) (1924–1945) Italian province of Zadar (1920–1947)		Territory of the Military Commander in Serbia (1941–1944) ^{e}	Democratic Federal Yugoslavia (1943–1945) Federal People's Republic of Yugoslavia (1945–1963) Socialist Federal Republic of Yugoslavia (1963–1992) Consisted of the Socialist Republics of: Slovenia (1945–1991); Croatia (1945–1991); Bosnia and Herzegovina (1945–1992) Serbia (1945–1992) (included the autonomous provinces of Vojvodina and Kosovo) Montenegro (1945–1992); Macedonia (1945–1991) See also: Free Territory of Trieste (1947–1954)^{h}			Federal Republic of Yugoslavia Consisted of the Republic of Serbia (1992–2006) and Republic of Montenegro (1992–2006) Included Kosovo and Metohija, under UN administration, without control since 1999	State Union of Serbia and Montenegro Included Kosovo, under UN administration	Republic of Serbia Included the autonomous provinces of Vojvodina and Kosovo and Metohija under UN administration	Republic of Serbia Includes the autonomous province of Vojvodina; Kosovo claim
Kosovo	Part of the Kingdom of Serbia (1912–1918)	State of Slovenes, Croats and Serbs (1918) Kingdom of Serbs, Croats and Slovenes (1918–1929) Kingdom of Yugoslavia (1929–1943) See also: Republic of Prekmurje (1919) Banat, Bačka and Baranja (1918–1919) Free State of Fiume (1920–1924) (1924–1945) Italian province of Zadar (1920–1947)		Mostly annexed by Italian Albania (1941–1944) along with western Macedonia and south-eastern Montenegro	Democratic Federal Yugoslavia (1943–1945) Federal People's Republic of Yugoslavia (1945–1963) Socialist Federal Republic of Yugoslavia (1963–1992) Consisted of the Socialist Republics of: Slovenia (1945–1991); Croatia (1945–1991); Bosnia and Herzegovina (1945–1992) Serbia (1945–1992) (included the autonomous provinces of Vojvodina and Kosovo) Montenegro (1945–1992); Macedonia (1945–1991) See also: Free Territory of Trieste (1947–1954)^{h}			Federal Republic of Yugoslavia Consisted of the Republic of Serbia (1992–2006) and Republic of Montenegro (1992–2006) Included Kosovo and Metohija, under UN administration, without control since 1999	State Union of Serbia and Montenegro Included Kosovo, under UN administration	Republic of Serbia Included the autonomous provinces of Vojvodina and Kosovo and Metohija under UN administration	Republic of Kosovo
Metohija	Kingdom of Montenegro (1910–1918) Metohija controlled by Austria-Hungary 1915–1918	State of Slovenes, Croats and Serbs (1918) Kingdom of Serbs, Croats and Slovenes (1918–1929) Kingdom of Yugoslavia (1929–1943) See also: Republic of Prekmurje (1919) Banat, Bačka and Baranja (1918–1919) Free State of Fiume (1920–1924) (1924–1945) Italian province of Zadar (1920–1947)		Mostly annexed by Italian Albania (1941–1944) along with western Macedonia and south-eastern Montenegro	Democratic Federal Yugoslavia (1943–1945) Federal People's Republic of Yugoslavia (1945–1963) Socialist Federal Republic of Yugoslavia (1963–1992) Consisted of the Socialist Republics of: Slovenia (1945–1991); Croatia (1945–1991); Bosnia and Herzegovina (1945–1992) Serbia (1945–1992) (included the autonomous provinces of Vojvodina and Kosovo) Montenegro (1945–1992); Macedonia (1945–1991) See also: Free Territory of Trieste (1947–1954)^{h}			Federal Republic of Yugoslavia Consisted of the Republic of Serbia (1992–2006) and Republic of Montenegro (1992–2006) Included Kosovo and Metohija, under UN administration, without control since 1999	State Union of Serbia and Montenegro Included Kosovo, under UN administration	Republic of Serbia Included the autonomous provinces of Vojvodina and Kosovo and Metohija under UN administration	Republic of Kosovo
Montenegro and Brda	Kingdom of Montenegro (1910–1918) Metohija controlled by Austria-Hungary 1915–1918	State of Slovenes, Croats and Serbs (1918) Kingdom of Serbs, Croats and Slovenes (1918–1929) Kingdom of Yugoslavia (1929–1943) See also: Republic of Prekmurje (1919) Banat, Bačka and Baranja (1918–1919) Free State of Fiume (1920–1924) (1924–1945) Italian province of Zadar (1920–1947)		Protectorate of Montenegro^{f} (1941–1944)	Democratic Federal Yugoslavia (1943–1945) Federal People's Republic of Yugoslavia (1945–1963) Socialist Federal Republic of Yugoslavia (1963–1992) Consisted of the Socialist Republics of: Slovenia (1945–1991); Croatia (1945–1991); Bosnia and Herzegovina (1945–1992) Serbia (1945–1992) (included the autonomous provinces of Vojvodina and Kosovo) Montenegro (1945–1992); Macedonia (1945–1991) See also: Free Territory of Trieste (1947–1954)^{h}			Federal Republic of Yugoslavia Consisted of the Republic of Serbia (1992–2006) and Republic of Montenegro (1992–2006) Included Kosovo and Metohija, under UN administration, without control since 1999	State Union of Serbia and Montenegro Included Kosovo, under UN administration	Montenegro	
Vardar Macedonia	Part of the Kingdom of Serbia (1912–1918)	State of Slovenes, Croats and Serbs (1918) Kingdom of Serbs, Croats and Slovenes (1918–1929) Kingdom of Yugoslavia (1929–1943) See also: Republic of Prekmurje (1919) Banat, Bačka and Baranja (1918–1919) Free State of Fiume (1920–1924) (1924–1945) Italian province of Zadar (1920–1947)		Annexed by the Kingdom of Bulgaria (1941–1944)	Democratic Federal Yugoslavia (1943–1945) Federal People's Republic of Yugoslavia (1945–1963) Socialist Federal Republic of Yugoslavia (1963–1992) Consisted of the Socialist Republics of: Slovenia (1945–1991); Croatia (1945–1991); Bosnia and Herzegovina (1945–1992) Serbia (1945–1992) (included the autonomous provinces of Vojvodina and Kosovo) Montenegro (1945–1992); Macedonia (1945–1991) See also: Free Territory of Trieste (1947–1954)^{h}			Republic of North Macedonia^{g}			
^{a} Prekmurje annexed by Hungary.; ^{b} See also: SAO Kninska Krajina (1990) → SAO Krajina (1990–1991); and SAO Eastern Slavonia, Baranja and Western Syrmia (1990–1991), SAO Western Slavonia (1990–1991) and the Republic of Serbian Krajina (1990–1995), all replaced by the UN Transitional Administration for Eastern Slavonia, Baranja and Western Sirmium (1996–1998).; ^{c} See also: Republic of Bosnia and Herzegovina; Croatian Republic of Herzeg-Bosnia; and the Serbian Autonomous Oblasts (SAOs) of Bosanska Krajina, North-East Bosnia, Romanija and Herzegovina (1991–1992), which all combined to form the Serbian Republic of Bosnia and Herzegovina (1992–1995).; ^{d} Bačka was reannexed by Hungary (1941–1944), while Syrmia was annexed by the Independent State of Croatia (1941–1944).; ^{e} Including North Kosovo. See also: Republic of Užice.; ^{f} Annexed by Italy (1941–1943) and Germany (1943–1944). Smaller part annexed by the Independent State of Croatia (1941–1944).; ^{g} North Macedonia's official and constitutional name was the Republic of Macedonia until 2019. It was known in the United Nations as the former Yugoslav Republic of Macedonia because of a naming dispute with Greece.; ^{h} Free Territory was established in 1947. Its administration was divided into two areas (Zone A) and (Zone B). Free Territory was de facto taken over by Italy and SFRY in 1954.
