= Dominik Bartmanski =

Cultural sociologist and social theorist

- Born: Dominik Maksymilian Bartmanski; 27 November 1978 (age 47)

Academic background
- Education: University of Exeter; Yale University
- Thesis: How Icons Work (2011)

Academic work
- Discipline: Sociology
- Sub-discipline: Cultural sociology
- Institutions: Technische Universität Berlin
- Main interests: Material culture
- Notable works: Vinyl: The Analogue Record in the Digital Age (2015)

Dominik Maksymilian Bartmanski (born 1978) is a cultural sociologist and social theorist at Technische Universität Berlin. He is known for his work on consumption and material culture as well as icons and nostalgia which are all themes of his book with Ian Woodward, Vinyl: The Analogue Record in the Digital Age (2015).

== Early life and education ==
Dominik Bartmanski was born on 27 November 1978. He received his Master of Arts degree in sociology and European studies from the University of Exeter in 2005 and his Master of Philosophy degree in sociology from Yale University in 2007. In 2011 he received his Doctor of Philosophy degree with distinction in sociology from Yale University.

== Career ==
Bartmanski's first academic position was as a Lecturer in the Department of Sociology, TU Darmstadt from 2012. From 2012 to 2015 he was a European Social Fund Postdoctoral Fellow at Masaryk University and for 2014 to 2015 a Visiting Lecturer at Bard College Berlin. Since 2015 he has been a Research Associate in the Sociology Department at DFG-Projekt, TU Berlin. His research relates to material culture, urban sociology, and the sociology of consumption, knowledge, and music.

His book with Ian Woodward, Vinyl: The Analogue Record in the Digital Age (2015), received positive reviews for its treatment of the resurgence of the vinyl record as a recording medium from the point of view of material culture and the sociology of consumption. Nabeel Zuberi in the journal of the International Association for the Study of Popular Music praised the authors for the throughness of their research, saying "Vinyl is a vital work to spin, mix and play off more textualist feminist scholarship and critical race studies on phonographic culture" but felt that the authors could have given more attention to the economic aspects of the vinyl resurgence and noted that most of the interviewees were white European men. Likewise, Paul Winters' review in Popular Music and Society found the book's greatest weakness to be its "focus on urban, independent, and electronic users", a focus that necessarily leaves much of "the story of the vinyl revival untold". Anne-Kathrin Hoklas in Information, Communication & Society notes Bartmanski and Woodward's argument that the vinyl revival is not purely nostalgic and that it has occurred not despite digitization but partly because of it. She praised the book for "providing a refreshing perspective on contemporary vinyl culture informed by cultural sociology and material culture studies". Robin Bartram in Qualitative Sociology praised the authors for the "meticulous detail" with which they investigated their subject. Writing in the Association for Recorded Sound Collections annual journal, Edward Komara commended the authors for being "sturdy academics who know exactly when to leave the discussion of the musical aspects to the musicologists".

The book's discussion of the physical manifestations of recorded media relates to Bartmanski's work on icons about which he had co-edited and authored a book in 2012 titled Iconic Power: Materiality and Meaning in Social Life and his work on the nostalgic power of the physical symbols of superseded forms such as the vinyl record or the former communist regimes of eastern Europe as evidenced in the streetscapes of Berlin and Warsaw.

His book Labels: Making Independent Music with Ian Woodward is set to be published by Bloomsbury Academic in 2019.

== Selected publications ==
- Iconic Power: Materiality and Meaning in Social Life. Palgrave Macmillan, 2012. (Co-editor)
- "Being and Knowledge: On Some Liabilities of Reed's Interpretivism". Czech Sociological Review No. 3: 499-511. (With W. Binder)
- "Refashioning Sociological Imagination: Linguality, Visuality and the Iconic Turn in Cultural Sociology". Chinese Journal of Sociology 1(1): 136-161.
- "The Vinyl. The Analogue Medium in the Age of Digital Reproduction". Journal of Consumer Culture 15(1): 3-27 (online 2013). (With I. Woodward)
- Vinyl: The Analogue Record in the Digital Age. Bloomsbury, London, 2014. (With Ian Woodward)
- "Modes of Seeing: Analysis Interpretation and Criticism after the Iconic Turn in Social Sciences". Sociologica No. 1/2015.
