= Polo Cockta =

Polish cola drink

Polo-Cockta
- Type: Soft drink
- Manufacturer: Zbyszko (2000s)
- Origin: Poland, based on Slovenian Cockta
- Introduced: 1970s; 2000s
- Discontinued: 1980s
- Flavour: cola
- Related products: Coca-Cola, Pepsi, Kofola, Cockta
- Website: https://zbyszko.com.pl/category/polo-cockta/

Polo-Cockta (sometimes written as Polo Cockta or Polo-Cocta) is a Polish cola drink introduced in the 1970s. Polo-Cockta was introduced as a substitute for the original Coca-Cola, which was unavailable in Polish shops due to limits on exports from the U.S. to Soviet Bloc countries. At first it was based on Cockta, a very popular drink from Slovenia (then SFR Yugoslavia).

Polo-Cockta was discontinued during the 1980s, but was revived for a few years by Zbyszko. The private company acquired all the rights to the brand, reacting to the popular demand for PRL-stylised products, an element of "PRL nostalgia". The taste of Polo-Cockta is sometimes described as a mixture of Coca-Cola and Pepsi.

For a period, Polo-Cockta was renamed Polo Cola, without change to the product itself. However, in 2016, Polo Cola was renamed back to Polo-Cockta.

Polo-Cockta made a significant appearance in the Polish film Kingsajz by Juliusz Machulski, where it was a major plot device.
