= Ostalgie =

Nostalgia for aspects of life in East Germany

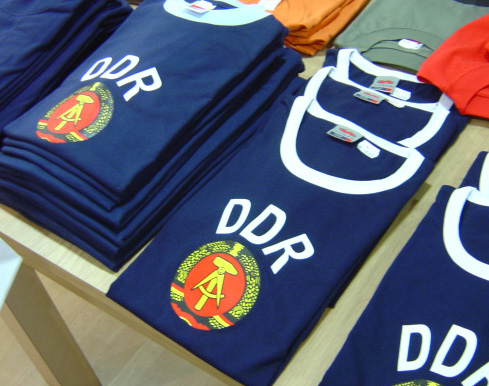
GDR T-shirts, for sale in Berlin in 2004

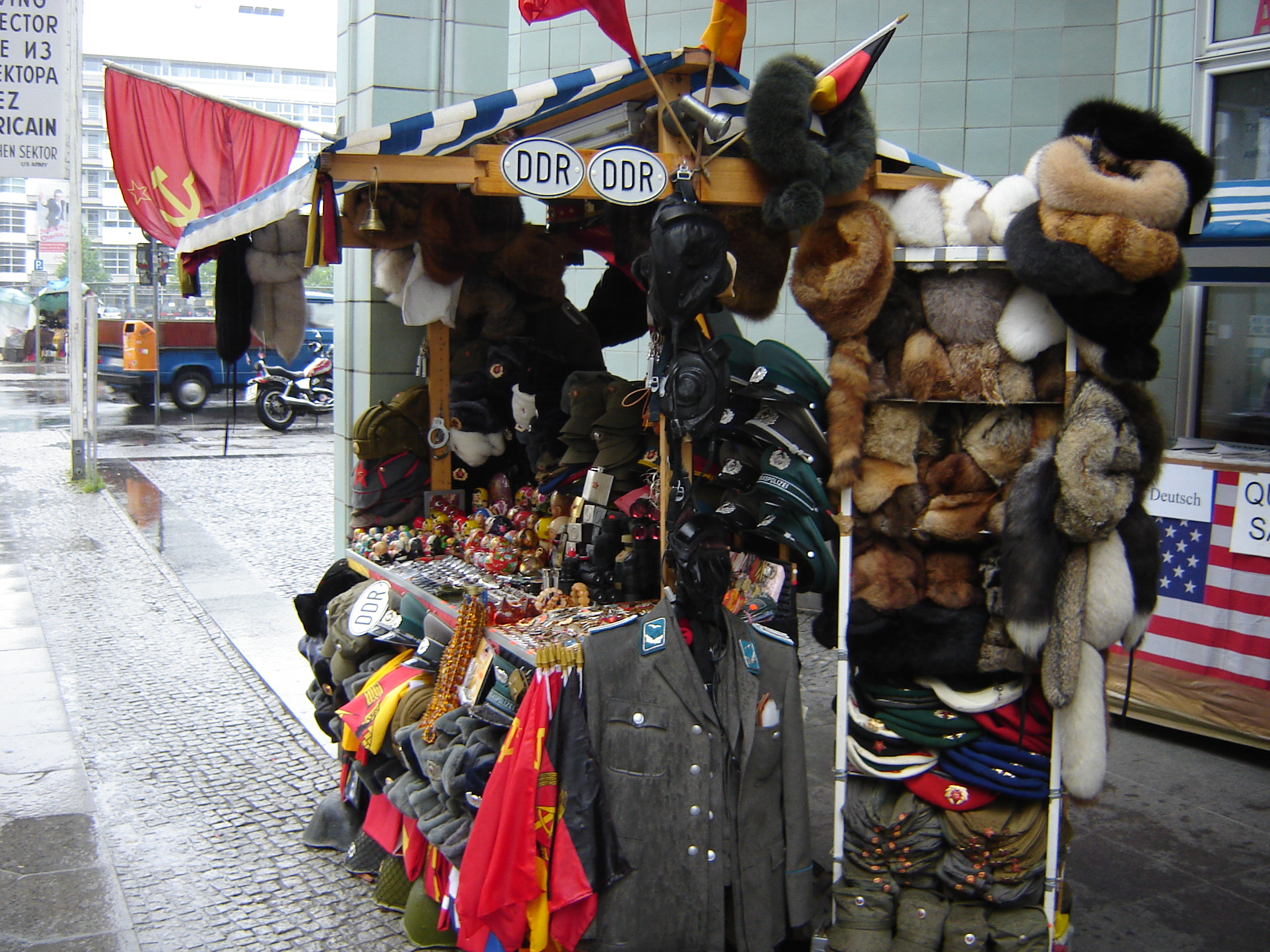
Soviet and GDR Memorabilia for sale in Berlin in 2006

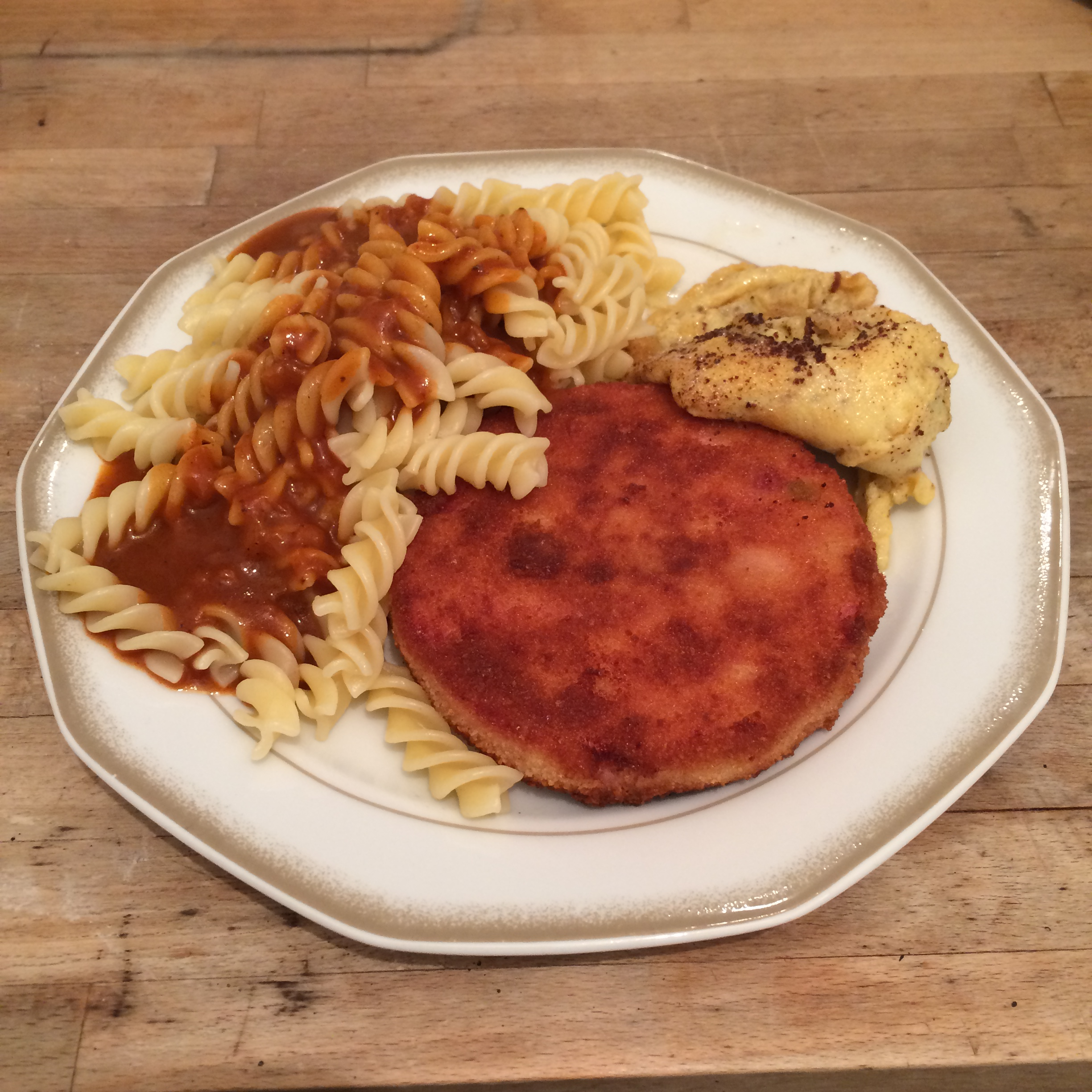
Jägerschnitzel, a popular East German cuisine item

In German culture, Ostalgie (German: [ˌʔɔstalˈɡiː]) is nostalgia for aspects of life in communist East Germany. It is a portmanteau of the German words Ost (east) and Nostalgie (nostalgia). Its anglicised equivalent, ostalgia (rhyming with "nostalgia"), is also sometimes used. Another term for the phenomenon is GDR nostalgia (German: DDR-Nostalgie).

The term was coined by the East German standup comic Uwe Steimle in 1992. Social scientist Thomas Ahbe argues that the term "ostalgia" is often misunderstood as a lack of willingness to integrate, an attempt to reverse German reunification and reinstate the GDR. However, Ostalgia is rather an integration strategy used by East Germans who wanted to retain their own original experiences, memories and values incompatible with those of the West German majority.

As with other cases of Communist nostalgia, there are various motivations, whether ideology, nationalism, wistfulness for a lost sense of social status or stability, or even aesthetics or irony.

In 2023, a poll found that 40% of Germans living in the former East Germany still identified as East Germans, while 52% considered themselves to be Germans.

== History ==
Ostalgie is a complex term that should not be described as a simple emotion of nostalgia. As Ostalgie relates back to the history of the Cold War, it is better to examine this term in the context of history and current influence in Western society; in doing so, the meaning of this term becomes clearer.

The division of Germany into East and West for over 40 years engendered the formation of distinct identities between the two regions. Despite their shared language and history, the capitalist FRG and socialist GDR differed in many obvious political, economic and cultural respects; thus, their respective societies cultivated cultural identities distinct to each region. These pre-existing differences were then exposed during and after the reunification process.

== Effects ==
After the fall of the Berlin Wall in 1989 and the following German reunification a year later, many of the symbols of the German Democratic Republic were swept away. The process of unification gave rise to feelings of resentment and nostalgia amongst former GDR citizens. They felt short-changed by a unification process which they equated to a colonial takeover. One particular focus of Ostalgie centred around unemployment. Officially, unemployment had not existed in the GDR, but this employment security disappeared with reunification and unemployment became endemic at around 20% of the workforce. The social security provided by the workplace in the GDR was a great focus of Ostalgia. Kolinsky presents reunification as characterised by Easterners' disaffection. The mass experience of unemployment emerged as a key tenet of a re-forged East German identity based on the collective experience of employment-loss and the perceived economic destruction of their region. Subsequently, many constructed a retrospective image of the GDR as a stable and caring environment. Unification was felt to have been to their disadvantage and to have isolated them as second-class citizens.

Reunification presented a particular challenge to women. This was particularly true for working women who had enjoyed organised healthcare and equal pay in the GDR and who faced the greatest unemployment post-Wende. Approximately 70% of East German women lost their job after 1990. Women were laid off faster than men, as well as suffering the consequences of the collapse of state-run childcare facilities and traditional ideals of female domesticity and consumerism were reinvoked, having been challenged by the state in the GDR.

Ostalgie was also felt for commodities of the GDR. Almost all GDR brands of products disappeared from the stores and were replaced by Western products. However, after some time many Eastern Germans began to miss certain aspects of their former lives (like culture or the known brand marks). Ostalgie particularly refers to the nostalgia for aspects of regular daily life and culture in the former GDR, which disappeared after reunification.

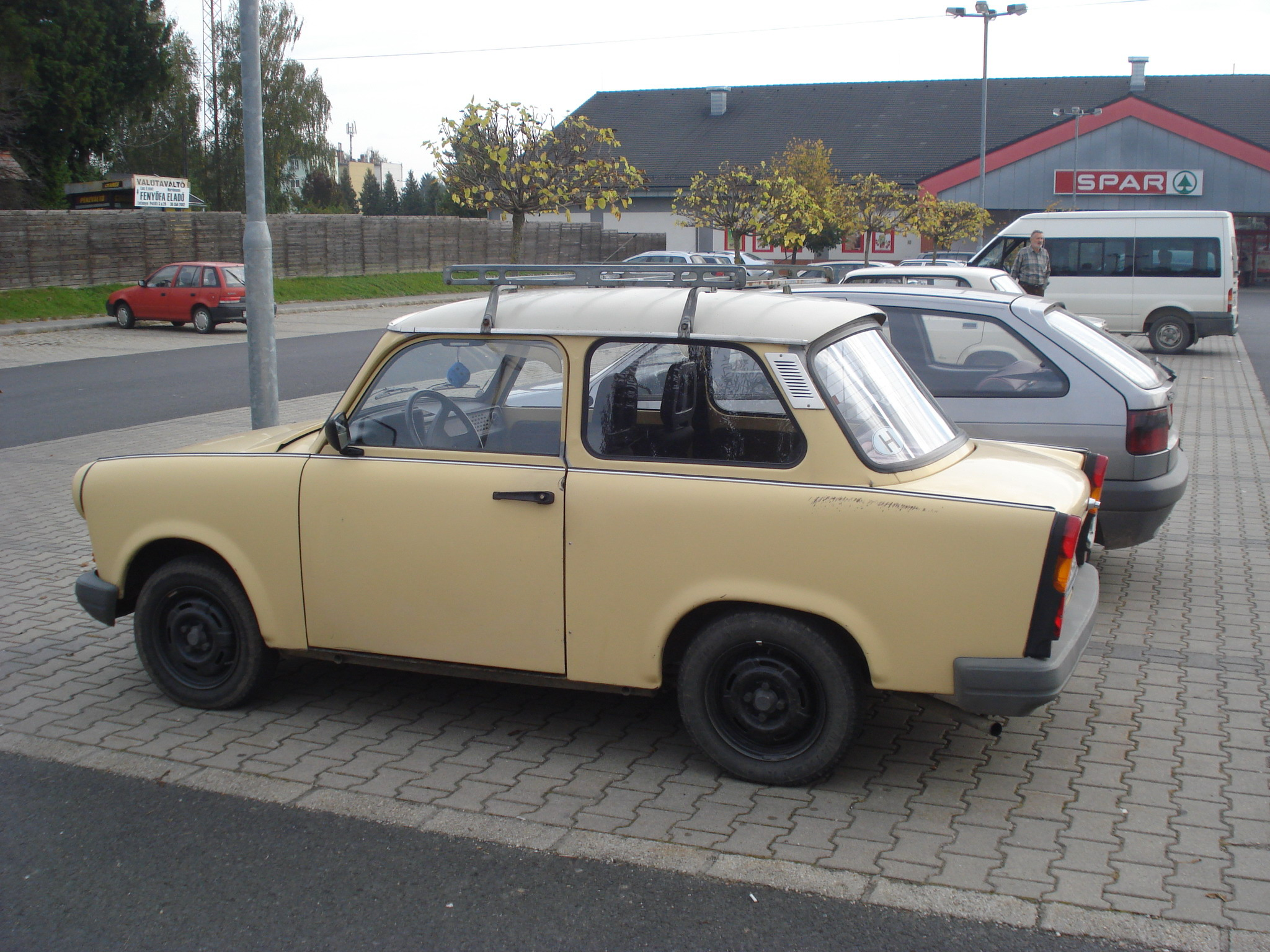
East German Trabant car at a car park in Hungary, May 2015

== Commercialisation ==
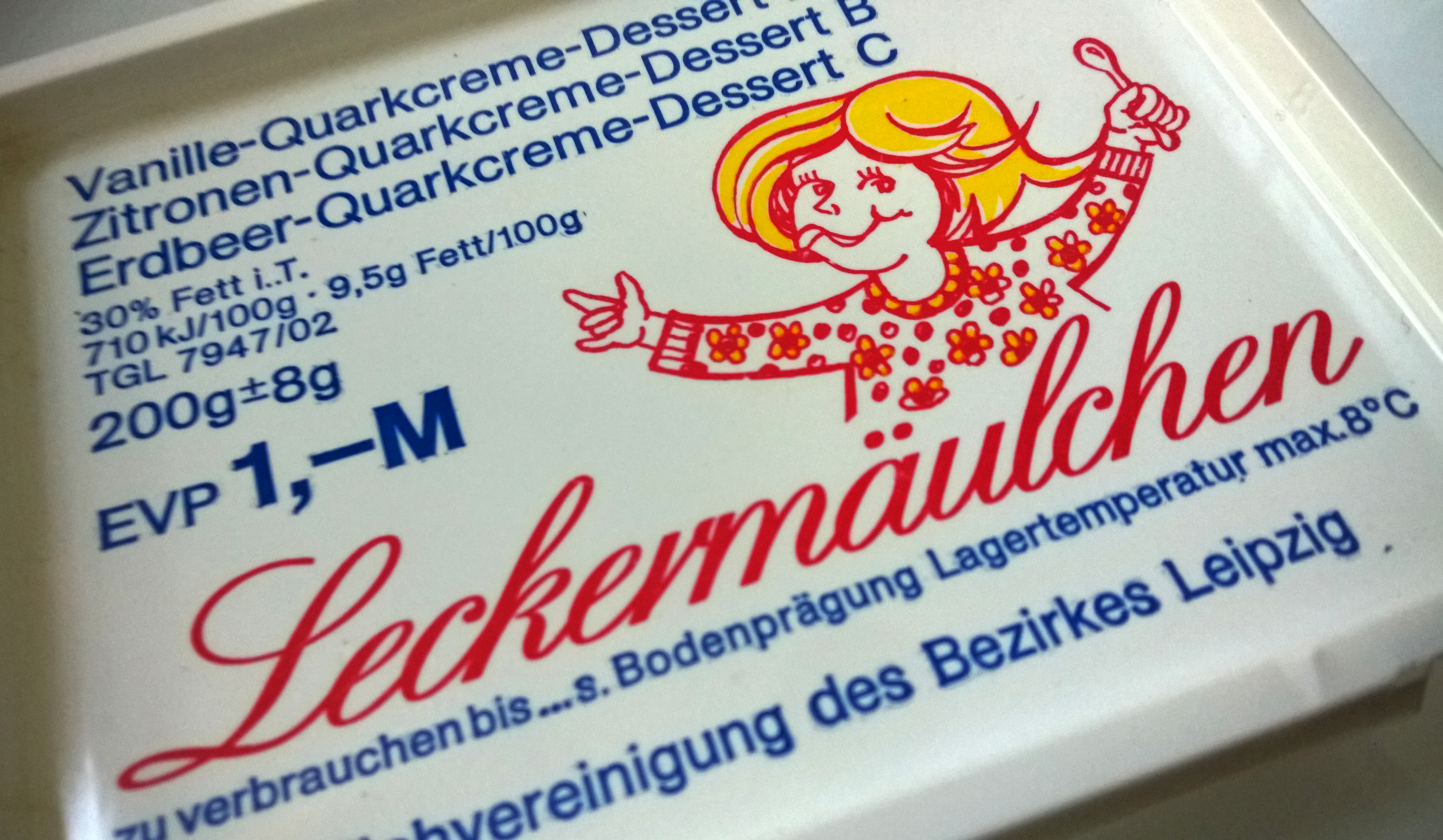
Leckermäulchen ("sweet tooth"), an East German dairy curd treat, from Leipzig

Ostalgie is expressed in present day Germany through commodities and products reminiscent of the East-German era.

Recently a commercial market catering to those who feel Ostalgie has emerged in Germany. It is centered around providing artifacts, both originals and reproductions, that remind of life under the GDR. Some examples are brands of East German food, old state television programmes on video tape and DVD, and the once widespread Wartburg and Trabant cars.

== Popular culture ==
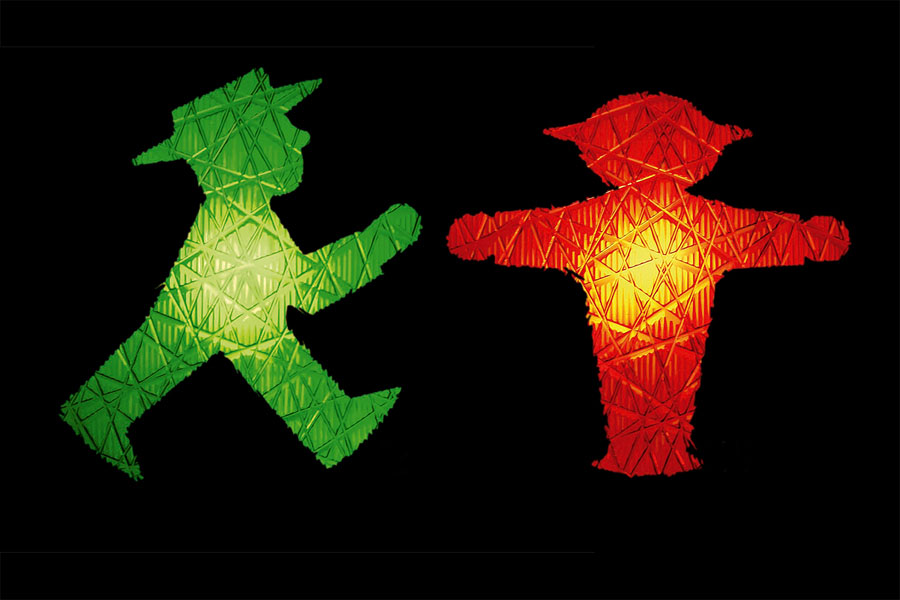
Ost-Ampelmännchen crosswalk lights

Those seeking the preservation of East German culture banded together to save the "Eastern Crosswalk Man" (Ost-Ampelmännchen), an illuminated depiction of a man wearing a "perky", "cheerful" and potentially "petit bourgeois" hat (inspired by a summer photo of Erich Honecker in a straw hat) in crosswalk lights. Many German cities in and near the former East German border, including Berlin, Lübeck and Erfurt, still retain the use of the Ampelmännchen at all or some pedestrian crossings due to its cultural relevance, and many souvenirs sold in the new states and in Berlin make use of the icon.

Life in the GDR has also been the subject of several films, including Leander Haußmann's Sonnenallee (1999), Wolfgang Becker's internationally successful Good Bye, Lenin! (2003), and Carsten Fiebeler's Kleinruppin forever (2004).

== Critical interpretations ==
Ostalgie could be inspired by the longing of the Ossis (German for "Easterners", a term for former GDR citizens) for the social system and the sense of community of the GDR. When Der Spiegel asked former GDR-inhabitants whether the GDR "had more good sides than bad sides" in 2009, 57% of them answered yes. To the statement of the interviewing journalist that "GDR inhabitants did not have the freedom to travel wherever they wanted", respondents replied that "present-day low-wage workers do not have that freedom either".

=== Ostalgie as "West-algie" ===
According to Dominic Boyer, the concept of nostalgia has been described for several centuries. Nostalgia is connected with nationalism; longing for the former homeland generates love for everything associated with it. This evokes negative feelings toward "foreign" products, customs or cultural influences. Boyer says that ostalgie is more than East German nostalgia, examining nostalgia in the context of the Second World War and Vergangenheitsbelastung ("the burden of the past"). The division of East and West Germany was not punishment for Germany's war crimes. Nazi Germany had made the German postwar generation shameful and anxious about its past. West and East Germany claimed that the other side was more "German", and was therefore more responsible for war crimes; this created a symbiotic relationship, which was eliminated by German reunification.

According to Boyer, West German opinion dominates the discourse about the West-East relationship and refuses to take the opinions of former East German members seriously. Boyer writes that ostalgie has created a "no-place" East Germany, which is only "realistic" from a West German perspective. The East German perspective (despite its individual history, policy, structure, way of life, and outlook) is invalid, and unable to challenge the "Western" image of East Germany. Enns Anthony wrote that understanding ostalgie should go "beyond the simple question of whose representation of the GDR is more valid or authentic"; what matters is the actual situation of former residents of the GDR.

== See also ==
- Culture of the German Democratic Republic
- DDR Museum – Berlin museum about life in East Germany
- Net shopping bag – Open netted bag
- Communist nostalgia, similar in different places
  - Nostalgia for the Polish People's Republic
  - Nostalgia for the Soviet Union – Post-1991 social phenomenon
  - Yugo-nostalgia – Nostalgia for Yugoslavia among ex-Yugoslav populations
- Vita Cola – Cola beverage produced in Germany
- Ossi and Wessi – Names for former East and West German citizens

=== Music ===
- Die anderen Bands
- Ostrock

=== Movies ===
- Ostern
- Do Communists Have Better Sex?
- Go Trabi Go
- The Lives of Others – 2006 German film by Florian Henckel von Donnersmarck

== Books and games ==
- Banchelli, Eva: Taste the East: Linguaggi e forme dell'Ostalgie, Sestante Edizioni, Bergamo 2006, ISBN 88-87445-92-3.
- Banchelli, Eva: Ostalgie: eine vorläufige Bilanz, in Fabrizio Cambi (Hg.): Gedächtnis und Identitat. Die deutsche Literatur der Wiedervereinigung, Würzburg, Koenigshausen & Neumann, 2008, pp. 57–68.
- Berdahl, Daphne: On the Social Life of Postsocialism: Memory, Consumption, Germany (2009)
- Rota, Andrea: Testi pubblicitari ostalgici: una breve analisi semiotica, In Linguistica e filologia 24/2007, pp. 137–152, ISSN|1594–6517.
- Pence, Katherine and Paul Betts. Socialist Modern: East German Everyday Culture and Politics, Ann Arbor: University of Michigan Press, 2008
- Ostalgie: The Berlin Wall (2018), video game by Kremlingames, where the playground is East Germany during the late Perestroika and the dissolution of Warsaw Pact.
