= Chocolate-coated marshmallow treats =

Marshmallow, usually on a wafer base, coated in chocolate

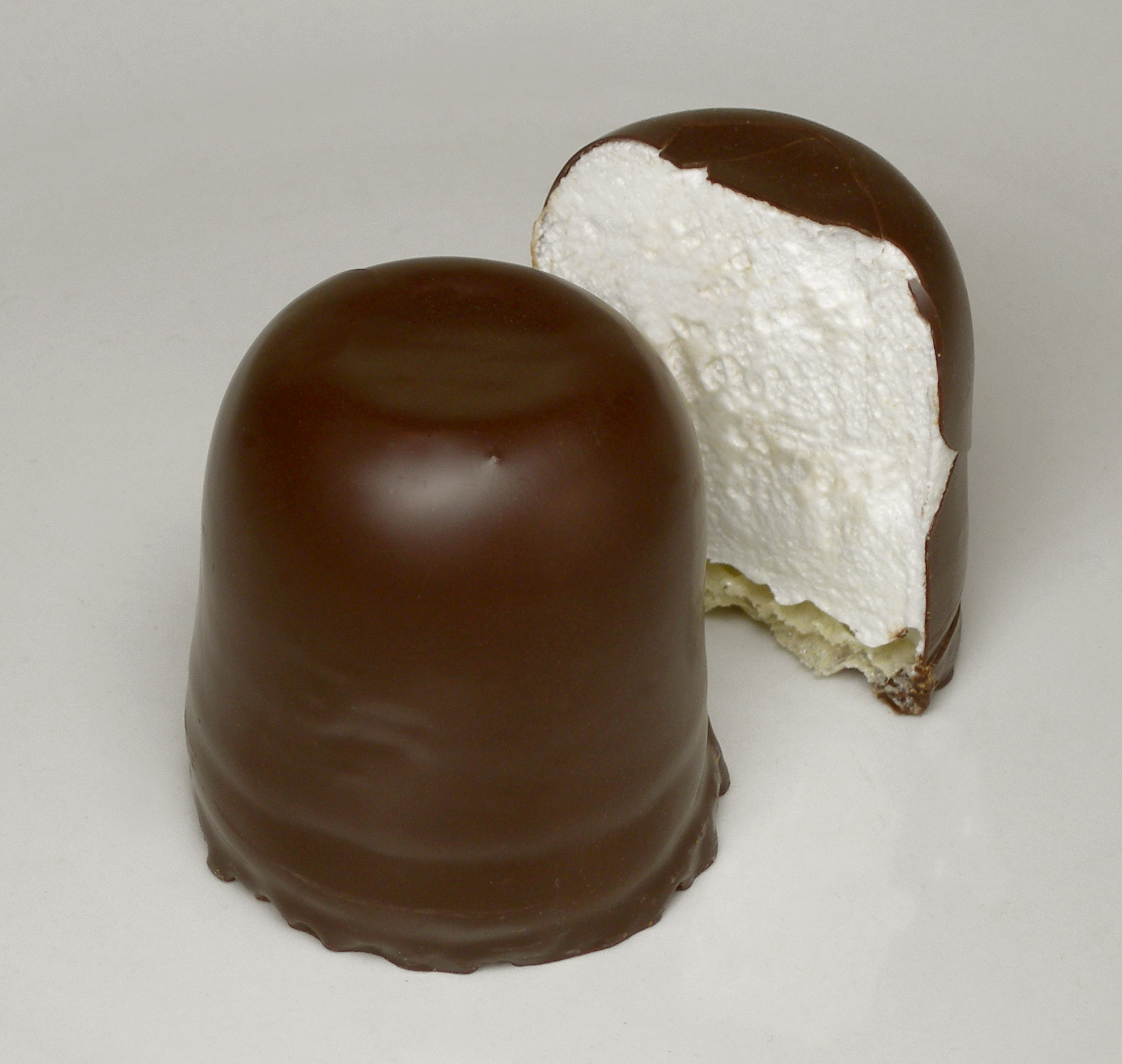
- Alternative names: Chocolate teacakes
- Type: Confection
- Place of origin: Europe
- Main ingredients: Egg whites, chocolate

Chocolate-coated marshmallow treats, also known as chocolate teacakes (especially in the United Kingdom) are confections consisting of a biscuit base topped with marshmallow-like filling and then coated in a hard shell of chocolate. They have been made since the 19th century in both Denmark, under the name flødeboller (lit. 'cream bun') and in Germany, under the name Mohrenkopf (lit. 'moor's head').

Numerous varieties exist, with regional variations in recipes. Some variants of these confections have previously been known in many countries by names comprising equivalents of the Spanish word negro.

== National varieties ==
=== North America ===
==== Canada ====
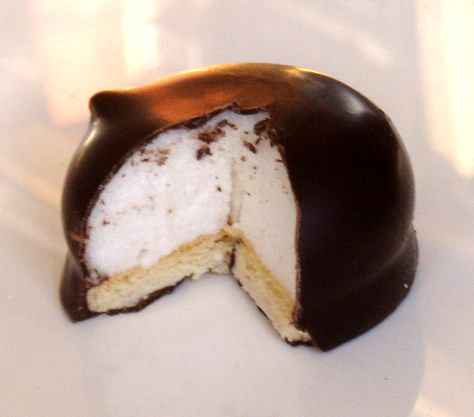
Canadian Whippet

Théophile Viau first manufactured these as "Empire" biscuits in Montreal, and introduced them at a hockey game in Westmount in 1901, but in 1927, in order to lower costs, he removed the vanilla and renamed the product "Whippets". Today, Whippets are produced in Cambridge, Ontario, Canada, by Dare Foods which bought the Viau bakery. They are currently available with both dark chocolate and milk chocolate coatings, and twelve varieties of flavors.

"Viva Puffs" are similar to Whippets; they are produced by Dare Foods in two flavours. Viva is a trade name; these confections have been known in Canada for at least 50 years as "chocolate puffs".

The cookies are similar to Mallomars of New York City. They also bear a striking resemblance to Tunnock's Tea Cakes as well as krembos. However, the Tunnock tea cake does not have the same kind of chocolate nor filling.

==== United States ====
In the United States, Mallomars are produced by Nabisco. A graham cracker circle is overlaid with extruded marshmallow, then coated in a thin shell of dark chocolate. Mallomars were introduced to the public in 1913, the same year as the Moon Pie (a confection that has similar ingredients). The first box of Mallomars was sold in West Hoboken, New Jersey (now Union City, New Jersey).

Mallomars are generally available from early October through to April. They are not distributed during the summer months, supposedly because they melt easily in summer temperatures, though this is as much for marketing reasons as for practical ones. Devoted eaters of the cookie have been known to stock up during winter months and keep them refrigerated over the summer, although Nabisco markets other chocolate-coated cookie brands year-round. (Those brands include Pinwheels, which also combines chocolate, cookie, and marshmallow.) Eighty-five percent of all Mallomars are sold in the New York metropolitan area. They are produced entirely within Canada, at a factory in Scarborough, Ontario.

=== Northern and Western Europe ===
==== Austria ====
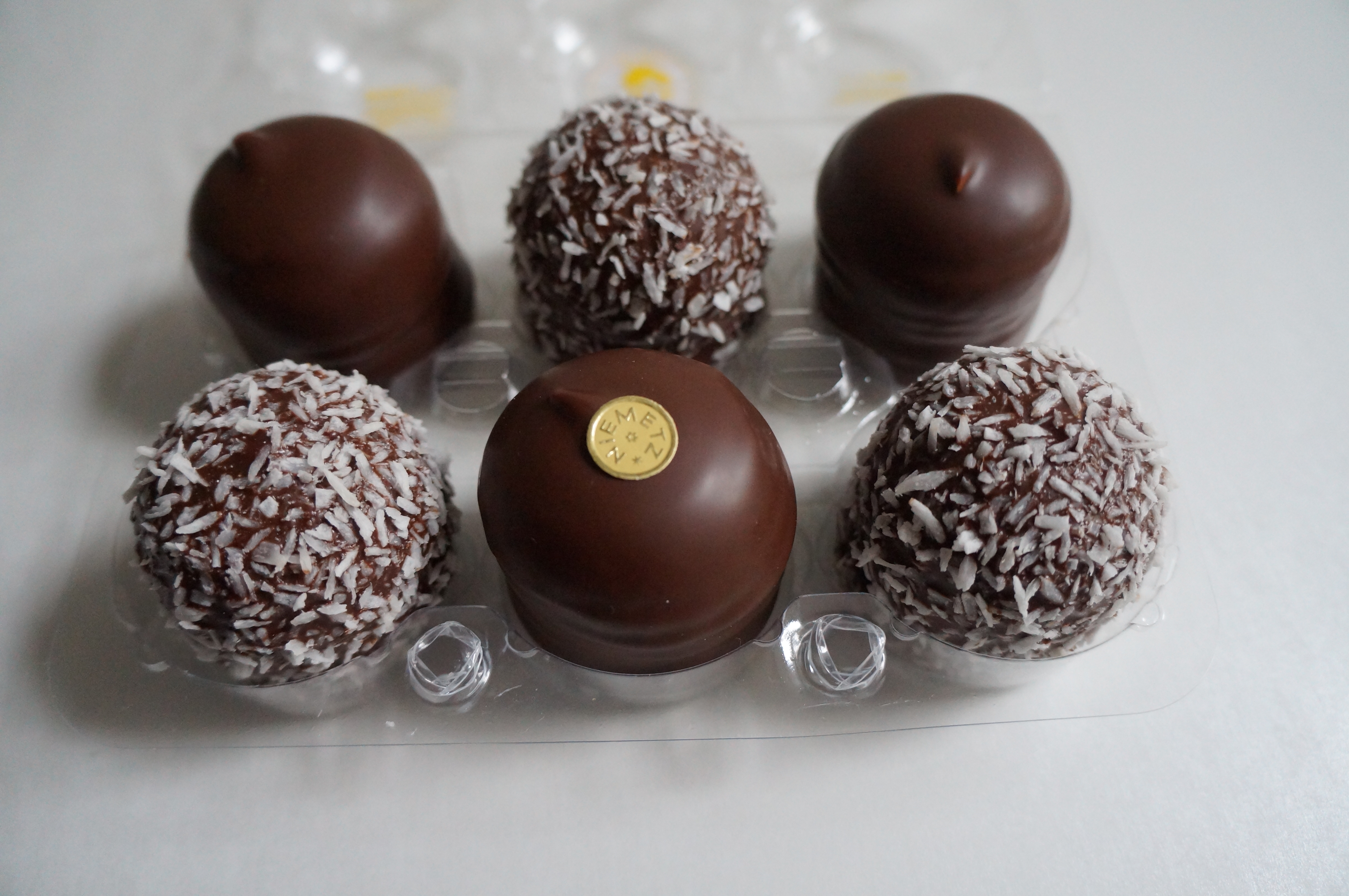
Schwedenbomben

The Austrian version of chocolate-coated egg white foam is called German: Schwedenbombe, lit. 'Sweden-bomb'. It was created in 1926 by Walter Niemetz who chose the name in honour of a friend of Swedish origin who had a hand in the development. Manufacturing started in 1930. Schwedenbomben were originally only sold at six per pack, but are now also available in packs of twelve and twenty. Regardless of the pack size, half the pieces in a pack are plain and the other half are sprinkled with coconut flakes.

Schwedenbomben are immensely popular in Austria. They have a market share of around 80% and a brand recognition of about 94%.

==== Denmark ====
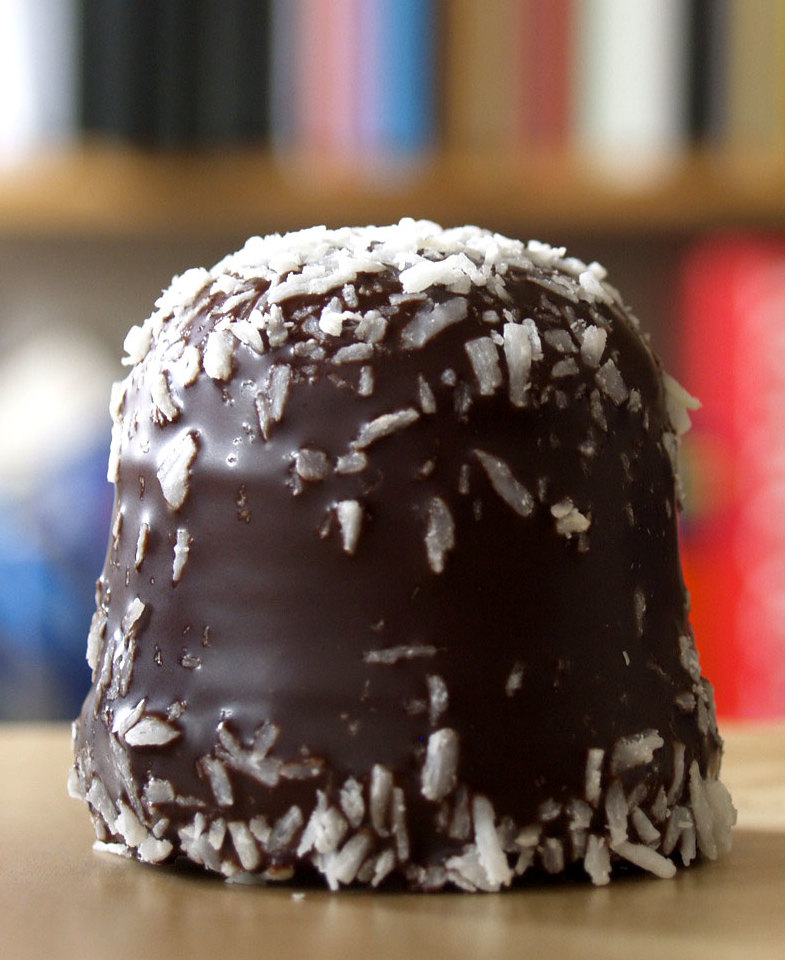
Flødebolle

Flødeboller have been made in Denmark since the 19th century. The treat was originally made using cream (hence the Danish name flødeboller—"cream buns"); however, the filling was later made from egg whites to help industrialize production and improve shelf life. In Denmark, the confection is known as a flødebolle (cream bun) and was in some parts, mostly in the Copenhagen area of Denmark, historically known as a negerbolle (negro bun) or negerkys (negro kiss). In the 1960s through 1980s, the term negro was phased out by all major producers due to its use as a racial slur. Denmark also markets a variation shaped more like a patty, hence the name bøf (steak). Note that the Swedish word negerboll is used for a similar but different confection (chokladboll, known as havregrynskugle in Danish).

Danish-based Chocolate factory Elvirasminde claims to produce between one and two million treats every day as of 2022.

In Denmark, chocolate-coated marshmallow treats are traditionally handed out in school by children on their birthday. They are found in any supermarket, and most confectioners will have delicacy versions. It is also a popular addition to ice cream cones, offered at most shops selling ice cream. Usually they are placed on top of the last ball of ice cream with whipped cream and jam (or guf, a topping made of whipped egg whites with sugar and fruit flavouring). Sometimes they are even found in restaurants. Many baking enthusiasts see them as a challenge, and it was a technical challenge in Den store Bagedyst (The Great Bake Off) on Danish TV.

The popularity of the treat is evident from the sheer number of varieties. Variations in coating range from white chocolate over dark chocolate to liquorice coating, with or without sprinkles. The base is often a plain wafer in commercial products, but delicacy and homemade versions often have shortbread, marzipan biscuits or other bases. Flavoured filling is also very common, especially when homemade, but liquorice, marzipan and other flavors are commercially available. Variation in form is also common, often seen in commercial products ranging from wide and flat (bøf) to tall with sharp edges (Christmas tree shapes).

Luxury versions have become more popular, and has also made the image of the flødebolle change from a basic candy or cake to a luxury product suitable as a dessert or present, similar to a box of high-quality chocolates.

==== Belgium ====
In Belgium, Milka branded it under the name Melo-Cakes. These popular treats are sold in packages of six to thirty pieces.

In Flanders, the confection is known as negerinnentetten. The word can either be translated as "negress's tits" or could originate from the French word for head, tête, as the French word for this confection used to be tête de nègre, which is French for "negro's head". This is also the probable origin of an alternative name negertetten. Nowadays manufacturers market the confection under a different name, as the aforementioned terms are considered to be offensive.

==== Germany ====
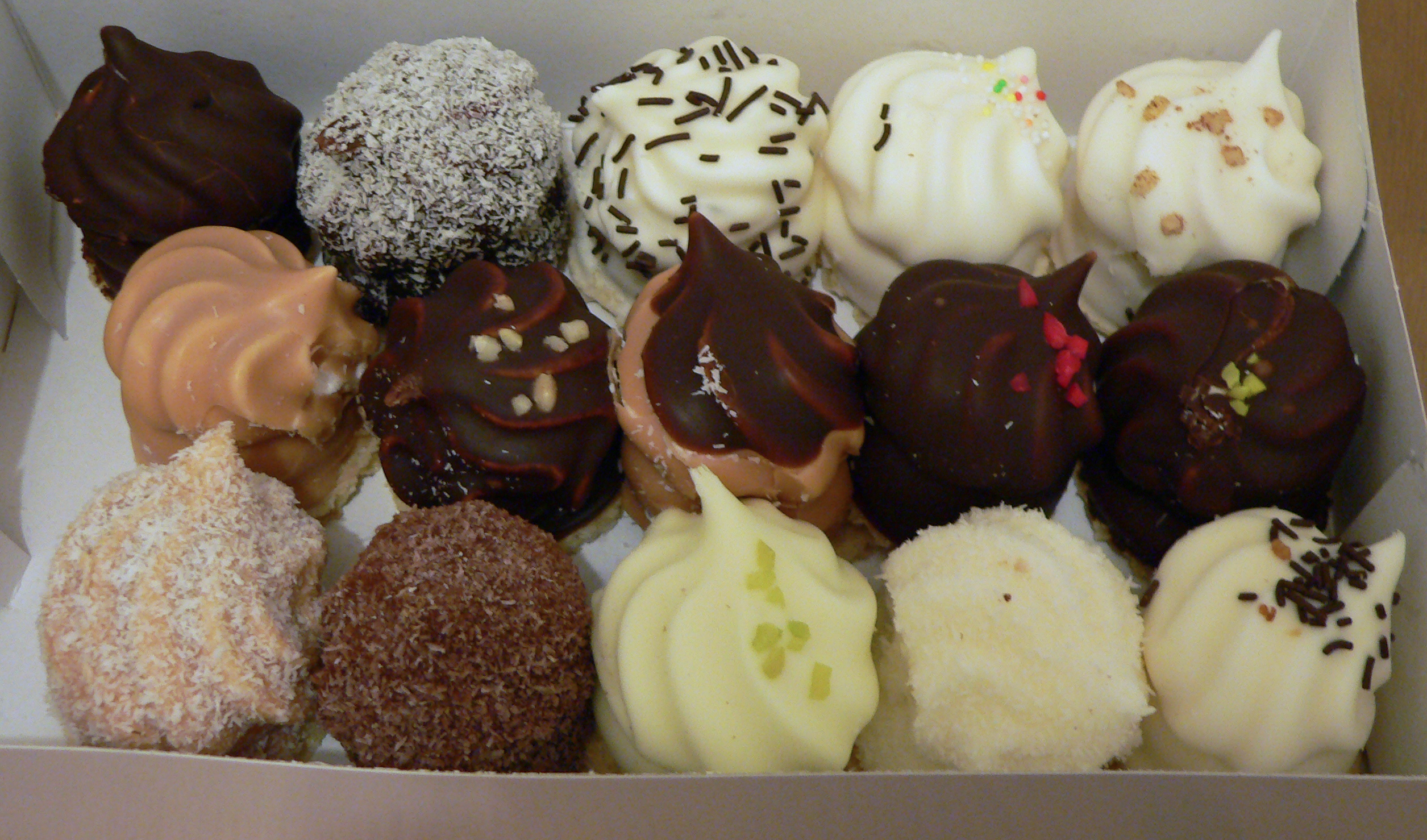
Fifteen varieties of artisanal Schokokuss

In Germany, the Schokokuss (pronounced [ˈʃoːkoˌkʊs]; "Choco-kiss") was first made commercially in 1920, although the first mention of them dates to 1892. Industrial manufacturing started in the 1950s. The sweets are made all year long, with approximately one billion made per year, placing average consumption at about one dozen per person per year. They are available in supermarkets and bakeries, and are traditionally sold at fairs. The interior is always egg white foam, sweetened with sugar, but there are also varieties using sugar substitutes available on the German market.

Sometimes they are consumed pressed between two halves of a bun, which is also referred to as a Matschbrötchen ("mud roll" or "squished bread roll") – mostly by children.

The original colloquial names were Mohrenkopf (Note: German: [ˈmoːʁənˌkɔp͡f]) ("moor's head") and Negerkuss ("negro's kiss"), but after eventually concluding that these names had racist connotations most companies changed the product-name to Schokoküsse (Note: German: [ˈʃoːkoˌkʏsə]) ("chocolate kisses"), Schaumküsse (Note: German: [ˈʃaʊ̯mˌkʏsə]) ("foam kisses") or to brand-specific names like Dickmann's.

==== Switzerland ====
Production in the Swiss factory Mohrenkopffabrik Dubler in Waltenschwil

In German-speaking Switzerland, they are still sold as Mohrenkopf. In the French-speaking part of Switzerland, as well as in France, they are known as têtes choco ("chocolate heads"); they are more commonly referred as tête-de-nègre in France, which is also a racial slur.

==== Great Britain ====
A similar confectionery in Britain is the Walnut Whip, but it differs from the domed biscuit or wafer based styles and contains a higher proportion of thicker rippled chocolate, topped with a half walnut.

===== Scotland =====
In Scotland, this confection is known as a chocolate teacake;, the confection is entirely unlike the English teacake, a sweet roll with dried fruit which is served toasted and buttered. Teacakes are generally served in the afternoon alongside a traditional British tea. There are several manufacturers of chocolate teacakes in the UK, though the best known is Tunnock's, a Scottish company founded in 1890. It was invented by Sir Boyd Tunnock in 1956. He developed the idea of using Italian meringue. He made a biscuit base, hand piped the mallow on to the base and covered it in milk chocolate. The Tunnock's teacake is commonly regarded in the same food category as the British biscuit, eaten at break times with a cup of tea as shown in advertising for the product. Popular throughout the UK, the Tunnock's Teacake enjoys iconic status in Scotland, evoking memories of childhood, or symbolising "home" for Scots around the world.

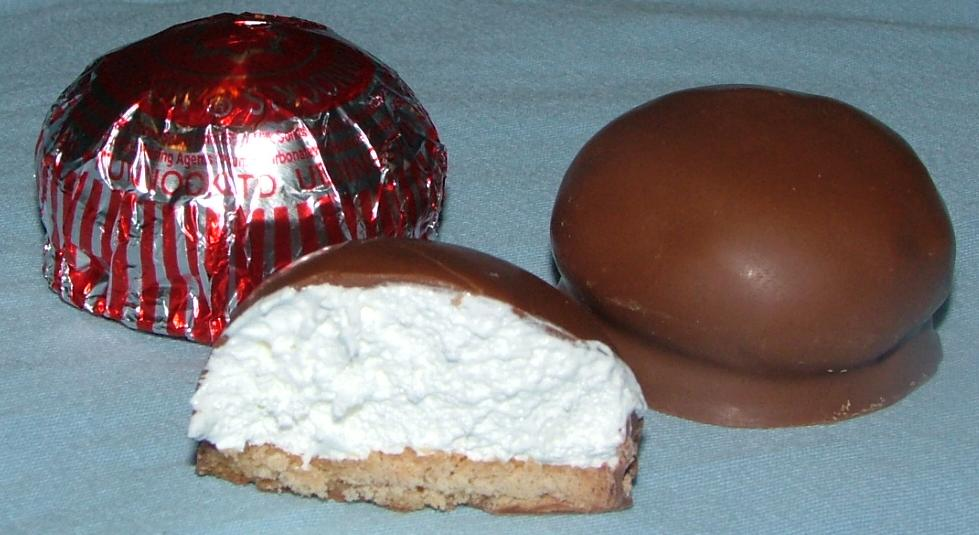
Three Tunnock's teacakes from Scotland, one unwrapped and one sliced in half to show the Italian meringue filling

The Scottish National Blood Transfusion Service gives Tunnock's teacakes to blood donors in Scotland after giving blood. There is an online appreciation society for the Tunnock's teacake and Dundee University also has an appreciation society for the Tunnock's teacake. A giant fully edible replica of a Tunnock's teacake was made by Michelle Kershaw and Nick Dodds at Pimp That Snack. The opening ceremony of the 2014 Commonwealth Games in Glasgow featured giant dancing Tunnock's teacakes.

The product itself consists of a small round shortbread base covered with a hemisphere of Italian meringue, a whipped egg white concoction similar to marshmallow. As this soft white fondant is based on egg white rather than gelatine, it is much more delicate than marshmallow. This also means that a Tunnock's teacake is suitable for vegetarians, unlike any marshmallow-based alternatives. The Italian meringue is then coated in a thin layer of milk or plain chocolate and, in the case of Tunnock's, wrapped in a distinctive red and silver foil for the more popular milk chocolate variety, and a blue and gold wrapping for the plain chocolate type. Several competing brands to Tunnock's, such as Lees' Foods, also include jam in the centre of the teacake. The marshmallow filling is also firmer. In 2013, British café chain Costa Coffee introduced the giant marshmallow teacake, which is around three times the size of a standard teacake, with a chocolate biscuit base topped with marshmallow and raspberry jam in the centre.

An argument about whether the teacake is a biscuit or a cake led to an action in the European Court of Justice by British company Marks and Spencer. The UK tax authorities eventually accepted the company's argument that the teacakes were cakes (chocolate covered biscuits are taxed, cakes are not) but refused to repay most of the VAT. The European court ruled that in principle the tax should be repaid and in a further hearing before the UK Law Lords in 2009, after 13 years of litigation, Marks and Spencer won full repayment of the tax they had paid from 1973 to 1994, amounting to £3.5 million. This case was fought with Jaffa cakes.

==== Netherlands ====
In the Netherlands, it was referred Negerzoenen ("negro kisses") until 2006. In 2005, the Foundation for Honor and Reparation of Payments for Victims of Slavery in Suriname fought to change the name, which happened shortly after. One of the largest producers changed the name to Zoenen ("kisses") and others followed. This led to some controversy, since the Dutch word neger was perceived by some as more neutral compared to the English equivalent negro, though both terms are now widely considered pejorative and racist. These are often packaged with nine per box, creating the play on words Negen Zoenen ("nine kisses").

==== Finland ====
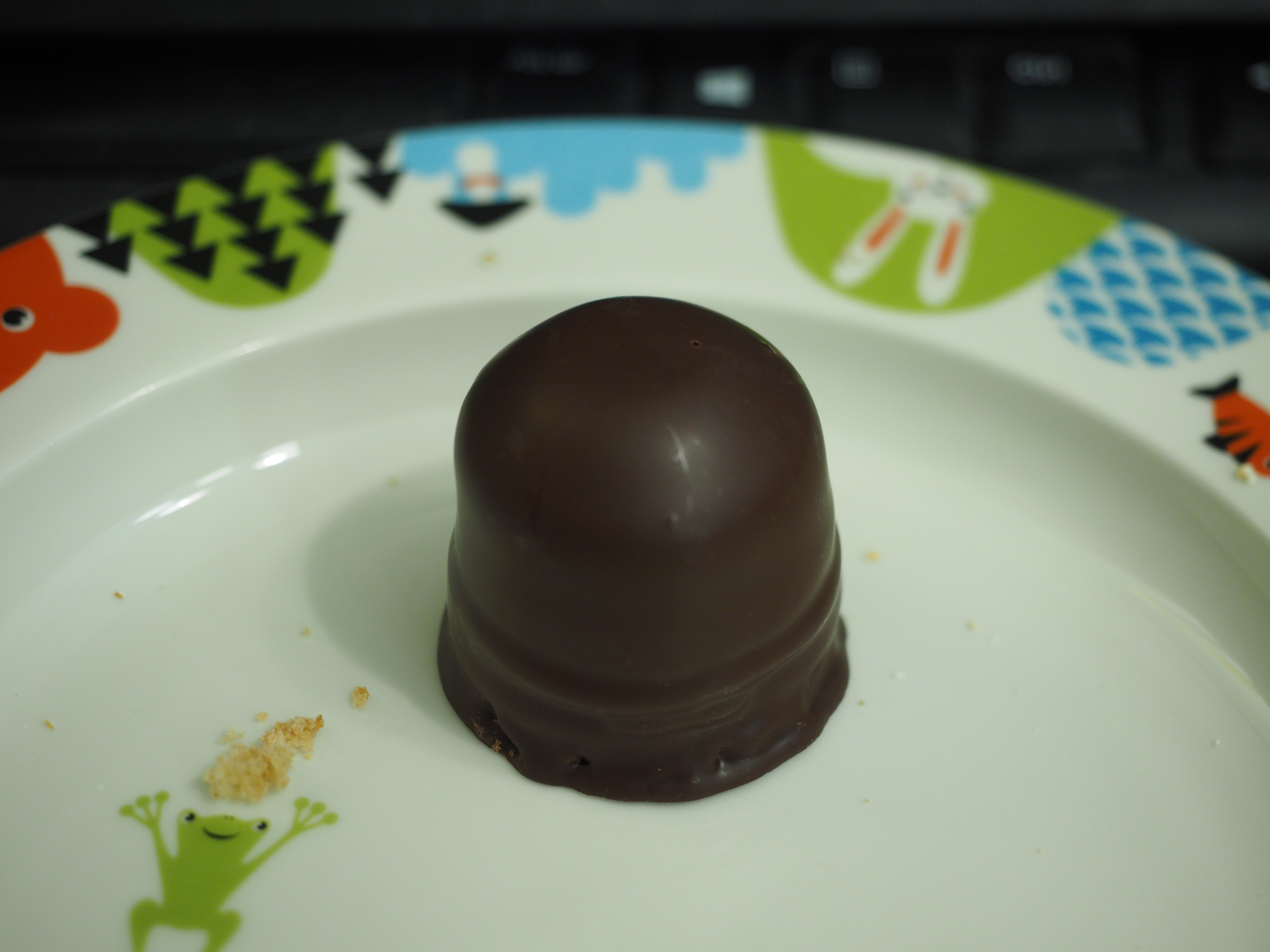
A Finnish "Brunberg's Kiss" without its wrapping

In Finland, the name originated from Germany, and they were named "Negro's Kisses" (neekerinsuukot) in 1951. The name was changed to "Brunberg's Kisses" (Brunberginsuukot) in 2001, after the manufacturer Brunberg from Porvoo; the name was changed for the same reasons as in Denmark, Germany, and other countries.

=== Eastern, Central and Southeastern Europe ===
==== Hungary ====
In Hungary, the product is called négercsók ("Negro kiss") and was first introduced in 1980 by the New World Farming and Food Industry Co-operative Society (Hungarian: Újvilág Mezőgazdasági és Élelmiszeripari Szövetkezet) to great success. The production was based on a Danish example, with Danish machinery. Production gradually declined in the 1990s when local confectionaries and food factories had to face heavy competition from abroad.

==== Russia ====
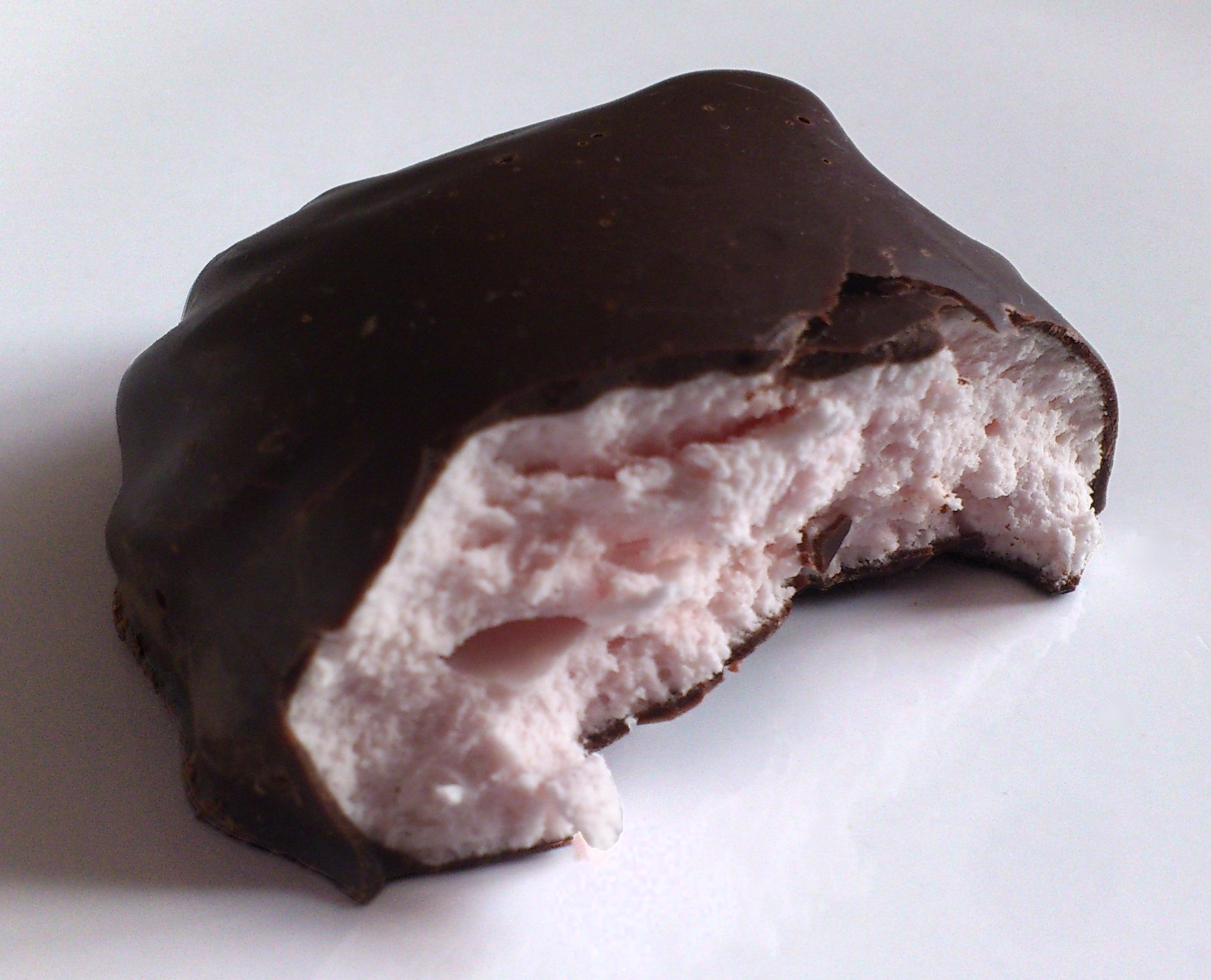
A chocolate-coated zefir

Zefir (Russian: зефи́р, may also be spelled zephyr or zephir) is made from fruit and berry purée with added sugar and whipped egg whites. It is commonly produced and sold in the countries of the former Soviet Union. The recipe is a merger of the traditional Russian pastila with French meringue. The name given after the Greek god of the light west wind Zephyr symbolizes its delicate airy consistency.

The consistency is similar to that of marshmallows, Schokokuss or krembo. The form typically resembles traditional meringue. However, in contrast to commercial meringue, it is never crisp. Both pure and chocolate-coated versions are widespread. In contrast to the other confectioneries of this type, it has no biscuit base.

==== Slovenia ====
In Slovenia, these confections are known as indijančki (literally "little indians"). They are also known as zamorčki ("little negroes").

==== Slovakia ====
In Slovakia, these are known as čierny princ (literally "black prince").

==== Poland ====
Warm ice cream (Polish: ciepłe lody) is a Polish dessert or confection that could be seen as a version of the chocolate-covered marshmallow treat.

==== Serbia ====
Produced in Serbia by Jaffa, the Munchmallow has a biscuit base and a soft mallow filling covered by a chocolate flavoured coating, and is very similar to the original Glasgow version.

=== Southeastern Asia ===
==== Philippines ====
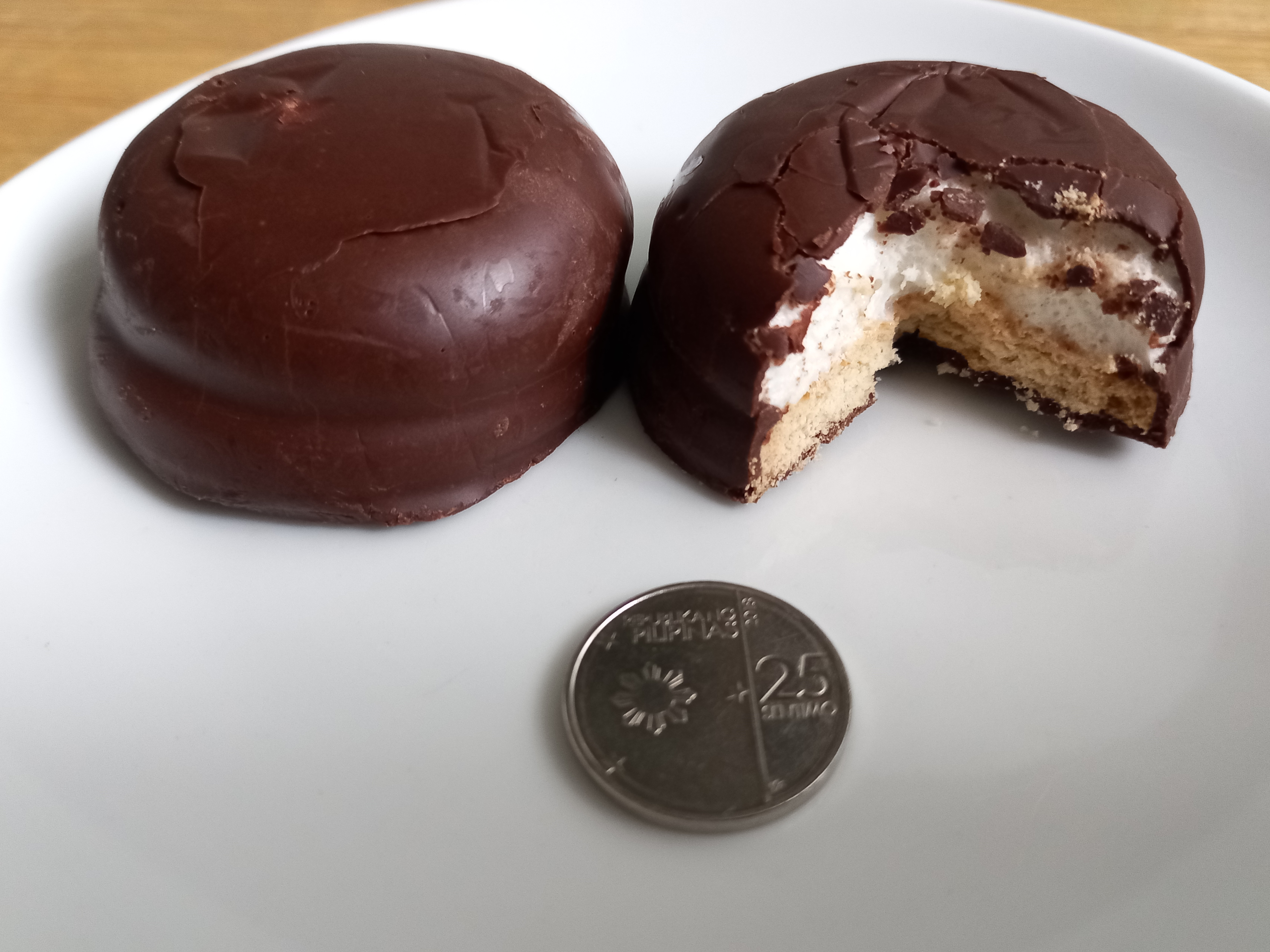
Choco Mallows with 25 centavo to scale

In the Philippines, Fibisco has "Choco Mallows". Likely to allow for better shelf life in the tropical climate, its "hard chocolate shell" is actually a soft chocolate covering that does not completely melt at room temperature.

=== Southern Europe ===
==== Portugal ====
In Portugal, these confections are known as bombocas. Sold by different brands, usually the supermarket ones. They are sold in three main flavors: meringue (white interior), strawberry (pink) and vanilla (yellow). They are being called beijinhos, meaning "kisses", in the last few years.

=== Latin America ===
==== Argentina ====
In Argentina, the confections were first commercialised in the 1970s and known as "Angelito negro" (Little Black Angel) and later, "cremocoa". They were manufactured by Terrabusi and are no longer in production, as in the country only the Uruguayan "ricarditos" are available.

==== Bolivia ====
In Bolivia, Chocolates Condor is the traditional manufacturer of "Beso de Negro" (Negro Kiss). The confection is similar to the German Schokoküsse in its use of a sweetened egg white foam filling rather than a marshmallow-based filling. There have been attempts to introduce variations in flavor, but the "classic" version remains the most popular.

==== Peru ====
In Peru, the confections are known as "Beso de Moza" (Girl's Kiss), sold by Nestlé. Currently there is a contest between strawberry and lúcuma flavors to become permanent versions of the product.

==== Colombia ====
In Colombia and Ecuador, it is called Beso de Negra (Black Woman's Kiss) or "Chocmelo", a portmanteau of chocolate and masmelo (marshmallow). However, these last ones do not always have a cookie as its base.

In 2020, during the George Floyd protests, Nestlé announced it would rename the confectionery and remove the image on its packaging of a black woman with bare shoulders and a colorful dress. (Note: The image was originally described by CNN as "una mujer negra, esta con los hombros descubiertos y con un vestido colorido" [a Black woman, she is bare-shouldered and wearing a colorful dress].)

==== Brazil ====
In Brazil, the dessert is known as Nhá Benta. It is manufactured by the Kopenhagen chocolaterie. Other variants exist in Brazil. Examples include Cacau Show's Montebello (does not contain the waffle base), and the one that popularised the international formula for the masses in Brazil, the Dan-Top. The cookies are sold in a variety of flavours, including coconut, lemon, passion fruit, caramel, boysenberry, tonka bean and coffee. It is also known as "teta-de-nega" ("black woman's tit").

==== Uruguay ====
In Uruguay, it is known as "Ricardito" (little Richard); the confection is meringue covered in chocolate, and is manufactured by Ricard.

=== Oceania ===
==== Australia ====
Arnott's Chocolate Royals are a chocolate coated-marshmallow treat of Australia, which are available in milk and dark chocolate varieties, and are similar in appearance to a Tunnock's teacake. Unlike Tunnock's, however, Royals have a thin layer of jam between the biscuit and marshmallow; they are also smaller in size compared to a Tunnock's teacake.

Previously, there is a variation on the chocolate-coated marshmallow treats which are coated in desiccated coconut, sold by Betta Foods under the Eskimo Snowballs name, before it was discontinued. Similarly, such treats are sold through supermarkets, such as Coles under the name Snow Drops.

==== New Zealand ====
Since the 1960s, the New Zealand biscuit manufacturers Griffin's have made MallowPuffs, a chocolate biscuit that is described as a "light fluffy marshmallow sitting on top of a shortcake biscuit, covered in luxurious milk chocolate". The marshmallow in MallowPuffs tends to be more dense and rubbery than in some similar products (such as Tunnock's chocolate teacakes). They come in a variety of flavours, including Cookies and Cream, Hokey Pokey, Toffee, Rocky Road, Double Chocolate and original chocolate. The slogan from a national advertising campaign for MallowPuffs, "Have you done enough for a MallowPuff", became briefly popular in the 1990s.

=== Southern Africa ===
==== South Africa ====
In South Africa, a similar confection is Sweetie Pies, originally made by Cadbury's; it is now produced by Beyers.

=== Middle East ===
==== Iran ====
In Iran, this is considered a popular treat for children. The local version is sold under several brands, all commonly called (Persian: بستنی زمستانی, romanized: Bastani zemestani; literally meaning "winter ice cream"). Previously it was called Negrogis, after the company which manufactured it in the country.

==== Levantine countries ====
In Levantine countries such as Syria, Lebanon, and Jordan, it has historically been called (Arabic: راس العبد, romanized: Ras Al-Abed; slave head), however it has since been renamed to Sambo. In Lebanon, a local variation went on sale in the 1950s under the name ras el abd (slave's head) by Gandour; however, it has since been changed to Tarboush or Tarboosh (Fez) but continues to be referred to by the former name in public.

==== Israel ====
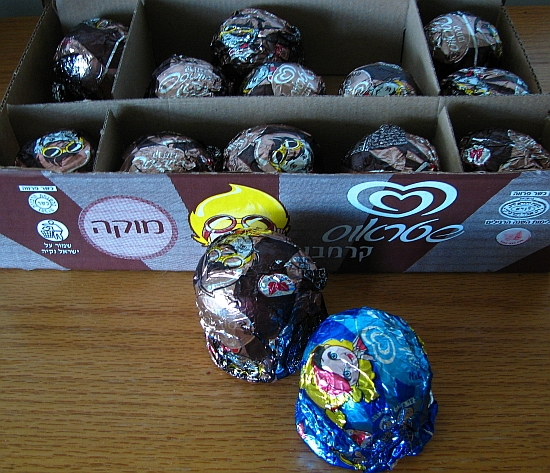
Foil-wrapped krembo, mocha and vanilla flavors

Krembo or creambo (Hebrew: קרמבו, a contraction meaning literally "cream-in-it"), is the name of a chocolate-coated marshmallow treat that is popular in Israel, especially in the winter as an alternative to ice-cream. "Krembo whipped snack" consists of a round biscuit base (17% of total weight), topped with fluffy marshmallow creme–like foam (53%), coated in a thin layer of compound chocolate (about 30%) and wrapped in colorful, thin aluminium foil. Over time, different flavorings have been attempted for the foam by the different manufacturers, but the most popular have always predominantly been the vanilla flavoring and, to a lesser extent, the mocha flavoring. According to a study from 2003, funded by Strauss, Israel's leading krembo producer, 69% of Israelis prefer to eat krembos from the top down (starting with the cream), and only 10% start with the biscuit at the bottom; the rest had no preference.

European chocolate-coated marshmallow treats were popular as homemade sweets in Mandate Palestine. It entered mass production in 1966. The first manufacturer, the Whitman Company, coined the name Krembo. In Hebrew, the word krembo is a combination of krem (cream) and bo (in it), and ever since only that name has been in use. A mocha flavour was introduced in 1967. In 1979, Whitman was acquired by Strauss which has the major part of the krembo market in Israel. During the 1980s and 1990s, smaller manufacturers introduced additional flavours such as banana and strawberry but failed to achieve a significant market share. Today Strauss controls 54% of the krembo market in Israel.

Krembos are a seasonal treat sold only four months a year, from October to February. Nevertheless, 50 million krembos are sold each year—an average of 9 per person. Krembos are exported to the United States and Canada, and sold mostly in kosher shops and import stores.

In 2005, Strauss signed an agreement with Unilever to export ice cream and krembos to the United States and Canada due to a demand for products of this type with strict kosher certification. Under terms of the agreement, they may be sold only in kosher supermarkets and import shops. The distributor in North America is Dairy Delight, a subsidiary of Norman's Dairy. In 2007, Nestlé introduced an ice cream variation of krembo called lekbo (Hebrew: לקבו, "lick inside").

The average krembo weighs 25 grams (0.88 ounces) and has 115 calories. According to the fine print on packing foil, per 100 g of krembo there are 419 calories, 3.2 g protein, 64 g carbohydrates (of which 54 g are sugars); 16.7% fats (of which 13.9% are poly-saturated fatty acids, less than 0.5% are trans fatty acids) and 67 mg sodium.

== Other variations ==
=== Chocolate-covered marshmallow ===
Chocolate-covered marshmallows or chocolate-dipped marshmallows are confections of marshmallow coated with chocolate, without a biscuit base. Varieties include chocolate fish and Bamsemums.

==== Chocolate fish ====
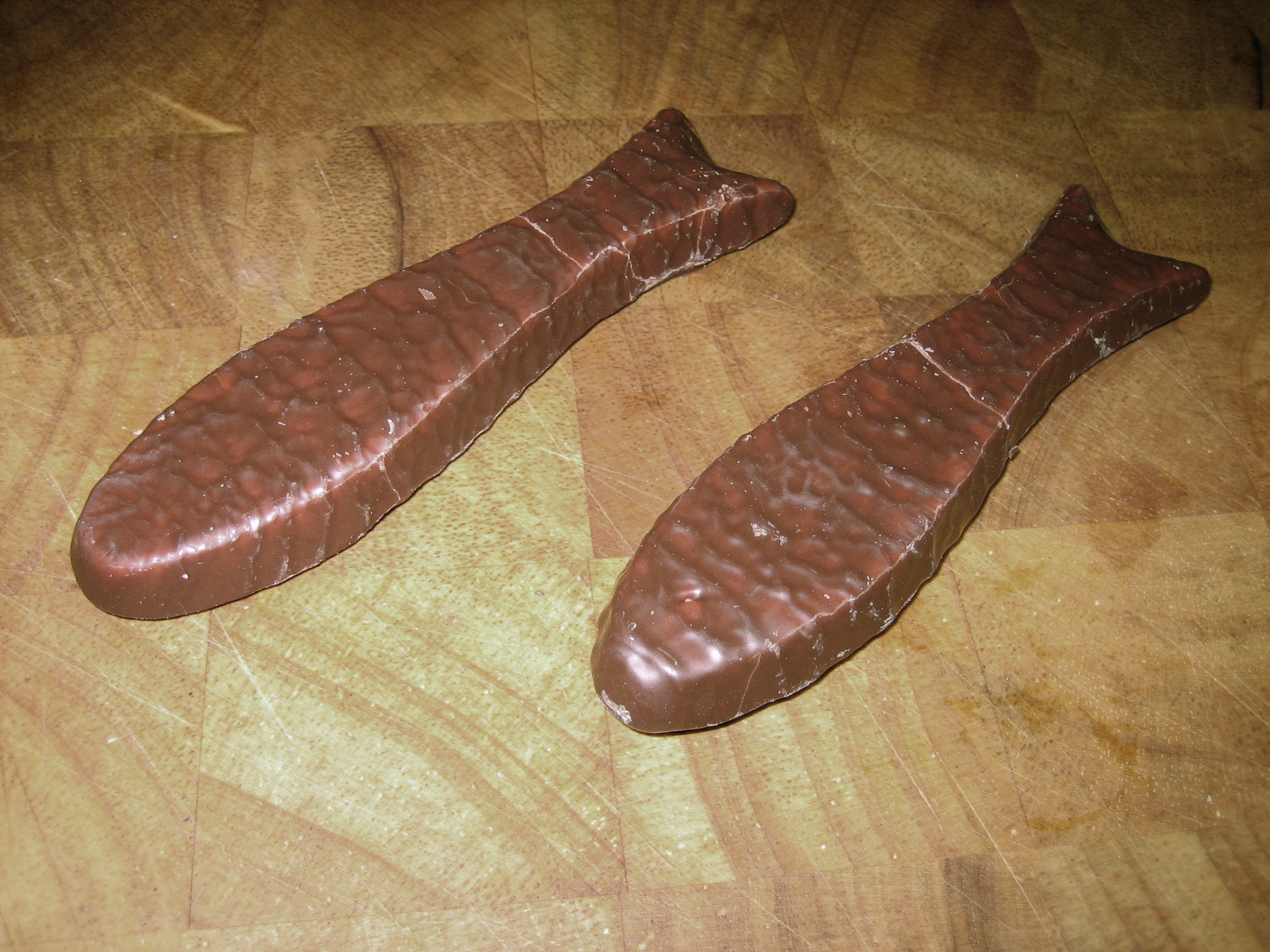
Two chocolate fish from New Zealand

In New Zealand, a common chocolate-coated marshmallow treat is the chocolate fish. A fish-shaped delicacy, 12 to 20 centimeters (5 to 8 inches) in length, it is made of pink or white marshmallow covered in a thin layer of milk chocolate. The milk chocolate's texture features scale-like ripples on the fish, created by the fish moving under a blower during production.

In Kiwi culture, the chocolate fish is a common immediate reward or prize for a small job done well (e.g. "Give that kid a chocolate fish") so much so that a phrase suggesting a person be awarded one can be said regardless of availability of the treat (and either as a compliment or sarcastically).

==== Cups ====
Milk chocolate cups may be filled with marshmallow in products including Mallo Cup and Valomilk.

=== Chocolate marshmallow pies ===
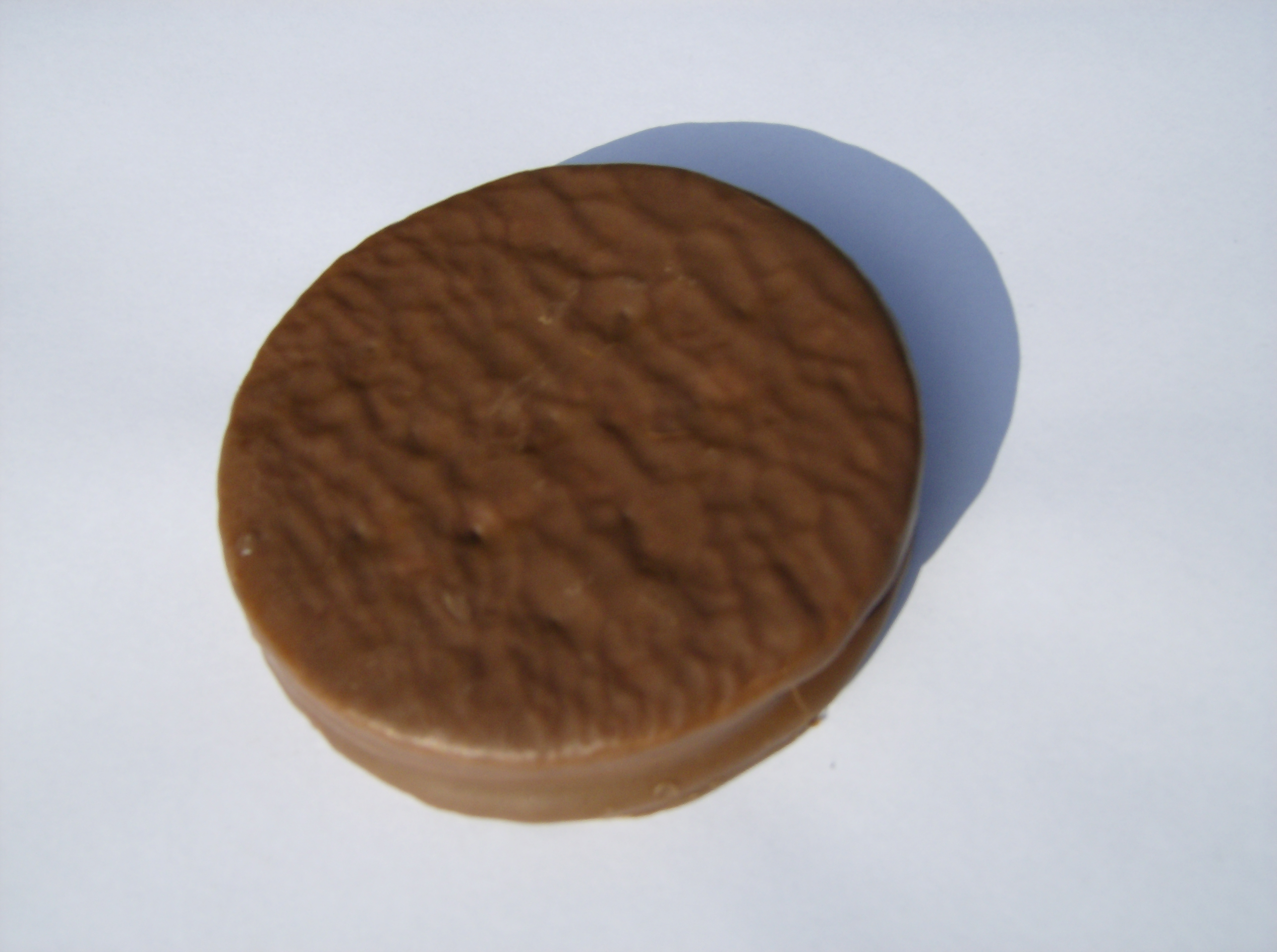
Wagon Wheel

Chocolate marshmallow pies differ from regular chocolate-coated marshmallow treats in that there is a cake- or cookie-like layer above as well as below the marshmallow filling – that is, the marshmallow filling is sandwiched between two layers of cake or cookie, the entirety then being enrobed in chocolate. Some local names for chocolate marshmallow pies are:

- "Chocolate marshmallow pie" (a generic term) in the United States (e.g., Little Debbie Chocolate Flavored Marshmallow Pies).
- "Moon Pie" (a brand name of Chattanooga Bakery) in the United States, particularly the Southern United States.
- "Scooter Pie" (a brand name of Burry's) in the United States, particularly in the Northeastern United States.
- "Choco pie" (originally a brand name, now a common noun as a generic trademark), originally in South Korea but now also in Russia and other parts of East Asia, South Asia and Southeast Asia.
- "Angel pie" (a brand name of Morinaga) in Japan.
- "Wagon Wheels" (a brand name used by both Burton's Biscuit and Dare Foods) in the United Kingdom, Canada, Australia and certain other countries.

== See also ==
- List of chocolate-covered foods
- Chocolate marshmallow log
- S'more
- Whoopie pie
- Merveilleux (dessert)
- Modjeska (confection)
