= Elvirasminde (building) =

Building in Aarhus, Denmark

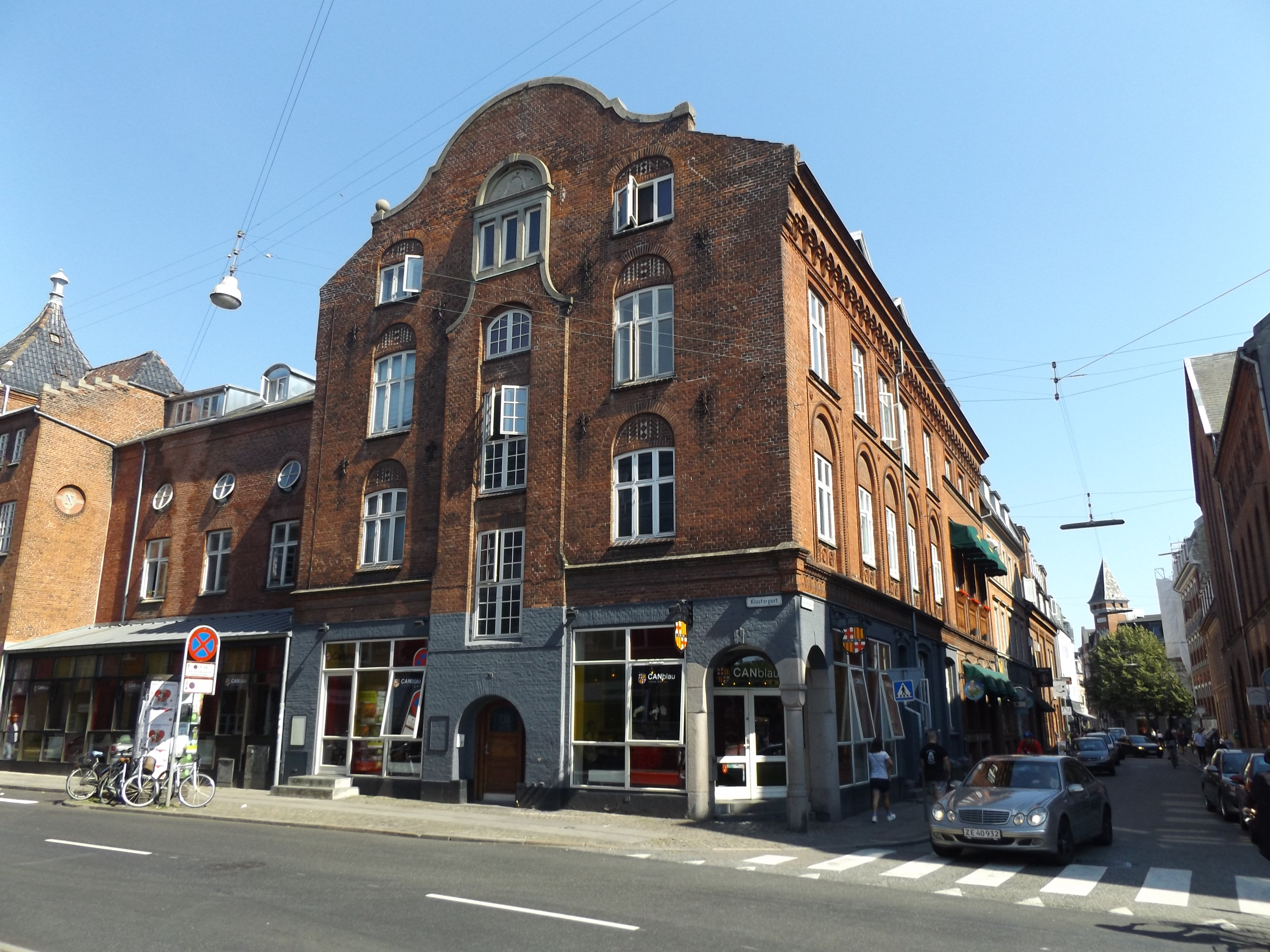
- Front facade of Elvirasminde
- Interactive map of the Elvirasminde area
- Alternative names: Chokoladefabrikken

General information
- Architectural style: Neoclassical
- Location: Aarhus, Denmark
- Coordinates: 56.15892°N 10.20637°E
- Named for: Elvirasminde
- Completed: 1912
- Owner: Olav de Linde

Technical details
- Material: Brick
- Floor count: 4

Design and construction
- Architect: Christian Frühstück Nielsen

Elvirasminde (Lit. Elvira's Memory) or Chokoladefabrikken (English: The Chocolate Factory) is a building complex and former factory in Aarhus, Denmark. Elvirasminde was built in 1912 by designs from the architect Christian Frühstück Nielsen. The factory was one of the many industrial enterprises that were established in the city in the early 20th century and the buildings represent the industrial architecture of the time. It is situated on Klostergade in the historic Latin Quarter neighborhood and today houses small upstarts and a number of creative businesses such as architect companies.

The buildings are named after the chocolate manufacturer Elvirasminde which built and was based in the buildings until the 1960s. The factory was in turn named after Elvira, the late wife of the founder.

== History ==
In 1875, the company and chocolate factory Elvirasminde was established in Aarhus through a series of mergers of smaller companies. The company eventually built a factory building in Klostergade in 1912. The company expanded and started producing many different kinds of chocolate and sugary sweets. In 1913 the company had 325 employees which later grew to 500 making it one of the major industrial employers in the city.

In the interwar period the company failed to modernize and by the 1950s sales faltered. The company cut the workforce to 200 workers but was eventually merged with Rønning & Co. The company moved to the Aarhus suburb Hasselager in 1967 but when the factory burned down in 1985 production was moved to Skanderborg where it remains today.

== Architecture ==
The building complex comprises 10.000 square meters situated in one of the oldest streets in the city. The factory was designed by Christian Frühstück Nielsen who was one of the first architects to have been born and raised in Aarhus. Elvirasminde is one of a number of Neoclassical buildings he designed in the city. The factory has been expanded numerous times over the years but has retained a homogenous appearance. It is a 4 story building of red brick with a hip roof and dormer windows.

The Culture History Museum of Randers has examined and evaluated the buildings and found that the former chocolate factory remains a well-preserved industry complex and testifies to the early industrial history of the city. The buildings is architecturally of a high quality and illustrates how industry started in the cities and later moved to the outer suburbs.
