= Cup-o-Gold =

Candy bar brand

Cup-O-Gold

Cup-o-Gold is a candy bar in the form of a chocolate cup with a marshmallow center and contains almonds and coconut. It is similar to products such as Mallo Cups or Valomilk. It was invented in the 1950s by the Hoffman Candy Company in Los Angeles and is now distributed by Los Angeles candy company Adams & Brooks. It is available primarily on the West Coast but can also be bought online through the manufacturer's website.
