= Church window (disambiguation) =

Church windows are windows in a church.

Church window can also refer to:

- Church window (dessert)
- Stained glass window, associated with churches
- Vetrate di Chiesa ('Church Windows'), a piece of music by Ottorino Respighi
