= Elvirasminde =

Danish chocolate company

Coordinates: 56.049780°N 9.947623°E

Elvirasminde A/S
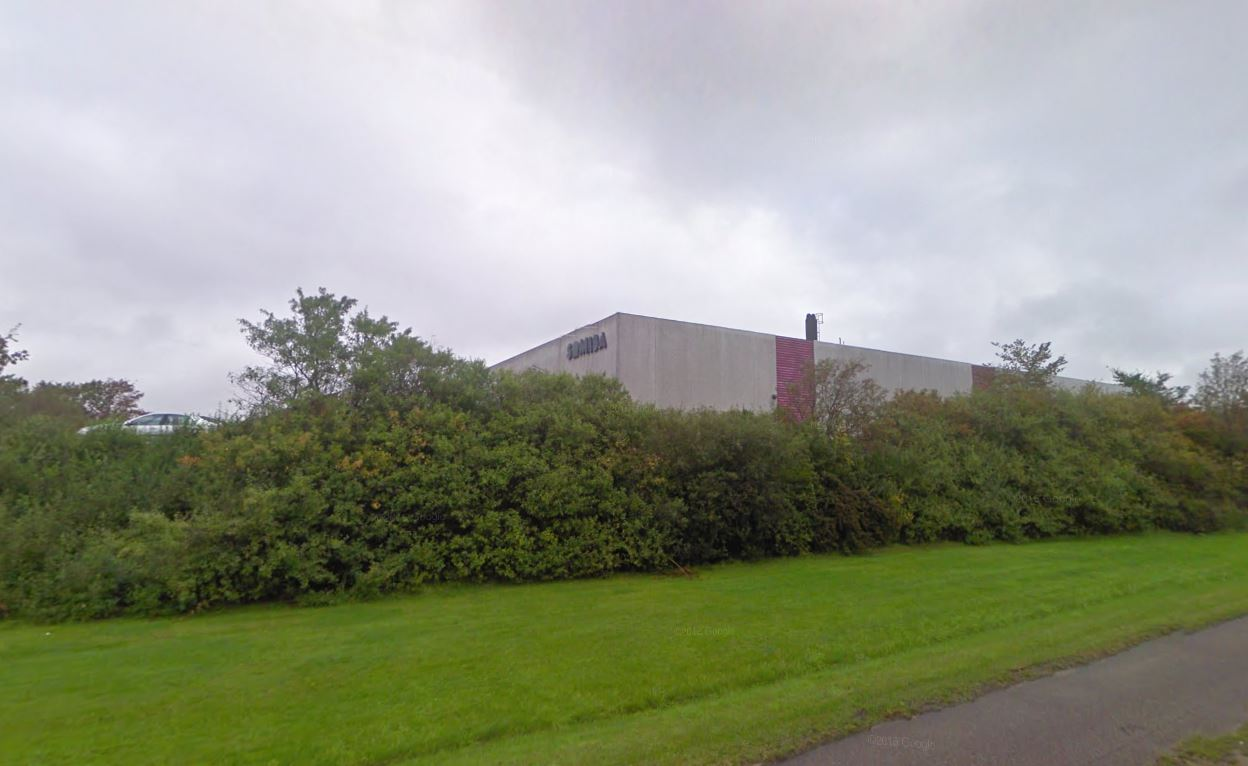
- Elvirasminde in Skanderborg
- Company type: Public limited company
- Industry: Manufacturing
- Founded: 1875
- Founder: Fritz George Clausen
- Headquarters: Aarhus, Denmark
- Area served: Worldwide
- Products: Chocolate
- Brands: Samba
- Owner: Spangsberg Chokoladefabrik
- Website: Elvirasminde

Elvirasminde is a Danish company and chocolate factory in Skanderborg, Denmark. It is a major producer of sweets and nationally the largest producer of Flødeboller, a Danish version of chocolate-coated marshmallow treats under the brand name Samba. By 2016 it produced 1-2 million units per day and sold them worldwide. The company is situated in northern Skanderborg on Danmarksvej.

In 2014 Spangsberg Chokoladefabrik based in Copenhagen bought Elvirasminde and moved its production of Spangsberg marshmallow treats to the factory in Skanderborg.

== History ==
In 1866 Eiler Christian Mehl established a chocolate factory in Aarhus which was bought by Anton Theodor Ramsing in 1875. Ramsing named the company Elvirasminde after his wife Elvira. The factory was stopped in 1901 and sold to Frits Georg Clausen who already owned a sweets factory. He merged all production and other activities in one company which he established in Klostergade.

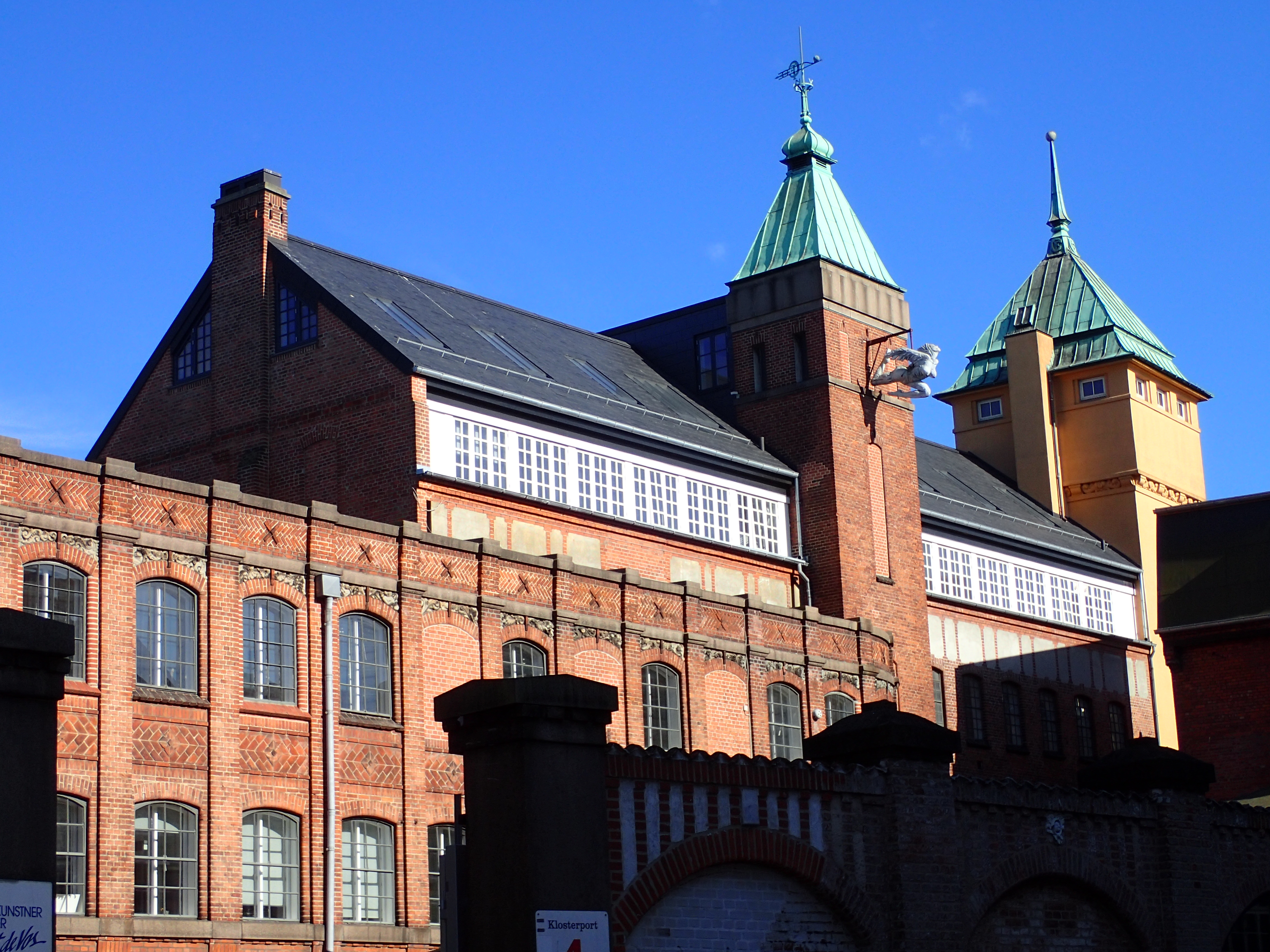
The original chocolate factory in Aarhus.

The company quickly expanded and started producing many different kinds of chocolate and sugar sweets including an assortment with dried fruit. Frits Georg Clausen also developed his own chocolate type called Danica which became a major success. In 1913 the company had 325 employees which later grew to 500, many under 18 and mostly women.

Clausen died in 1927 and the company became publicly traded with the majority shares owned by the family. The board initially consisted of Jørgen Sørensen and Frits Clausens two brothers August Clausen and Johannes Clausen. August Clausen also acted as the CEO but retired in 1943 and Jørgen Sørensen took over the position until he died in 1944. He was replaced by Theo Schütze who had entered the board when August Clausen had retired.

In the interwar period the company failed to modernize and by the 1950s sales faltered. In an attempt to recover the company invested heavily in new machinery and cut the workforce to 200 workers. It didn't save the company and in 1967 it was liquidated and merged with the company Rønning & Co. The production of a type of chocolate-coated marshmallow treats had proven so successful it was decided to continue production of them. The company moved to the Aarhus suburb Hasselager in 1967 but when the factory burned down in 1985 production was moved to Skanderborg where it remains today.
