= Christian Frühstück Nielsen =

Danish architect

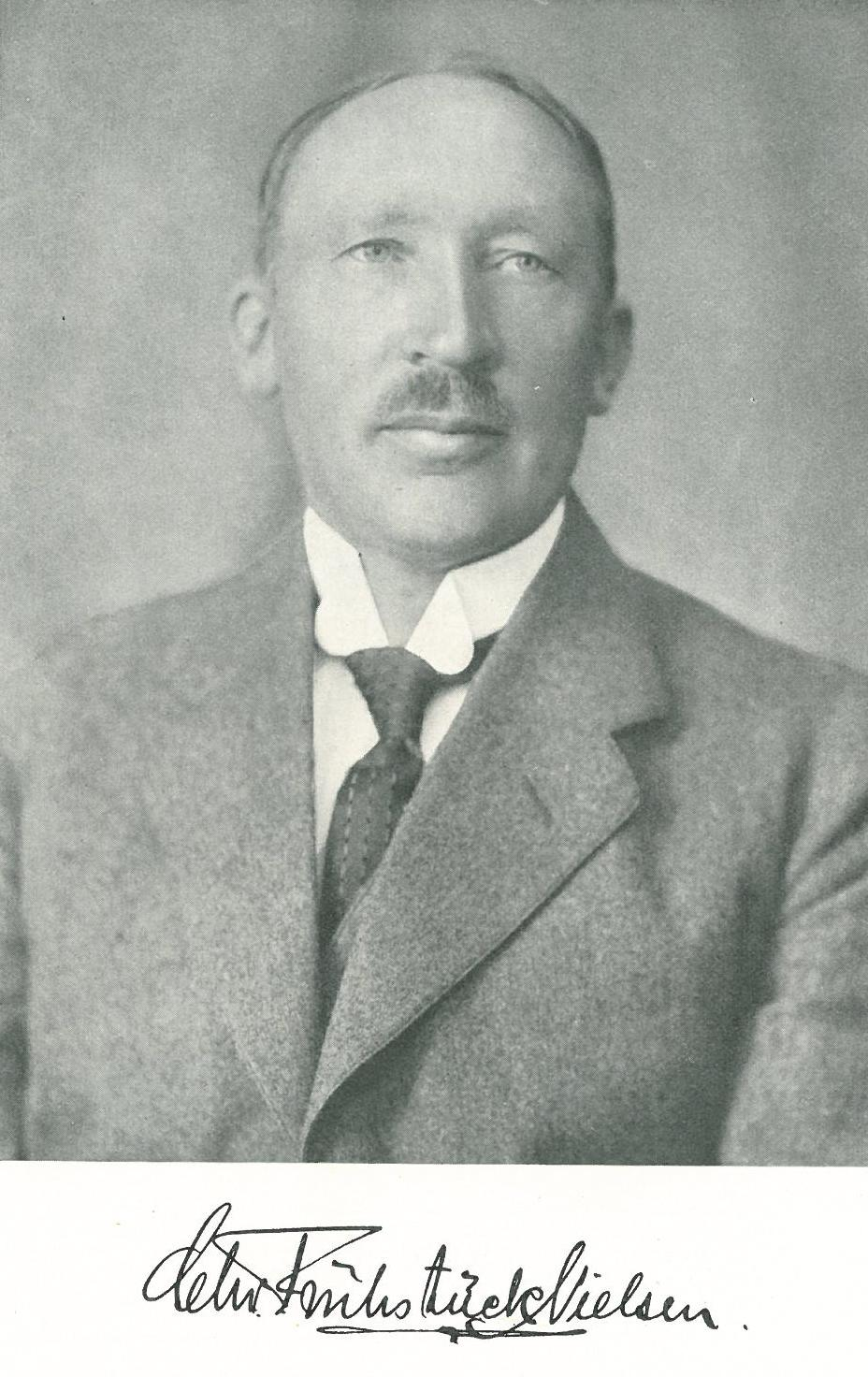
- Christian Frühstück Nielsen, before 1922
- Born: 7 August 1878; Aarhus, Denmark
- Died: 3 January 1956 (aged 77); Aarhus, Denmark
- Education: Royal Danish Academy of Fine Arts
- Occupation: Architect

Christian Frühstück Nielsen was a Danish architect born in Aarhus, Denmark on 7 August 1878. Frühstück Nielsen primarily worked in and around Aarhus and on Mors where he left numerous lasting works.

Frühstück Nielsen's parents were the master mason Christian Julius Nielsen and Jakobine Bach. In 1898 he graduated from Technical School and between 1900 and 1907 he attended the architecture school at the Royal Danish Academy of Fine Arts in Copenhagen from where he graduated with a degree in architecture.

He found employment at Vilhelm Dahlerup, the City Architect of Copenhagen Axel Møller and Martin Borch. From 1908 he had his own architect's practice in Aarhus. He was chairman of the Association of Byggeinteresserede in 1921–46, member of Tilsynsrådet for Jydske Hypotekforeninger, Bygningskommisionen i Aarhus and the board of Architects' Association of Denmark in two different periods.

Christian Frühstück Nielsen was married to Karen Elisabeth Hansen on 17 May 1919 in Copenhagen and died on 3 January 1956 in Aarhus.

== Works ==
Villas in the Aarhus area:

- Marselisvej 19 (1909)
- Strandvænget 2 (1915)
- Silkeborgvej 30 (1923)
- Paludan Müllersvej 10 (1931)
- Johan Langesvej 7 (1938)

Residential buildings in Aarhus:

- Pontoppidansgade 16 (1909)
- Skolegade 30 (1911)
- Skolebakken 5 (1913)
- Nørregade 53–55 (1913)
- Borgporten (1915)
- Borggade 10-12- 14 (1933)

Factory buildings:

- Chocolate factory Elvirasminde, Klostergade 32–34, Aarhus (1912)
- United Ironworks, Knudrisgade 7, Aarhus (1916)
- Administration- and factory building for N.A. Christensen & Co., Nykøbing Mors (1913)

Other buildings:

- Apotek i Vils, Mors (1904)
- School in Hadsten (1915)
- Pharmacy in Stoholm (1915)
- Rectory in Mørke (1922)
- Rectory in Lading (1925)
- Cemetery chapel, Nykøbing Mors (1925)
- Expansion of Morsø Bank (1925)
- Christian X and Queen Alexandrine's Stiftelse, Åboulevarden 1, Aarhus (1926)
- Pharmacy, Nykøbing Mors (1925)
- Brabrand Retirement home (1939)
- Nursery, Charlottehøj, Aarhus (1948)
- Memorial park in Aarhus for Danes abroad (1923)

== External references ==
- Christian Frühstück Nielsen on Wikimedia commons
