= Heidi Chocolat AG, Niemetz Schwedenbomben =

Austrian confectionery manufacturer

- Founded: 1930
- Headquarters: Vienna
- Key people: Bernhard Kletzmair
- Revenue: 18 mil. EUR (2018)
- Number of employees: 180 (2018)

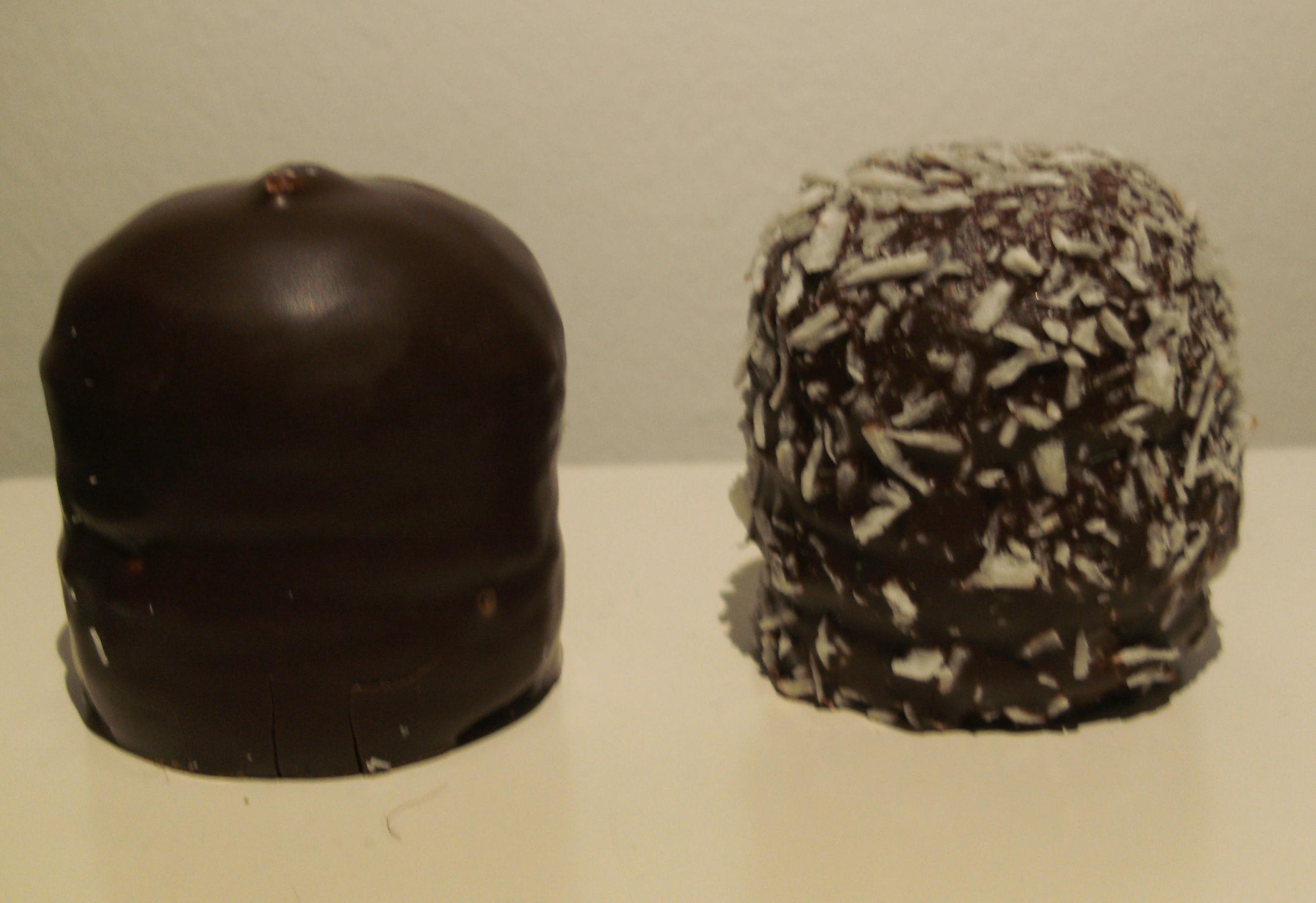
Niemetz Schwedenbomben

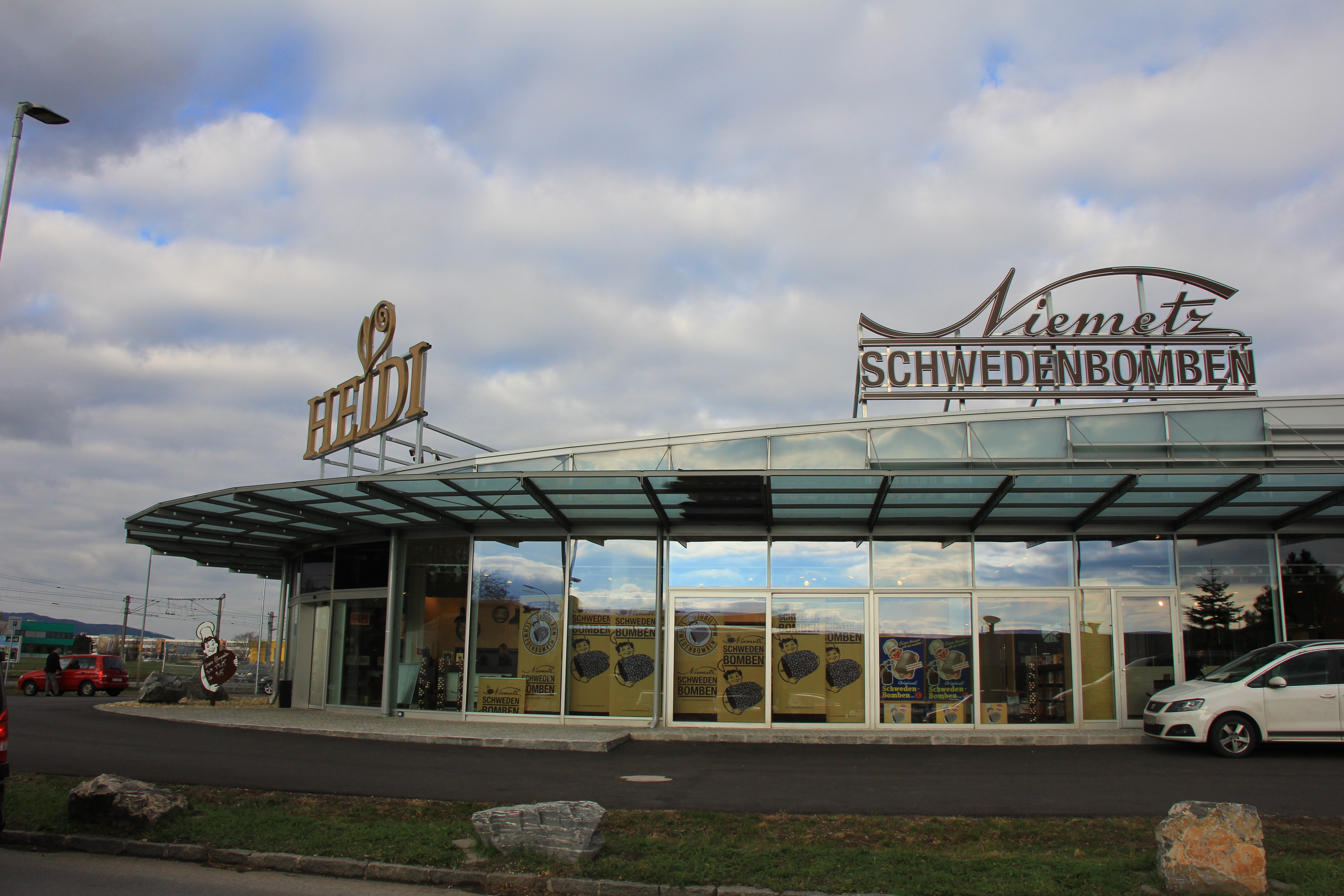
Plant in the Industriezentrum Niederösterreich Süd (industrial centre lower south Austria, November 2015)

Heidi Chocolat AG, Niemetz Schwedenbomben, formerly Walter Niemetz Süßwarenfabrik – Fabrikation von Zucker-, Schokolade-, Konditorei- und Dauerbackwaren GmbH & Co KG is an Austrian confectionery manufacturer.

The company, also known as Walter Niemetz Süßwarenmanufaktur (Walter Niemetz Sweets Manufactory), goes back to a café-confectionery founded by Edmund Niemetz in Linz in 1890 - a time when Viennese coffeehouses were emerging. In May 2013, the production was sold to the Swiss Heidi Chocolat AG, which is an indirect subsidiary of the Austrian Meinl-Gruppe via the Romanian holding company KEX Confectionery.

Niemetz is best known in Austria for producing Schwedenbomben (chocolate marshmallows, lit. Swedenbomb), Manja (hazelnut cream bars with a cocoa-based fat glaze) and Swedy (peanut cream bars with a cocoa-based fat glaze). They are only produced in Wiener Neudorf and the products are sold in almost all European countries. The former Niemetz Konditorei-Café Linz pastry shop operated with a branch on the corner of Fadingerstrasse and Mozartstrasse until 2015. Until 2019 there was a branch in Salzburg, the Niemetz Konditorei-Café Salzburg at the Herbert-von-Karajan-Platz 11.

== History ==
Edmund Niemetz's son, Walter Niemetz, founded the factory in Vienna-Landstrasse in 1930. In 1926, Walter Niemetz and his wife Johanna created the Schwedenbombe.

At the beginning of January 1940, the Walter Niemetz Süßwarenfabrik – Fabrikation von Zucker-, Schokolade-, Konditorei- und Dauerbackwaren OHG was founded.

In 1985, Ursula Niemetz, the daughter of the company founder Walter Niemetz, opened the pastry cafe W. u. J. Niemetz zur Pferdeschwemme in Salzburg. In 1989, she went to New York and opened a branch there to sell frozen confectionery.

After her father died in 1992, Ursula Niemetz returned to Vienna and took over the family business with her partner, Steve A. Batchelor. Ursula Niemetz holds 80 percent of the company.

In 2012, the company ran into such serious financial difficulties that it could no longer pay its employees wages. Shortly before the turn of the year, the tax office filed for bankruptcy due to tax debts when Niemetz submitted a restructuring plan. The company initially presented a restructuring plan with a cash quota of 20% for creditors, payable in two years. Still, it then increased the offer to a cash quota of 75% initially and finally 95%, probably because there were numerous interested buyers (among other Manner and Confiserie Heindl). To do this, the company would have had to raise money to almost the entire company debt of 4.2 million euros. Since this was not possible by the deadline of May 21, 2012, bankruptcy proceedings were opened. Shortly afterward, on 22 May, Heidi Chocolat acquired the insolvent estate for allegedly 5.25 million euros.

After the purchase, Heidi Chocolat AG moved to Wiener Neudorf in the Industriezentrum Niederösterreich Süd (Industrial centre in lower south Austria), where production has been taking place since 2016. In 2016, 100 employees worked at the company.

A legal dispute arose over using the name Niemetz, which the company founder's daughter, Ursula Niemetz, wanted to continue using. Heidi Chocolat said they purchased all tangible and intangible assets in this regard.

At the beginning of 2017, Heidi Chocolat bought the chocolate manufacturer Schwermer Dietrich Stiel and converted it into an independent subsidiary.

In 2017, comprehensive research into the ownership structure of Heidi Chocolat AG was published. It was revealed that an elaborate box construction was used to conceal the ownership structure via subcontractors on the Cayman Islands and Malta. This became known through the Paradise Papers.

In May 2022, CEO Gerhard Schaller was, due to a corruption scandal involving his wife Sophie Karmasin, replaced by Bernhard Kletzmair. Schaller had headed the company since 2014.

At the end of 2022, the company closed the Lucerne location in Switzerland, and parts of the production were taken over by Aeschbach Chocolatier AG. According to Heidi Chocolat, the reason for the closure were high energy prices as well as price increases in other areas.
