= Valomilk =

American marshmallow cream–filled chocolate

Valomilk

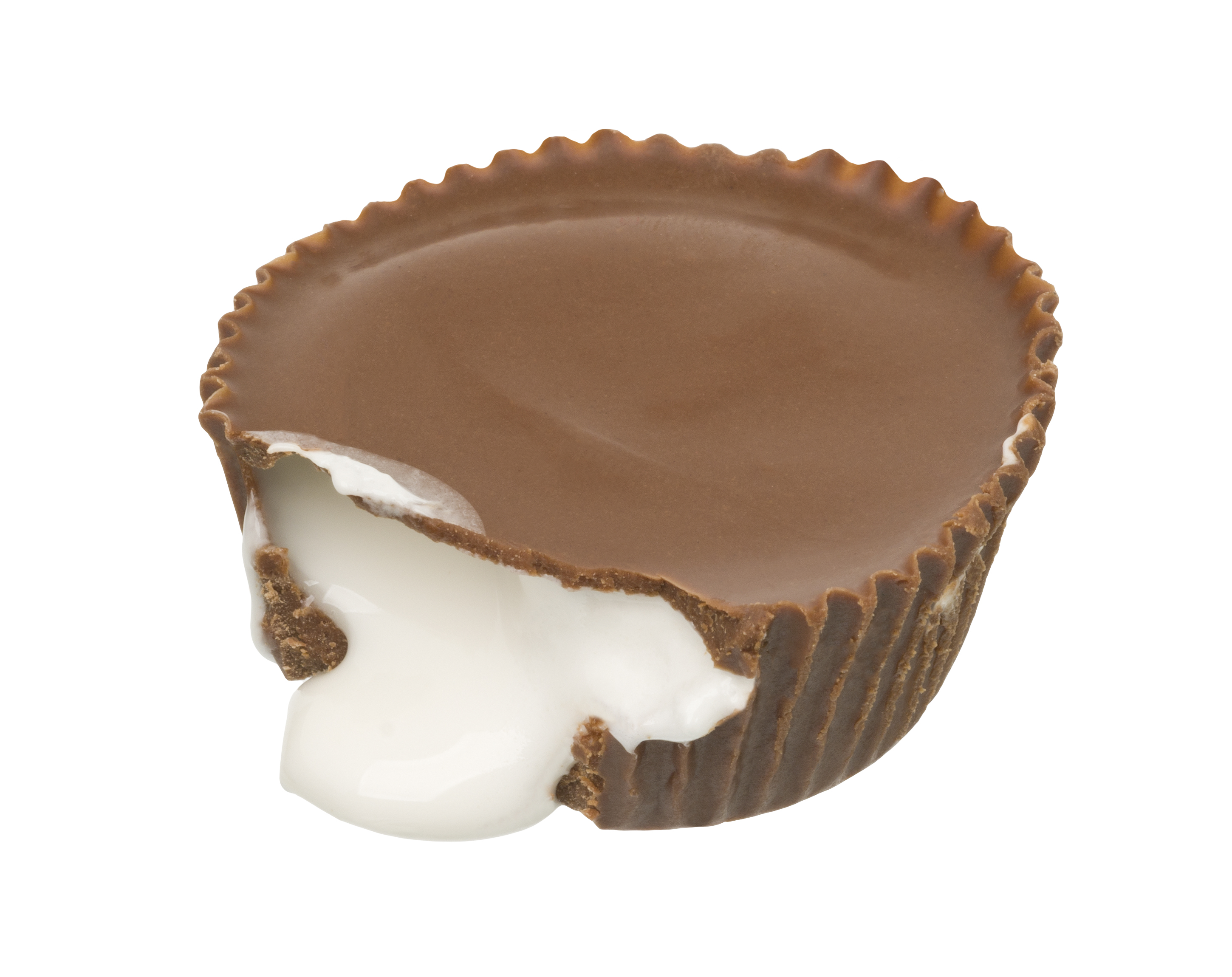
A Valomilk cup split

Valomilk is a marshmallow cream–filled milk chocolate cup confection manufactured by Russell Sifers Candies in Merriam, Kansas.

== History ==
Valomilks were first created in 1931 when a candymaker at Sifers, then located in Kansas City, added too much vanilla extract to a batch of marshmallows, which never set. The semi-liquid mixture was then used for a filling in one-ounce milk-chocolate cups, the kind traditionally filled with peanut butter.

The name Valomilk represents the three ingredients: vanilla, marshmallow, and milk chocolate.

The fifth generation of the Sifers family still uses the original family recipe along with much of the original equipment. Valomilks are currently the only candy still made by the Sifers company, which discontinued its general product lines in the 1950s.

== State disk promotion ==
In the late 1950s, Valomilk launched a promotion to celebrate the admission of Alaska and Hawaii to the Union. Cardboard disks with the names of the capitals of all 50 states of America were placed on top of the candy cups and shipped to stores. Anyone who collected 30 of the disks could send them in to the Valomilk candy company and receive a tube of 10 free Valomilks.

== See also ==
- Chocolate-coated marshmallow treats
