= Gandour =

Food processing company

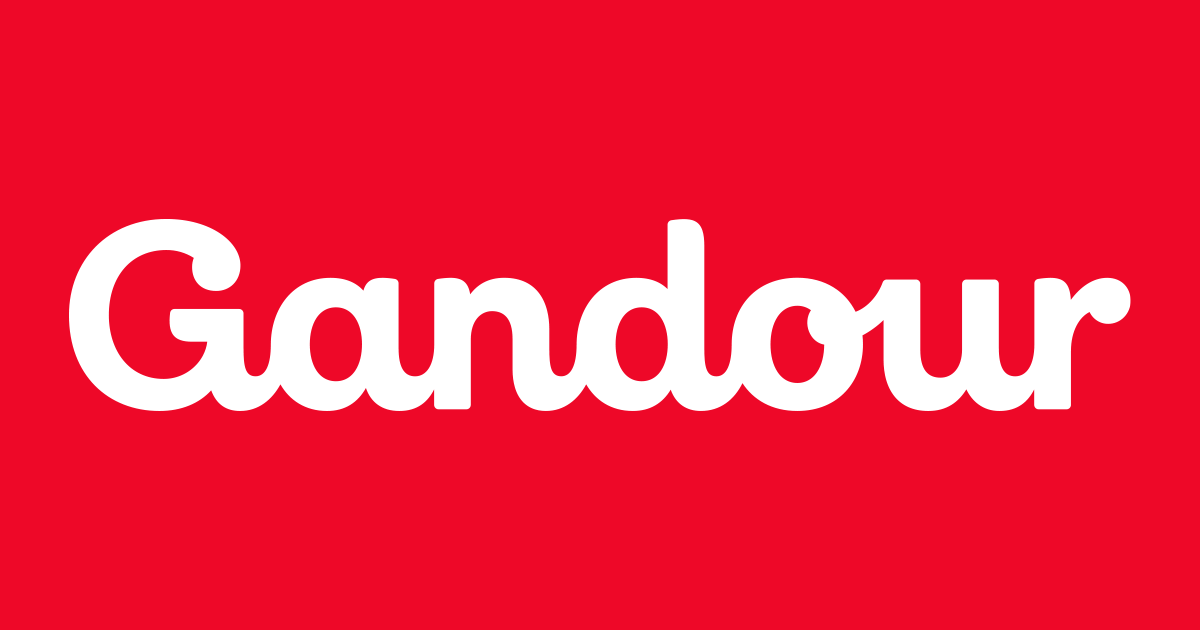
- Trade name: Gandour
- Native name: غندور
- Company type: Private
- Industry: Food processing
- Founded: 1857; 169 years ago in Beirut, Lebanon
- Headquarters: Jeddah, Saudi Arabia
- Area served: Gulf Cooperation Council: Middle East and North Africa: South Asia
- Key people: Rafic A. Ghandour (CEO); Ali R. Ghandour (chairman)
- Products: Confectionery, Bakeries, Snacks, Chocolate, Oils & Chewing gums
- Revenue: ▲$150 million
- Divisions: Saudi Chewing Gum Production Company, Saudi Arabia; Al Jazeera Food Processing, Saudi Arabia; MAJ Food Distribution Systems, Saudi Arabia; Gandour India Food Processing Pvt. Ltd., India; M. O. Gandour & Sons, Lebanon; Advance Food Industries, Egypt; Gandour Philippines Inc., Philippines
- Website: gandour.com

Gandour (Arabic: غندور) is a food processing company founded in Beirut, Lebanon in 1857, with headquarters in Jeddah, Saudi Arabia.

A manufacturer of confectioneries like hard-boiled candies, the company started industrial level production in 1912, before expanding its operations to Saudi Arabia in 1956. Gandour is widely regarded as the first chocolate and chewing gum manufacturer in Saudi Arabia.

Currently, Gandour has manufacturing facilities in Saudi Arabia, Egypt, Lebanon, and India, and serves the area of the Middle East, North Africa and Southeast Asia.
