= Chocolate fish =

Confectionery popular in New Zealand

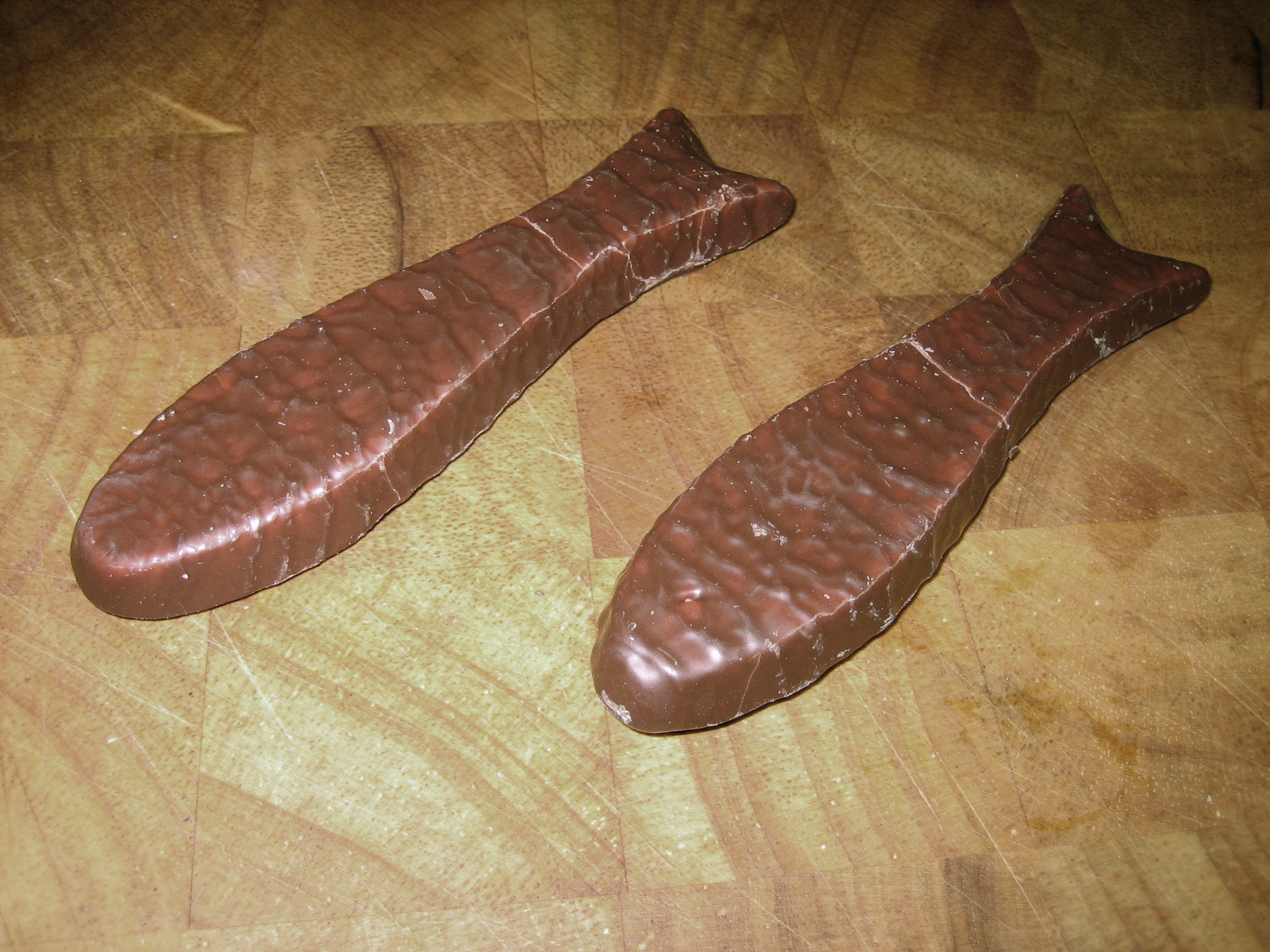
- Two chocolate fish
- Type: Confectionery
- Place of origin: New Zealand
- Main ingredients: Pink or white marshmallow, milk chocolate

A chocolate fish or choccy fish is a traditional confectionery item in New Zealand. In New Zealand culture, it is a common reward for a job done well ("Give that kid a chocolate fish").

Chocolate fish have a conventional fish-shape and a length of 5 to 8 centimetres (2.0 to 3.1 in). They are made of pink or white marshmallow covered in a thin layer of milk chocolate. The ripples or "scales" on the fish are created simply by the fish moving under a blower; this slides the unset chocolate back, creating the illusion of scales on the fish.

Several manufacturers make the fish; the most well-recognised is Cadbury. Smaller, or "fun-sized" variants of the chocolate fish are colloquially referred to as "sprats". Variants of the traditional item exist; a common version is made of solid orange-flavoured milk chocolate.

== History ==
Chocolate fish have been made since at least 1903, though early varieties may not have included marshmallow. Marshmallow-based chocolate fish were being produced in Dunedin in 1937. For a short period in the late 1990s to early 2000s, Tip Top sold a chocolate fish ice-cream. In 2019, the chocolate fish was added to the Cadbury Favourites box.

In 1970, Ron Barclay, Member of Parliament for New Plymouth, asked a question in Parliament about the price of chocolate fish. In 1996 a "Great New Zealand Cadbury Chocolate Fish Day" was created in May to support the Child Safety Foundation of New Zealand and the Cystic Fibrosis Association of New Zealand.

Cadbury stopped producing 20g chocolate fish in 2023, stating that they had become less popular with consumers. They continued to include 'sprats' in Favourites boxes. As of 2024, local company Queen Anne produces a 50g fish and 14g fish that it calls 'fish bites', and other companies also sell variations.
