= Church window (dessert) =

Multicolored dessert confection

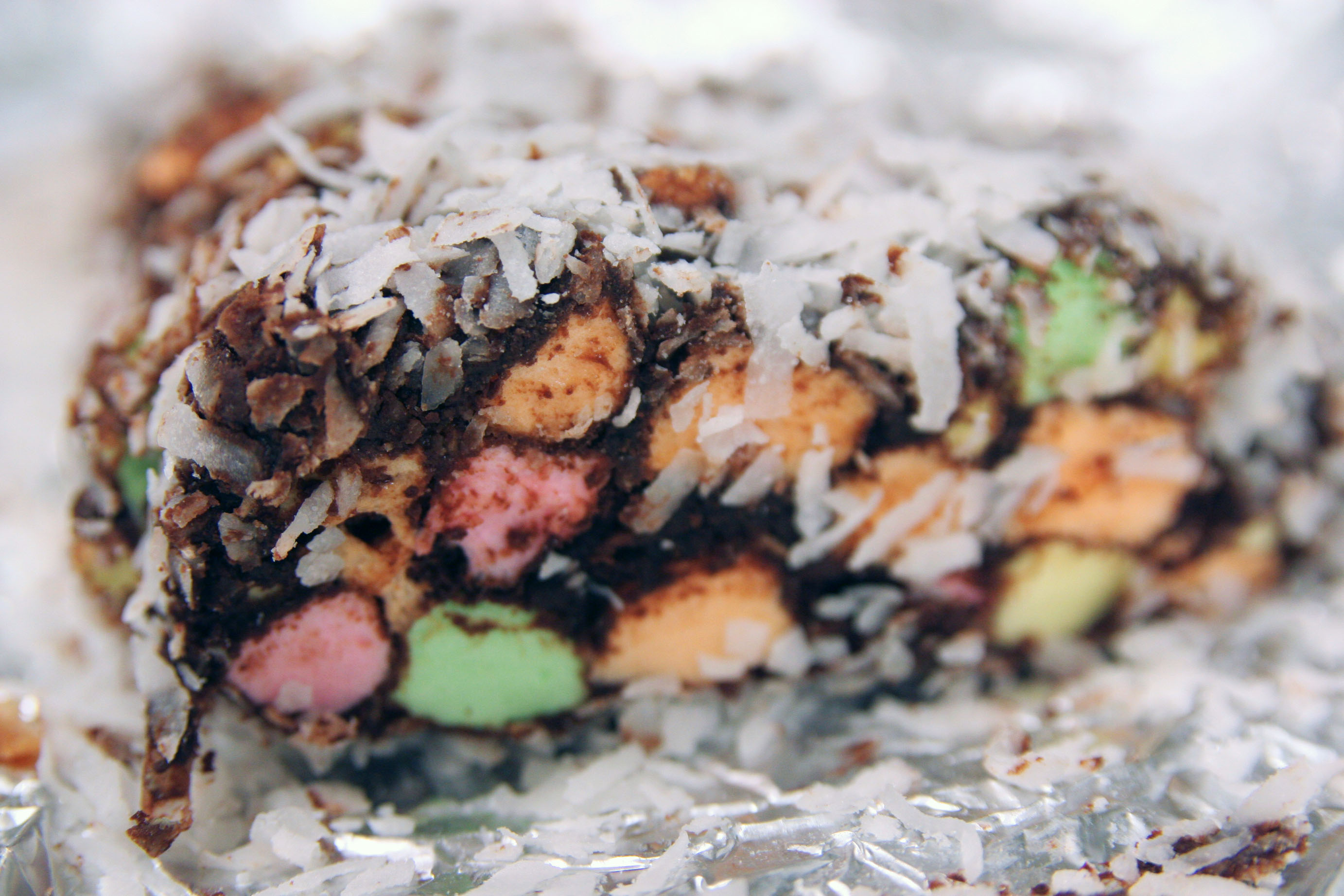
Church windows dessert

Church windows, also referred to as chocolate marshmallow logs, stained glass windows or cathedral windows, are a multicolored dessert confection, popular in the United States. Ingredients include chocolate, butter, nuts (often walnuts or pecans), mini-colored marshmallows and shredded coconut.

== See also ==
- Coconut candy
- Rocky Road
