= Klostergade =

Street in Aarhus, Denmark

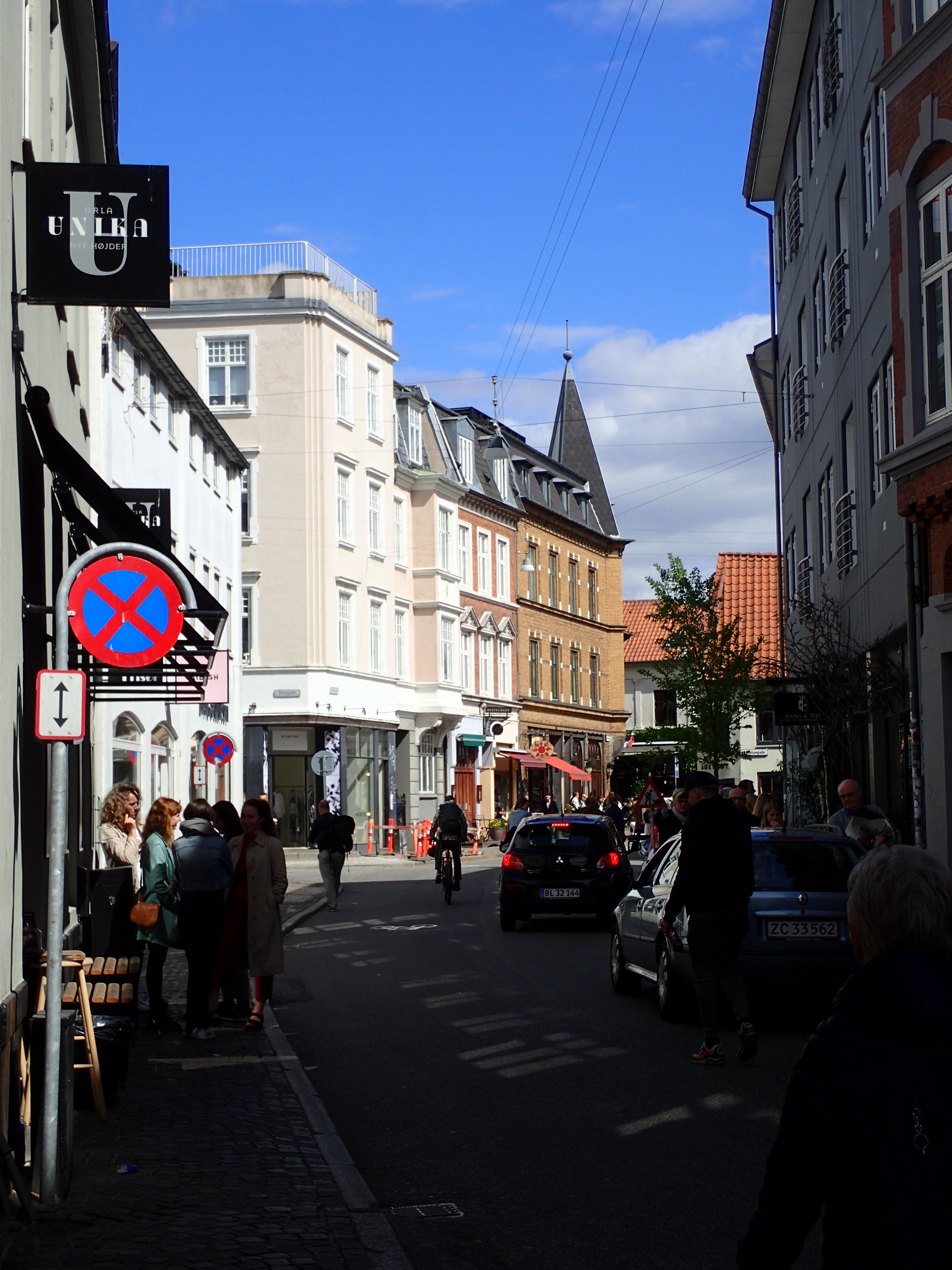
- Klostergade in Aarhus
- Former name(s): 1300: Apud fratres 1562: Bag Klosteret; 1797: Skidenstræde (Partial)
- Length: 429 m (1,407 ft)
- Location: Vesterbro, Aarhus, Denmark
- Postal code: 8000
- Coordinates: 56°09′31.9″N 10°12′21.2″E

Klostergade (lit.: Priory-street) is a street in Aarhus which runs east from Grønnegade to Studsgade, intersecting a number of streets.

Klostergade is an old street, situated in the Vesterbro neighborhood and its eastern section enters the smaller Latin Quarter. Klostergade is home to two listed buildings and the historic Our Lady's Priory. Klotergade is a typical medieval street; narrow and curvy. Many small shops, cafés and restaurants are situated here and the nearby square Klostertorv is popular with recreational activities and an important event venue.

== History ==
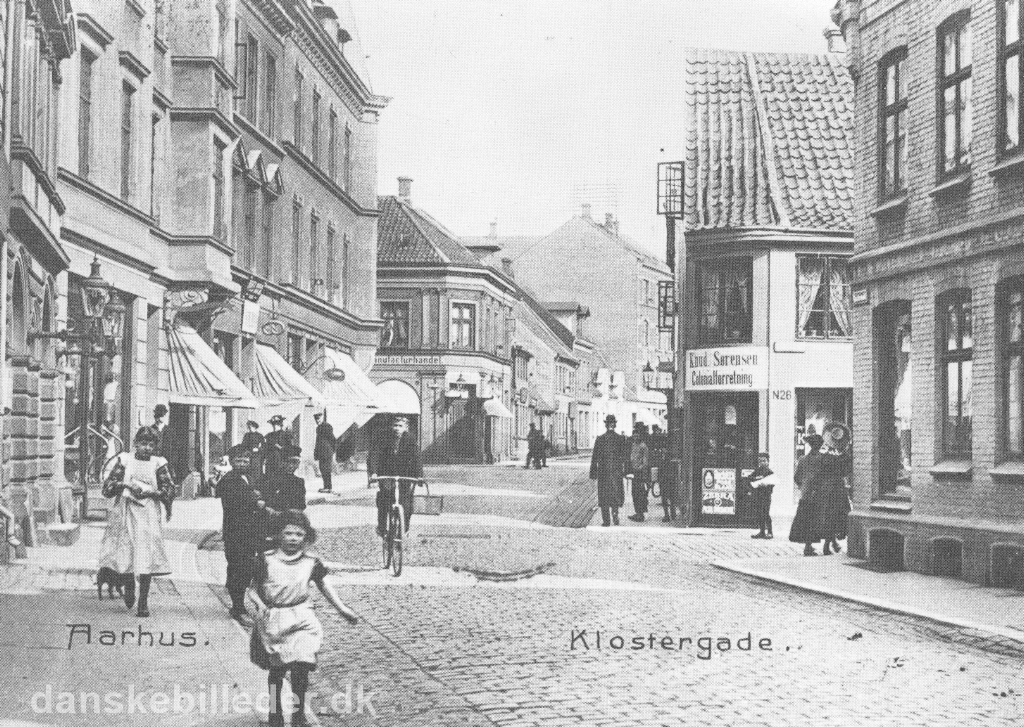
Klostergade in 1905

The street has existed since at least the 1300s when it was known by the Latin phrase Apud fratres (Behind the convent). The name references Our Lady's Priory which is situated on the street and was established no later than 1240. In 1562 the street had become known as Bag Klosteret, the Danish equivalent of the original Latin phrase. The stream Borrebækken ran through Klostergade to Studsgade where it united with a stream from Vennelystparken.

Klostergade was constructed as an extension of the short street of Graven, running north of the priory and it originally terminated at Munkegade, where the road to Randers began. Until the 1800s, Klostergade was the north-most street in the city. Behind the gardens was the city wall and the "road behind the city" which is today Nørre Allé. The significance of Klostergade as a thoroughfare was diminished at an early time when a new road from Studsgade to Christiansbjerg was established in 1757 and most traffic from Randers went to the city gate in Studsgade. When Nørre Allé was widened and paved, even more traffic bypassed Klostergade.

Initially the western section of Klostergade and the southern section of Grønnegade was known as Skidenstræde (Lit.: Shit-alley). In 1830 Skidenstræde became part of Grønnegade until 1909 when the southern section of Grønnegade was made a part of Klostergade.

== Buildings ==
Klostergade gets its name from Our Lady's Priory which is situated on the street. The priory was established by the Dominican order some time in the 1220-30s on the site of the original St. Nicolas cathedral. The cathedral was torn down in stages and the priory built in its stead. Beneath the priory lies a crypt church from the cathedral which may be the oldest stone church in Scandinavia. Behind the priory on Vestergade lies the Church of Our Lady.

Directly across the street from the priory is two listed buildings from 1685 and 1777. The 1685 complex is a half-timbered structure with a building facing the street, another wing behind it from the 1700s and a basement from the late Middle Ages. The other listing is a 3-winged estate with a renaissance building from 1812 facing the street and an older half-timbered house from 1777 behind it.

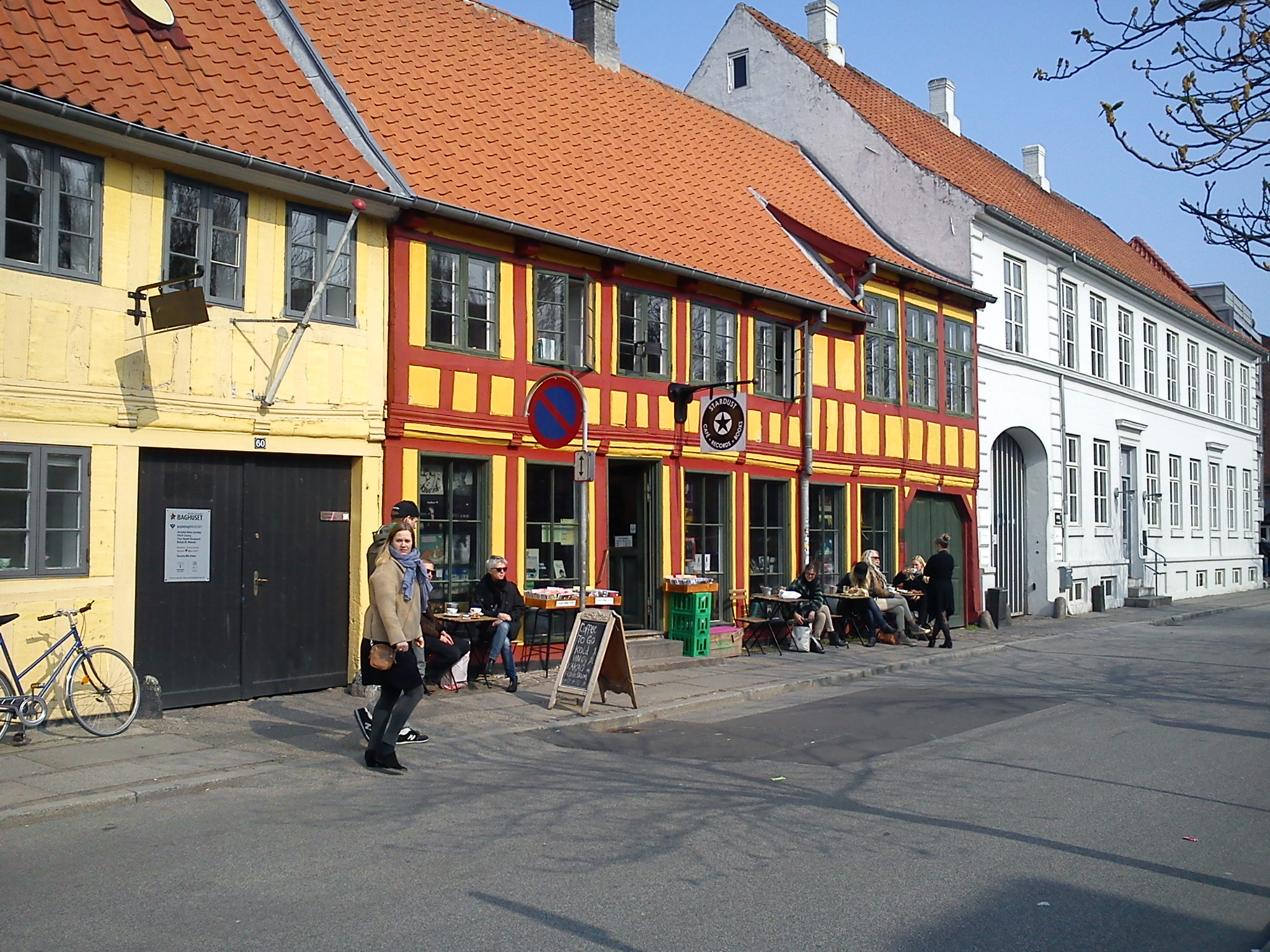
Several old listed buildings

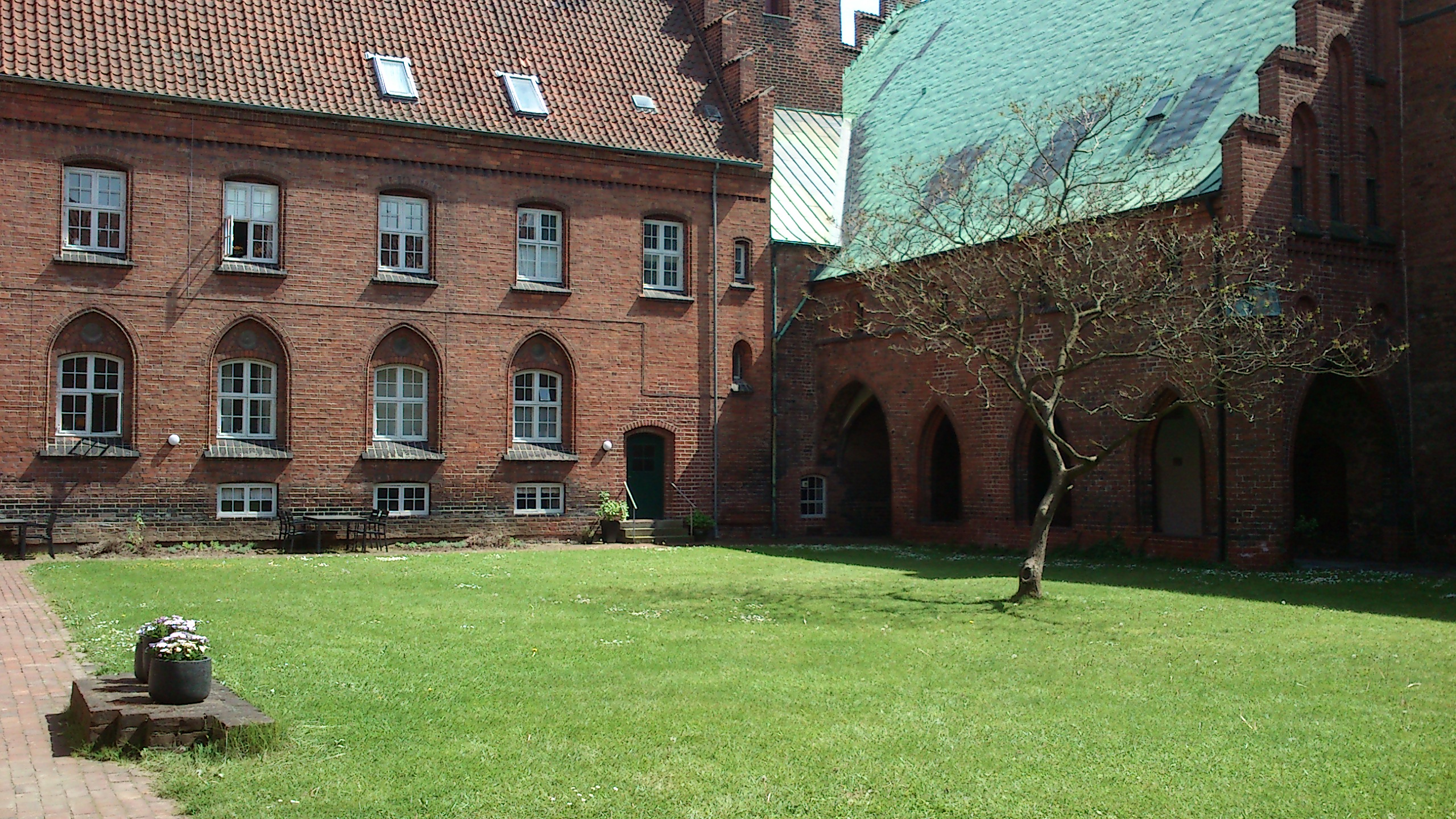
The (former) priory attached to the Church of Our Lady has official address at Klostergade.

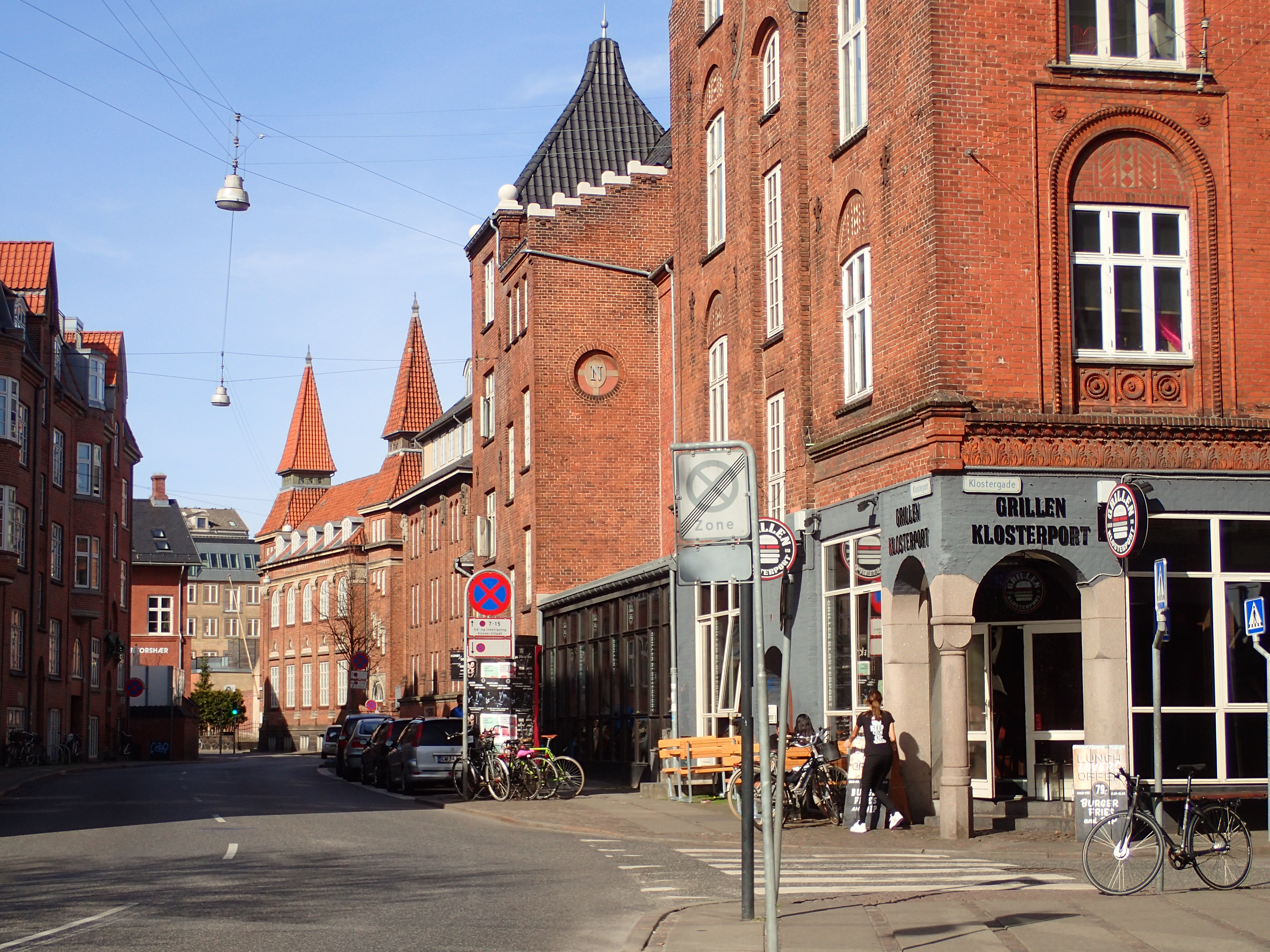
Klostergade intersects with Klosterport

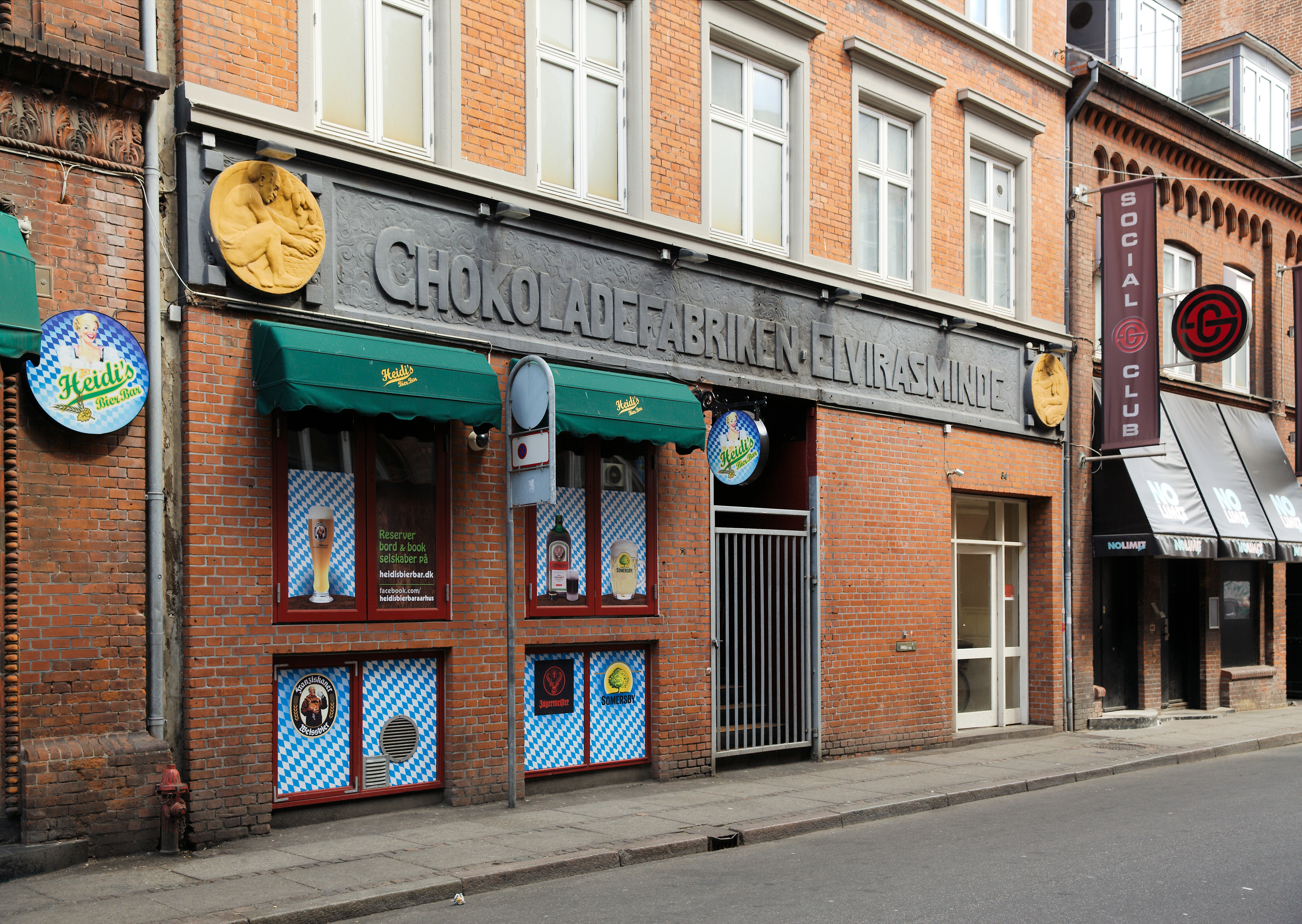
A former Chocolate factory

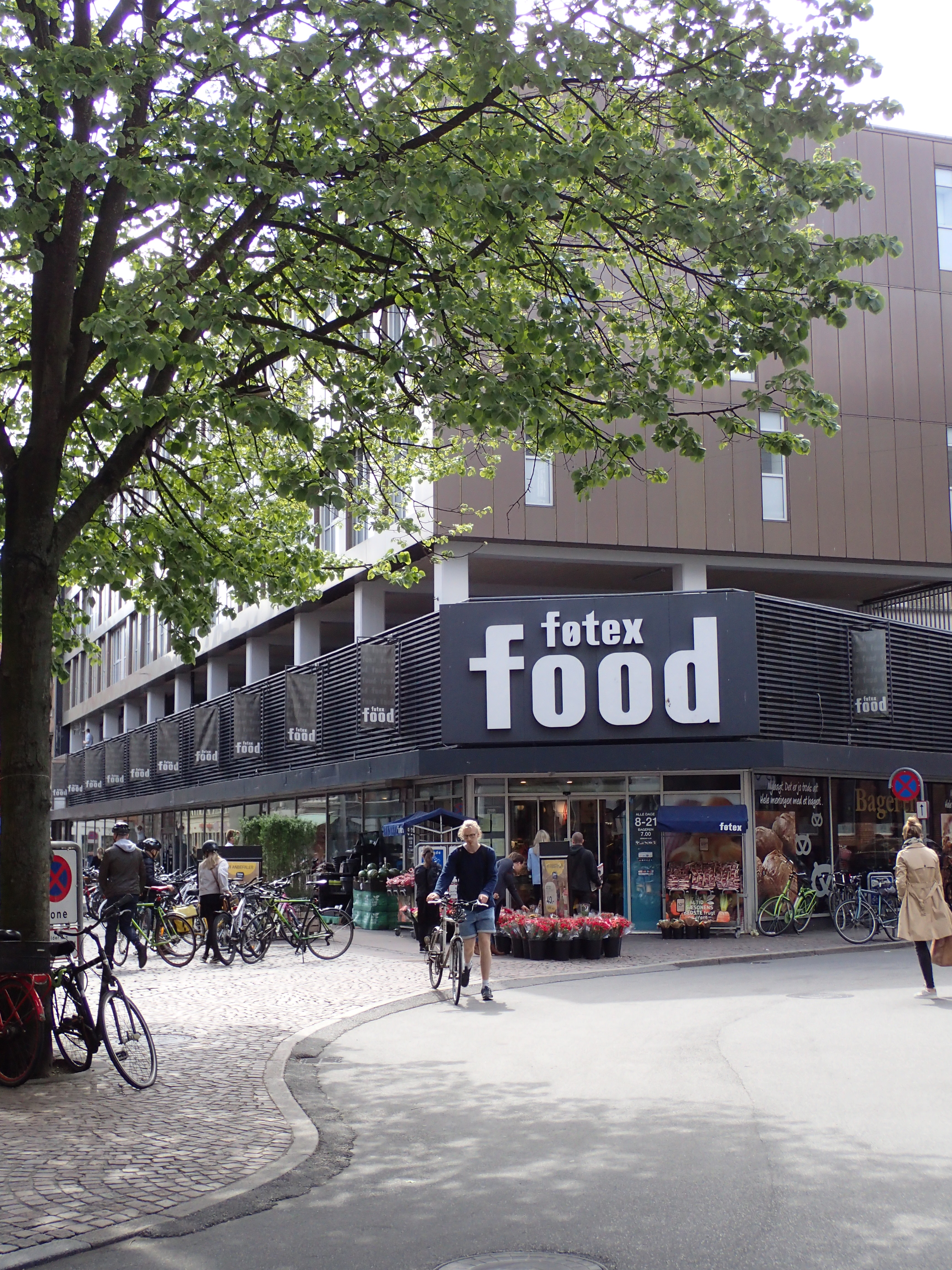
The first supermarket in Denmark from 1960

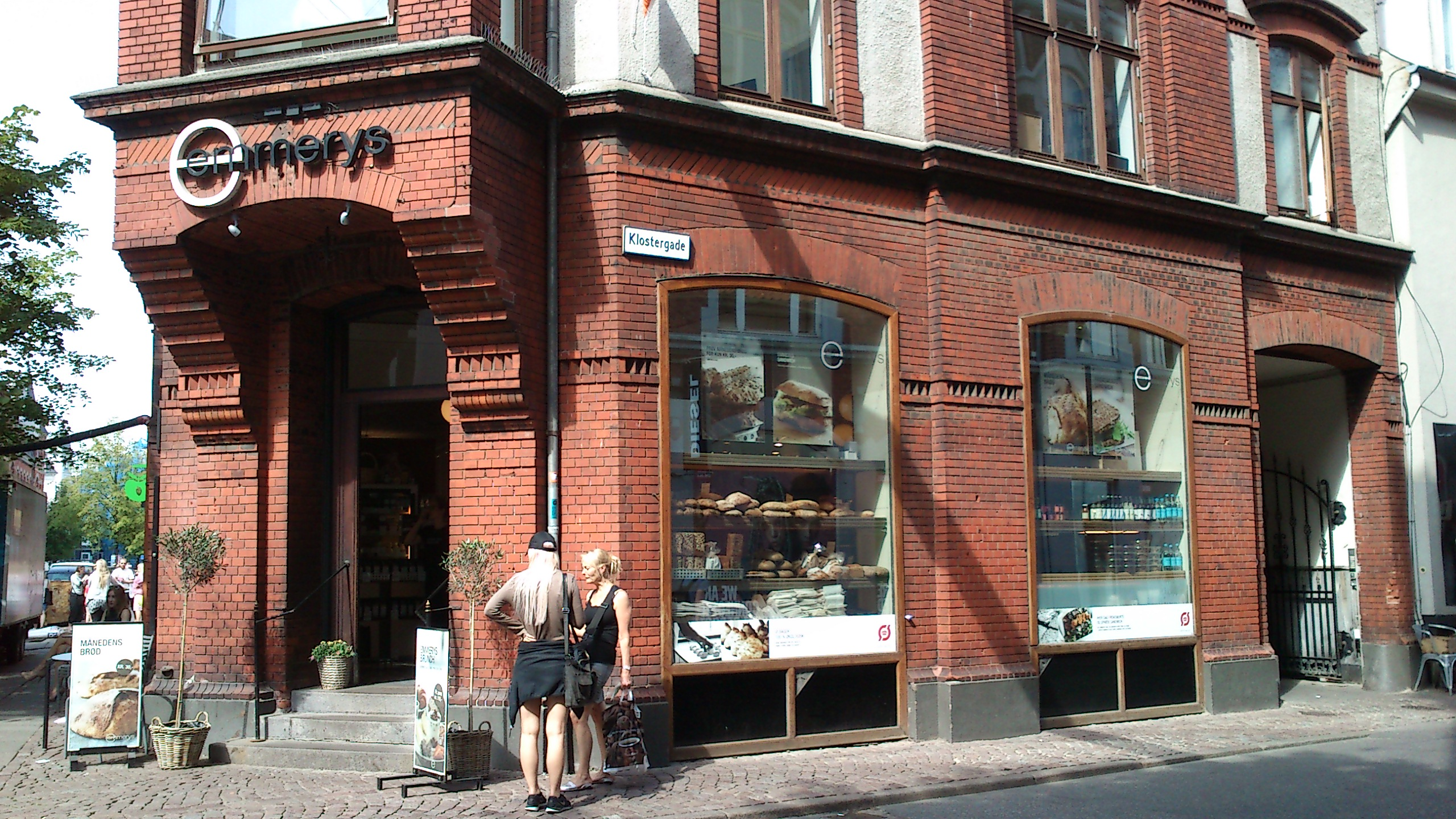
The original store of Emmerys (1918), a Danish chain of organic bakeries.

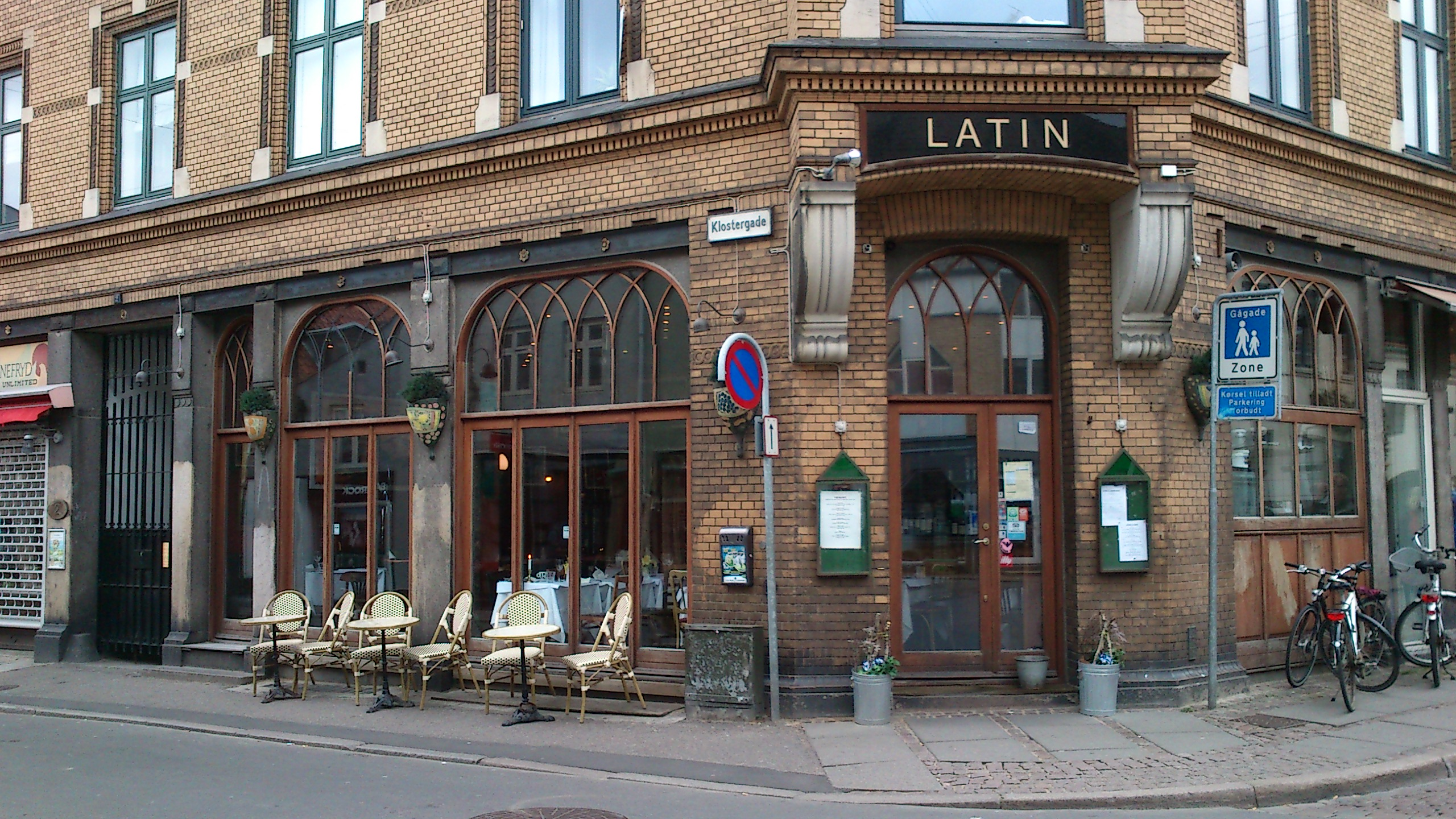
One of several restaurants

== Flora ==
Inspired by an old chestnut tree in the priory gardens two rows of Aesculus hippocastanum chestnuts were planted around the parking area on Klostergade. On the square Klostertorv an Acer platanoides maple was planted around the turn of the 20th century in a courtyard. The buildings around it has since been torn down and the area turned into a large open square. In 1973 a small square on the corner of Badstuegade was established with 3 lime trees, Tilia cordata.
