= Bakal =

Bakal may refer to:

== Places ==
- Bakal, Bangladesh, a village in the Barisal Division of Bangladesh
- Bakal, Gao Region, a village in Gao Region, Mali
- Bakal, Russia, a town in Satkinsky District of Chelyabinsk Oblast, Russia
- Pakal, Markazi, a village in Markazi Province, Iran, alternately spelled Bākal
- Bakal mine, an iron mine in Chelyabinsk Oblast, Russia
- Bakal Lake, a lake in Crimea
- Bakal Spit, a spit in northwestern Crimea

== People ==
- Aleksandar Bakal (1929–1997), Croatian architect
- Abdul Hamid Bakal (1939–2024), Bruneian aristocrat and Muslim scholar
- Boris Bakal, Croatian artist
- Inbar Bakal, Israeli singer and songwriter
- Sylvia Young, born Sylvia Bakal (1939–2025), founder of Sylvia Young Theatre School in the UK

== Other uses ==
- Captain Bakal, a fictional character in Dragonlance

== See also ==
- Baykal (disambiguation)
- Bakaly
