= Bahcall =

Bahcall is a surname. Notable people with the name include:

- John N. Bahcall (1934–2005), American astrophysicist
- Neta Bahcall (born 1942), Israeli astrophysicist and cosmologist
- Safi Bahcall (born 1968), American technology executive and author

== See also ==
- Bacall (surname)
- Bakal (disambiguation)
