= Bacal =

Bacal is a surname. Notable people with the name include:

- Dumitru Bacal (born 1985), Moldovan footballer
- Jaime Gilinski Bacal (born 1957), Colombian banker
- Marthe Bacal (1931–2024), Romanian-French physicist

== See also ==
- Lauren Bacall (1924–2014), American actor, daughter of Natalie Bacal
- Bakal (disambiguation)
