= Baykal (disambiguation) =

Baykal, or Lake Baikal, is a lake in southern Siberia, Russia.

Baykal or Baikal may also refer to:

== Places ==
- Baykal, Belarus, a village in Vitsebsk Voblast
- Baykal, Bulgaria, a village in Dolna Mitropoliya Municipality of Pleven Province, Bulgaria
- Baykal, Russia, several rural localities in Russia
- Baykal, Çermik
- North Baikal Highlands, Buryatia, Russia
- Baikal Mountains, Irkutsk Oblast, Russia
- Pik Baikal, Buryatia, Russia

== Science, technology and engineering ==
- Baikal (rocket booster), a booster for Angara rocket
- Baikal bullfinch, a small passerine bird
- UZGA LMS-901 Baikal, a small passenger aircraft
- Baykal-class motorship, a class of Russian river passenger ships
- SS Baikal, an ice-breaking train ferry which operated in Lake Baikal
- Shuttle 2.01, a.k.a. "Baikal", an unfinished Soviet space shuttle
- Baikal CPU, Russian-made processors based on the ARM Cortex-A57
- Baikal, a brand of Makarov pistol
- Baïkal, a CalDAV and CardDAV server

== People with the given name ==
- Baykal Kulaksızoğlu (born 1983), Turkish Swiss footballer

== People with the surname ==
- Aysel Baykal (1939–2003), Turkish jurist, politician and former government minister
- Deniz Baykal (1938–2023), former leader of the Turkish Republican People's Party

== Other uses ==
- Baikal (drink), a Russian non-alcoholic drink
- Baikal Highway, a federal highway in Russia

== See also ==
- Baikal black grayling, a species of fish
- Baikal bush warbler, a species of bird
- Baycol, a brand name of cerivastatin
- Baykalsky (disambiguation)
