= Vita Cola =

Cola beverage produced in Germany

Vita-Cola

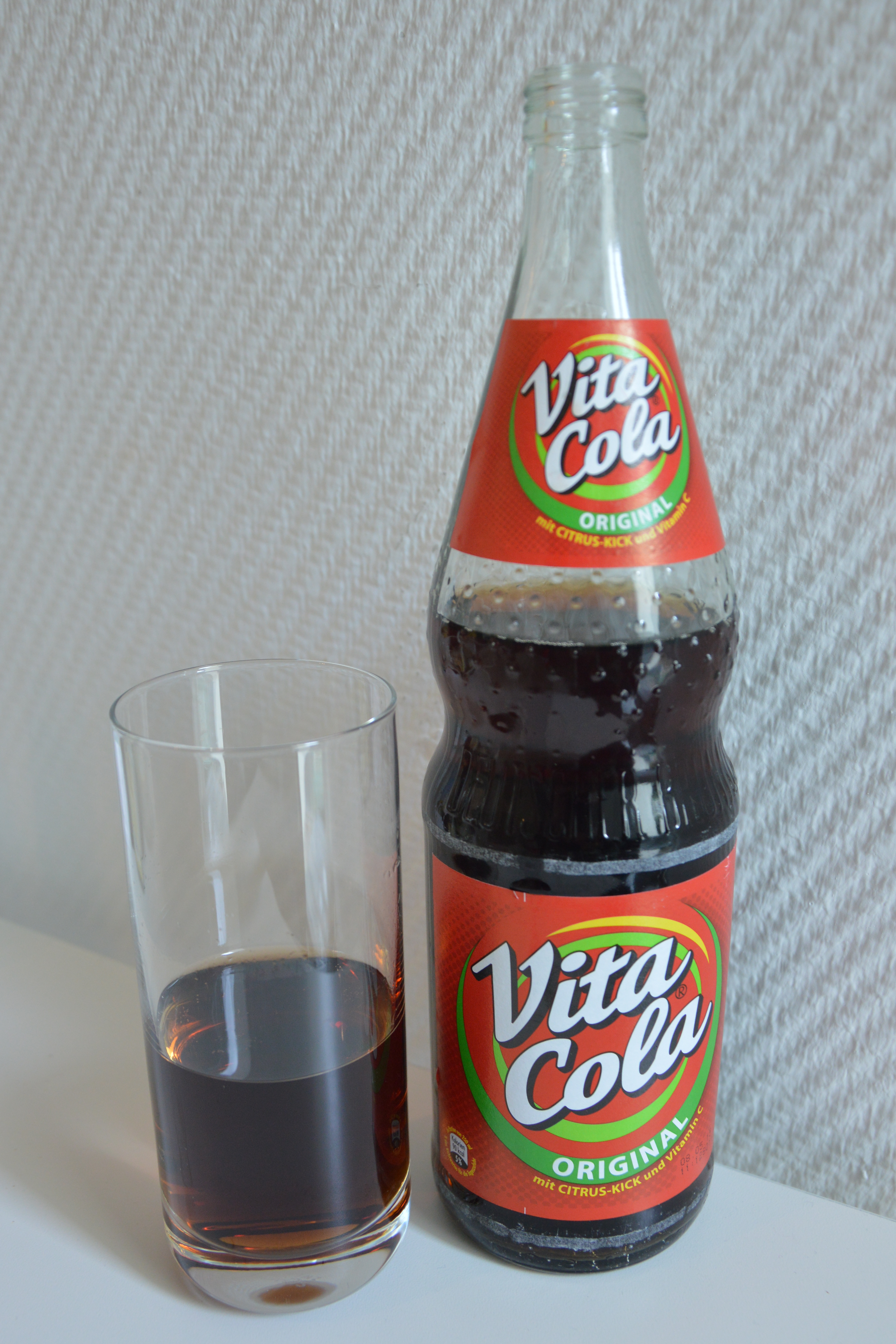
- Manufacturer: Thüringer Waldquell
- Origin: East Germany
- Introduced: 1957
- Flavour: Cola
- Website: www.vita-cola.de

Vita Cola is a German cola beverage that originated in East Germany. Vita Cola's flavor is described as cola-like with a strong note of lemon and fruit flavoring. It is also noticeably less sweet than Afri-Cola, Coca-Cola or Pepsi, and has a slightly thicker consistency due to its use of citrus and other aromatic oils in the formula.

== History and popularity ==
Vita Cola started out in the German Democratic Republic (GDR). Introduced in 1957, it was advertised as Brauselimonade mit Frucht- und Kräutergeschmack (carbonated soft drink with fruit and herb flavoring), using a formula that is still kept secret (similar to Coca-Cola's "Merchandise 7X" formula). At its peak, Vita Cola was bottled in over 200 factories.

After the fall of the Berlin Wall and Iron Curtain in 1989, Vita Cola's business quickly collapsed as Western cola brands took its place. However, with the advent of Ostalgie (nostalgia among East Germans for the "old days"), many former GDR products were brought back, Vita Cola being one of the most popular.

The company Thüringer Waldquell from Schmalkalden, Thuringia, secured the rights to the name and formula and began producing Vita Cola in 1994. From 2002 to 2005, Vita Cola sponsored FC Hansa Rostock, a soccer club from Mecklenburg-Vorpommern. Vita Cola has since then surpassed Pepsi Cola and is still regaining market share in the former East Germany.

In Thuringia, Vita Cola had the biggest market share of colas in 2009, even above Coca-Cola. That means that Thuringia is one of the few regions in the world where a regional cola brand is the market leader.

A 2019 news item stated that the product sold a record 89 million litres in 2018 "making it Germany’s most popular domestic cola".

There is another former East German cola brand in production: Club Cola.

== Ingredients ==
Natural mineral water, Sugar, Carbonic acid, Acidulants (E270, citric acid, phosphate), Dye E150 d, Natural aroma, Vitamin C, Caffeine.

== See also ==
- Culture of East Germany
- Club Cola
- Baikal (drink)
