= Club Cola =

Cola beverage produced in Germany

- Type: Soft drink
- Origin: East Germany
- Introduced: April 19, 1967; 59 years ago

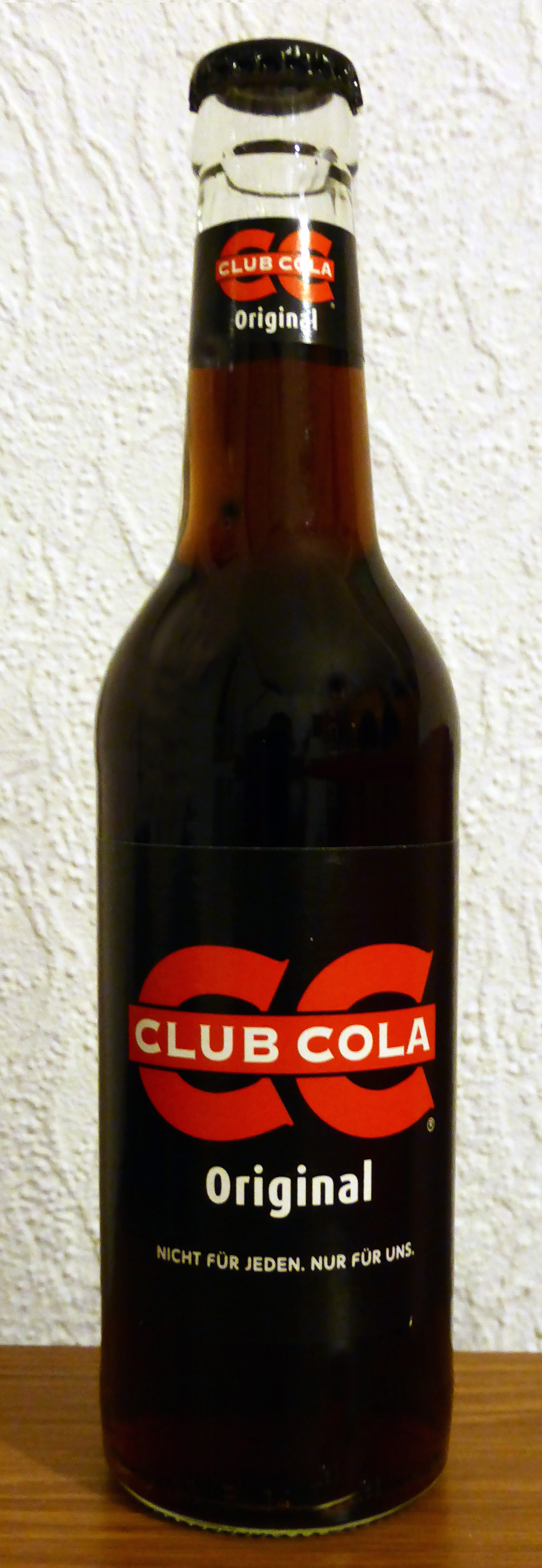
Club Cola bottle in 2014

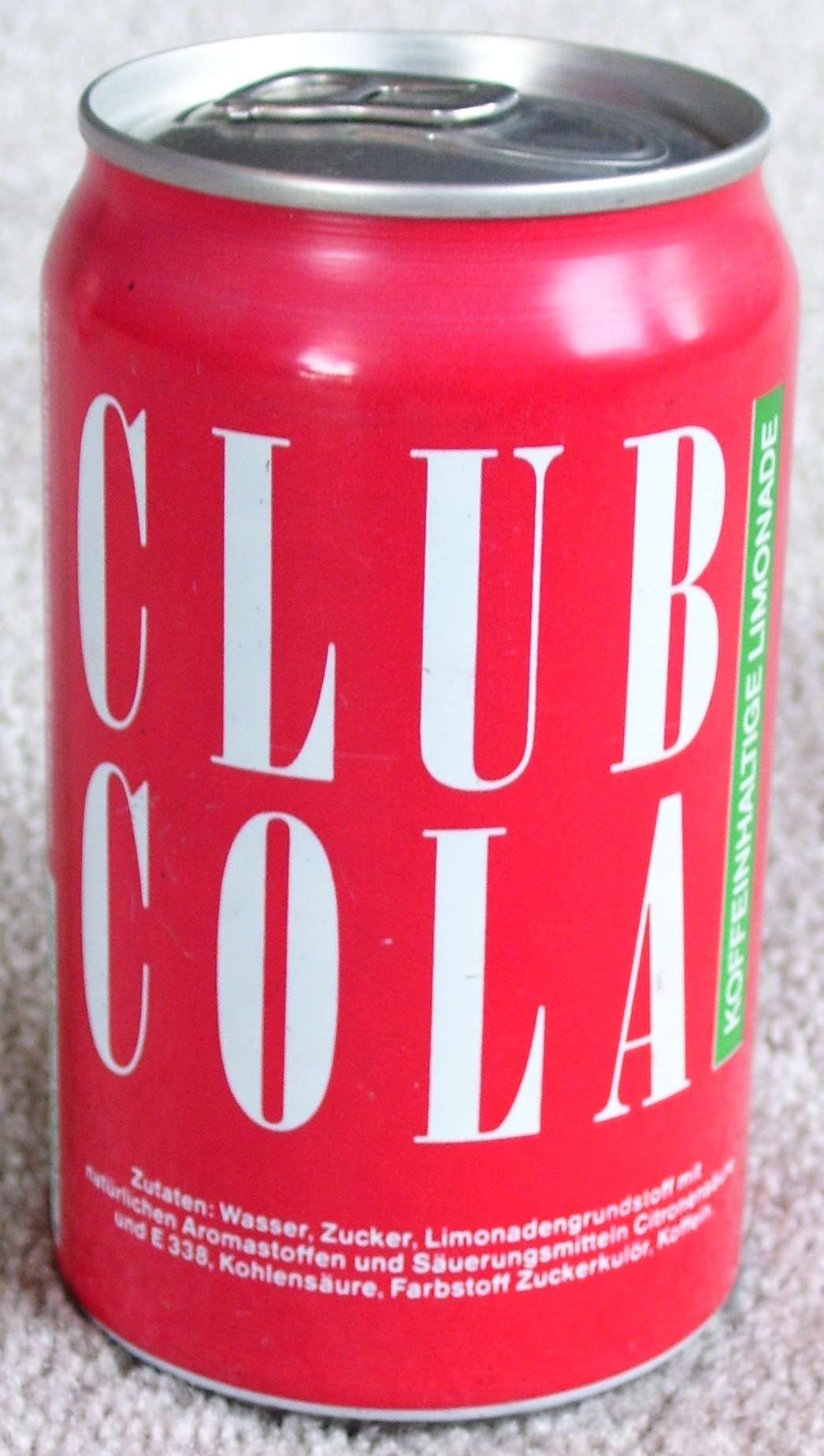
A can of Club Cola produced in 1993, after German reunification

Club Cola is a German cola soft drink.

Originally manufactured at the request of the Socialist Unity Party of Germany and other governmental organizations, Club Cola was created in order for East Germany to have its own cola soft drink that was similar in taste and appearance to those sold in the Western world.

The government announced a project to create the drink at the 1966 Leipzig Spring Fair. On 19 April 1967 the first Club Cola was bottled in East Berlin. This soft drink was so popular with East German citizens that Club Cola was awarded with gold in the category soft drinks at the 1972 Leipzig spring fair.

== Club Cola today ==
In 1992, Club Cola was reintroduced to the German market under the new management of Spreequell Mineralbrunnen GmbH and is now available all over the country. It benefited from Ostalgie, nostalgia for East Germany, but is also being promoted as a youthful brand today.

== See also ==
- Vita Cola
