= Bakal, Russia =

Bakal Бакал
- Town
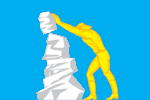
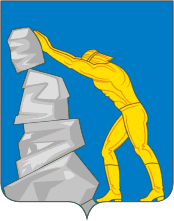
- Flag Coat of arms
- Interactive map of Bakal
- Location of Bakal Bakal (Chelyabinsk Oblast)
- Coordinates: 54°56′N 58°49′E
- Country: Russia
- Federal subject: Chelyabinsk Oblast
- Administrative district: Satkinsky District
- TownSelsoviet: Bakal
- Founded: 1757
- Town status since: October 25, 1951
- Elevation: 597 m (1,959 ft)

Population (2010 Census)
  - Total: 20,940
  - Estimate (2025): 15,947 (−23.8%)

Administrative status
  - Capital of: Town of Bakal

Municipal status
  - Municipal district: Satkinsky Municipal District
  - Urban settlement: Bakalskoye Urban Settlement
  - Capital of: Bakalskoye Urban Settlement
- Time zone: UTC+5 (MSK+2)
- Postal codes: 456900, 456901, 456903
- OKTMO ID: 75649103001
- Website: admbakal.ru

Bakal (Russian: Бака́л) is a town in Satkinsky District of Chelyabinsk Oblast, Russia, located on the western slopes of the Ural Mountains on the Chelyabinsk–Ufa railway branch, 264 kilometers (164 mi) west from Chelyabinsk, the administrative center of the oblast. Population: 20,940 (2010 census); 22,314 (2002 census); 24,101 (1989 Soviet census).

== History ==
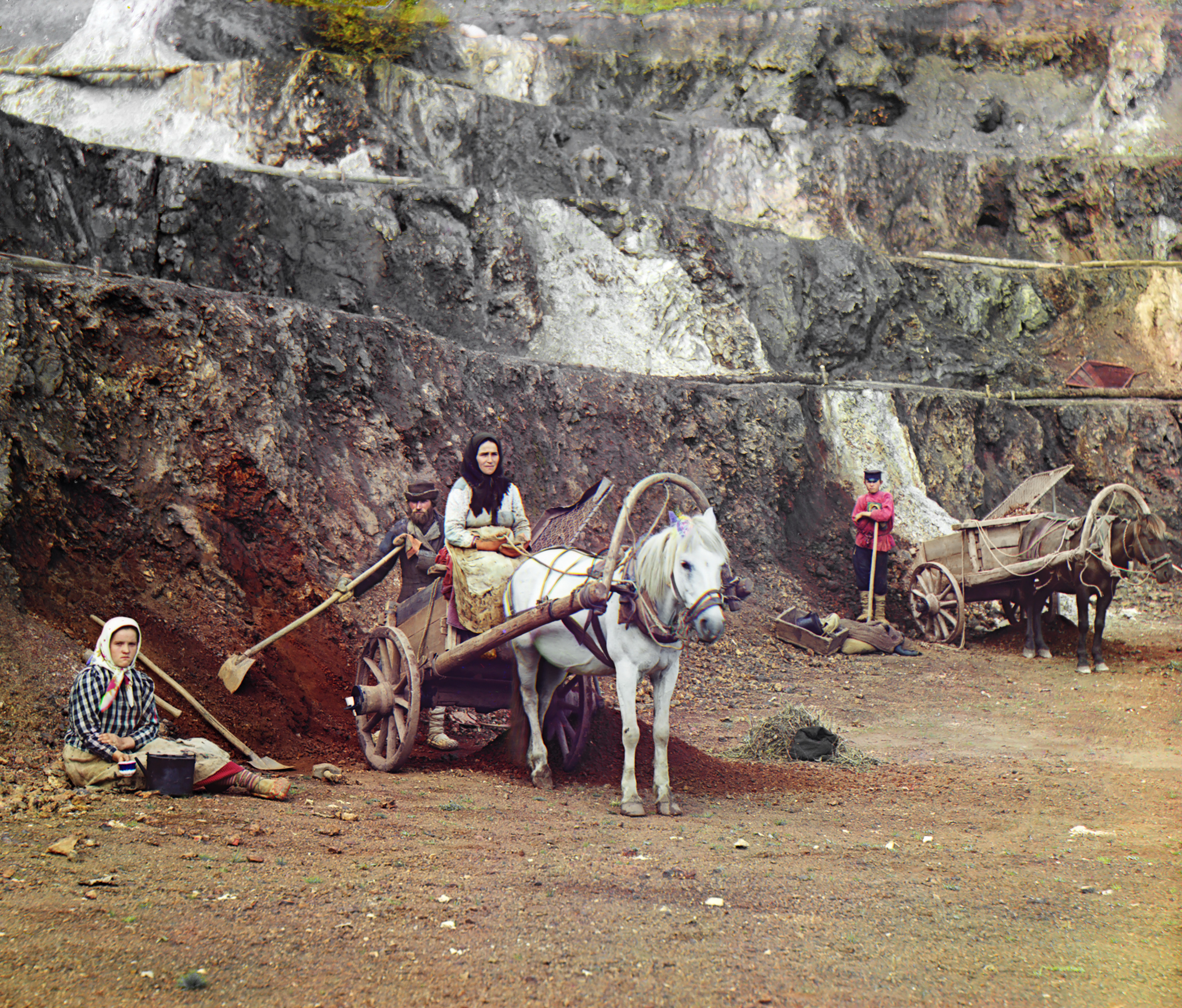
Work at the Bakal mines. Photo by Sergey Prokudin-Gorsky, 1910

It was founded in 1757 as a settlement of serfs resettled to man new Bakal iron ore mines owned by the association of Ivan and Yakov Tverdyshev and Ivan Myasnikov.

During 1941–1943, a gulag labor camp existed in the area known as Bakal ITL ("Bakal Corrective Labor Camp"), Bakallag (Бакаллаг, abbr. for "Bakal camp") or Bakalstroy of NKVD (Бакалстрой, abbr. for "Bakal construction"), with headquarters in Chelyabinsk. Its main occupations were the construction of a metallurgic, coke, and other plants, logging, and mining. Its peak inmate count was about 4,200. In addition, Bakalstroy was manned by Germans (with the peak count of over 27,000 as of January 1942).

Town status was granted to Bakal on October 25, 1951.

== Administrative and municipal status ==
Within the framework of administrative divisions, it is, together with four rural localities, incorporated within Satkinsky District as the Town of Bakal. As a municipal division, the Town of Bakal is incorporated within Satkinsky Municipal District as Bakalskoye Urban Settlement.

== Economy ==
The town's main enterprise is public company "Bakal Mining Administration" (ОАО "Бакальское рудоуправление", Bakalskoye rudoupravleniye, commonly referred by its abbreviation "БРУ", BRU). The bureaucratic-style name is inherited from the Soviet times.
