= Baykalsky =

Baykalsky (masculine), Baykalskaya (feminine), or Baykalskoye (neuter) may refer to:

- Baykalskoye Urban Settlement, a municipal formation which the town of Baykalsk and two rural localities in Slyudyansky District of Irkutsk Oblast, Russia are incorporated as
- Baykalskoye (rural locality), a rural locality (a selo) in Severo-Baykalsky District of the Republic of Buryatia, Russia
