= Bacall (surname) =

Bacall is a surname. Notable people with the surname include:

- Aaron Bacall (born 1940), cartoonist of newspaper comic strips
- Lauren Bacall (1924–2014), American film and stage actress and model, known for her distinctive husky voice and sultry looks
- Michael Bacall (born 1973), American screenwriter and actor

== See also ==
- Bacall to Arms, a 1946 Warner Bros cartoon in the Merrie Melodies series
- Bogart–Bacall syndrome, a vocal misuse disorder
- Bahcall, a surname
