= Boris Bakal =

Croatian artist

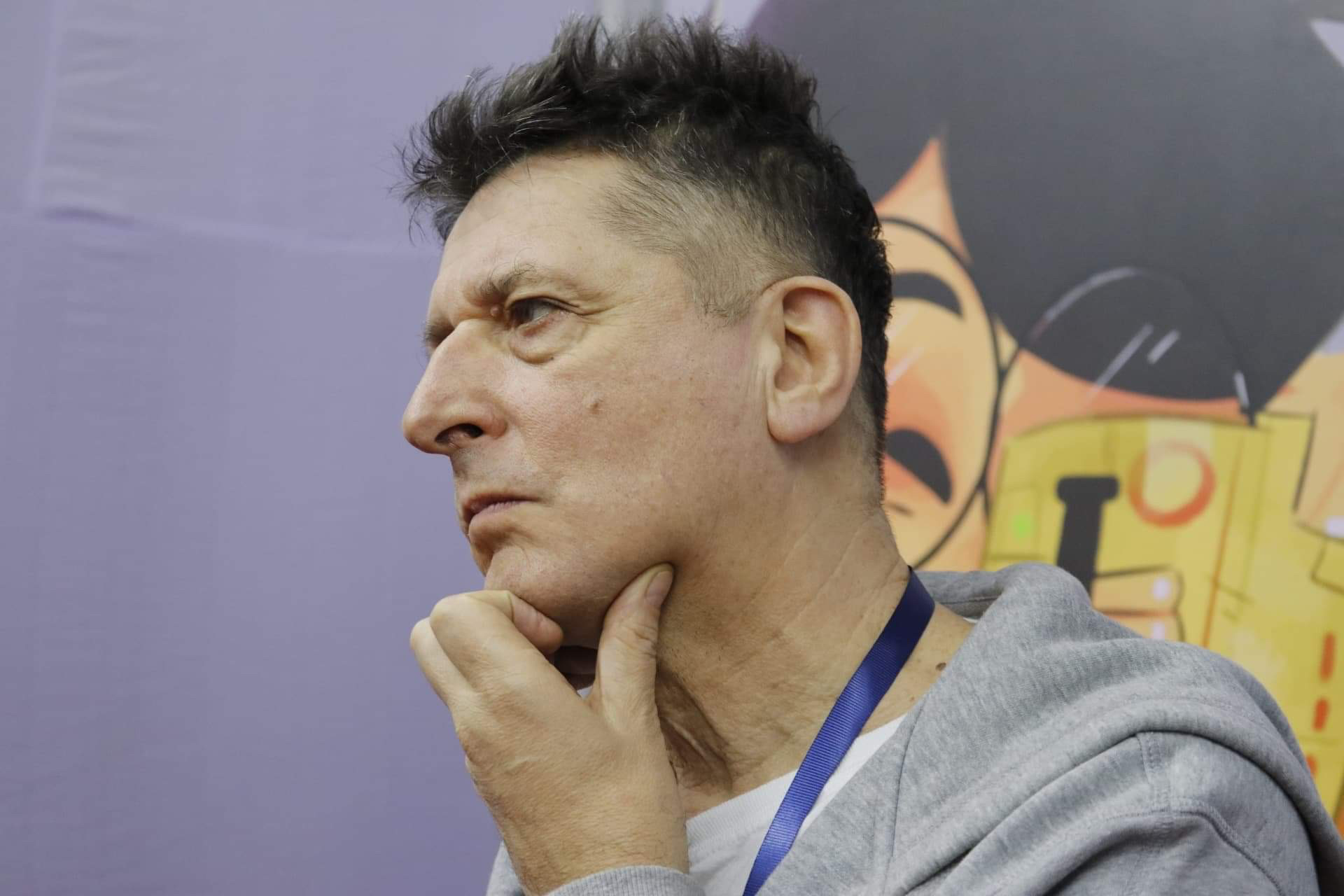
- Born: 1959 (age 66–67); Zagreb, SR Croatia, SFR Yugoslavia
- Known for: Theatre, film, writing
- Awards: ArtsLink Fellow, Bitef Festival Special jury awards, Pula Theatre Festival awards

Boris Bakal (born September 18, 1959, in Zagreb) is a theatre/film director and actor.

== Biography ==
Boris Bakal was born in Zagreb, Socialist Federal Republic of Yugoslavia (now the Republic of Croatia)

He was a visiting scholar/lecturer and researcher at New York University (1998), Stony Brook University (1999), Studio Art Centres International (Florence, 2000), and Columbia University (New York, 2003), Leiden University (2008), Kent University (Canterbury, 2013), DAMU (Prague, 2014) and others.

He was an artistic director and curator of the multidisciplinary urban festival "Hunting Season" (Stagione di Caccia) in Bologna, (Italy), from 1999 to 2001, and co-director and co-curator of Migrative Art Festival (within the Flying University Project), Louvain la Nuove (Belgium), 1993–1995 and Tunel Festival, Zagreb (Croatia) in 1995.

He is also a co-founder and co-author of the projects of Bacači Sjenki/Shadow Casters (since 2001). Bakal is signatory of the Declaration on the Common Language of the Croats, Serbs, Bosniaks and Montenegrins.

== Bibliography (selection) ==
- Sandra Uskokovic - "Choreographing architecture" - City, journal of analysis of urban trends, culture, theory, policy, action, Volume 21, 2017 - Issue 6, Print ISSN 1360-4813 Online ISSN 1470-3629, Routledge - Taylor&Francis Group, UK, 2017,
- Boris Bakal/Sandra Uskokovic – "Urban Hum: Memory Theater of the City" – Journal of Urban Cultural Research vol. 11, Osaka City University & Chulalongkorn University, Bangkok/Osaka, 2015
- Boris Bakal – "The Legend of the Boat" – Oris magazine for architecture no. 91, Oris House for Architecture, Zagreb, 2015
- Duška Radosavljević – Theatre Making – Palgrave Macmillan, 2013
- Duška Radosavljević – The Contemporary Ensemble: Interviews with Theatre-Makers – Rutlege, 2012
- Boris Bakal – "Fragments about the Space" – Kolo no. 4, Matica Hrvatska, Zagreb, 2007
- Boris Bakal – "The Naked and the Dead/Goli i mrtvi", Zarez 210, 2007
- Boris Bakal – "Recognizing networks", a chapter in the book: Katrin Klingan and Ines Kappert/Relations – Leap into the city: Chişinău, Sofia, Pristina, Warsaw, Zagreb, Ljubljana – 7 scenes from Europe – DuMont Literatur und Kunst Verlag, Cologne, 2006
- Katarina Pejović – "The Portret of Multimedia Artist", Up&Underground, 2006
