= Bakaly =

Bakaly (Russian: Бакалы) is the name of several rural localities in Russia:

- Bakaly, Bakalinsky District, Republic of Bashkortostan, a selo in Bakalinsky District of the Republic of Bashkortostan
- Bakaly, Burayevsky District, Republic of Bashkortostan, a village in Burayevsky District of the Republic of Bashkortostan
- Bakaly, Republic of Tatarstan, a village in Bavlinsky District of the Republic of Tatarstan
