= Waxman-Bahcall bound =

The Waxman-Bahcall bound is a computed upper limit on the flux of high energy neutrinos based on the observed flux of high energy cosmic rays. Since the highest energy neutrinos are produced from interactions of ultra-high-energy cosmic rays, the observed rate of production of these rays places a limit on these particles. It is named after John Bahcall and Eli Waxman.

== Cosmic rays ==
The Waxman-Bahcall limit comes from the analysis of cosmic rays at various energy levels and their respective fluxes. Cosmic rays are high energy particles, like protons or atomic nuclei that move at near the speed of light. These rays can come from a variety of sources such as the Sun, the Solar System, the Milky Way galaxy, or even further beyond.

Upon entry into our atmosphere, these cosmic rays interact with atoms in the atmosphere, initiating cosmic-ray air showers. These showers are cascades of secondary particles, including muons and neutrinos. These atmospheric neutrinos can be studied and a general plot of the energy of said neutrinos and their fluxes can be determined and created. The plot below shows the cosmic-ray energy spectrum. Caution: the energy spectrum of atmospheric neutrinos is different; also, the Waxman-Bahcall bound does not apply to atmospheric neutrinos, but to (ultra)-high-energy neutrinos from outside of our galaxy.

Cosmic ray flux versus the particle energy

During Waxman's and Bahcall's research and work into neutrinos, there seemed to be a gap of very high energetic neutrinos, past the atmospheric neutrino limit, but still below the GZK limit, meaning there exists some extra-galactic high energy neutrino source yet to be detected.

=== Atmospheric neutrinos ===
Atmospheric neutrinos are produced in the atmosphere, about 15 km above the Earth's surface. They are the result of particles, usually protons or light atomic nuclei, hitting other particles in the atmosphere and causing a shower or neutrinos into the Earths surface.

Sample proton cosmic shower as a result of atmospheric collisions

Atmospheric neutrinos were successfully detected in the 1960s when experiments were able to successfully find muons that resulted from these neutrinos. From that, they were able to find the energy of the neutrinos and the flux associated with them. Currently, neutrinos are able to be detected by many different experiments, such as IceCube Lab, allowing for the higher accurate measurements of their energy and fluxes.

=== GZK limit ===
The GZK limit exists as a limit on the highest possible cosmic-ray energy that can travel without interaction through the universe, and cosmic rays above around 5 × 10^{19} eV can reach Earth only from the nearby universe. The limit exists because at these higher energies, and at travel distances further than 50 Mpc, interactions of cosmic rays with the CMB photons increase. With these interactions, the new cosmic-ray product particles have lower and lower energy, and cosmic rays above a few 10^{20} eV do not reach Earth (except if their source would be very close). Important in this context is that the GZK interactions also produce neutrinos, called cosmogenic neutrinos. Their energy is typically one order of magnitude below the energy per nucleon of the cosmic ray particle (e.g., a 10^{20} eV proton would lead to 10^{19} eV neutrinos, but a 10^{20} eV iron nucleus with 56 nucleons, would lead to neutrions of 56 times lower energy than for the proton case).

== Waxman - Bahcall upper bound ==
The Waxman - Bahcall upper bound is derived from a problem where neutrinos were discovered to have a higher energy than the atmospheric limit but still below the GZK limit discussed above. Unsure about what possible source could be the cause of these neutrinos, Waxman and Bahcall worked to cross off possible other sources, such as assist from magnetic fields, redshift correction, and sources of high energy outside the Milky Way Galaxy.

The current upper bound on the intensity of muon neutrino is said to be:

$I_\text{max} = 1.5 * 10^{-8} * \xi_z \text{GeV} \text{cm}^{-2} \text{s}^{-1} \text{sr}^{-1}$

with the expected neutrino intensity to be 1/2 I_{max}.

=== Redshift losses ===
Initially in the derivation for the muon neutrino intensity above, redshift factors were ignored. However, if a correction factor was included, it could also be found that the neutrinos detected above either started out at high energies and were detected at a lower energy due to redshift.

It is known, however, that if red-shift is to be the prime factor in the limit, that the proton would have had to have a redshift z of less than 1. If the particle started from outside this range, as told by the GZK limit, other interactions would take place during the particles travel, and make it so that the neutrinos detected would be far below the threshold discussed.

Deriving a correction factor to multiply by Imax to change the threshold of the system, it was found to be:

$\xi_z = \frac{\int_0^{z_\text{max}} \mathrm{d}zg(z)(1+z)^{-7/2}f(z)}{\int_0^{\inf} \mathrm{d}zg(z)(1+z)^{-5/2}}$

Working with nearby galaxies and clusters, it was found that there is no significant change on the limit from the redshift correction, and that the reason for the limit and expected values outside of the limit has to come from some other external source.

=== Magnetic fields ===
==== Neutrino Source ====
Another factor to consider was the addition of the magnetic fields at the source of the neutrinos and how it might allow for increased energy of an incoming charged particle from a cosmic ray. If protons can be prevented from leaving the source due to a magnetic field, then only neutrinos would be allowed to go through, meaning we would be able to see higher level neutrinos. Bahcall and Waxman quickly ruled this out as a permanent option, as when there is a proto-meso interaction a charged pion is created but a proton is then also turned into a neutron. The neutron will not be affected by the field in any way, and will travel about 100 kpc when with high energies. This makes it impossible to exceed the upper bound found earlier from Waxman and Bahcall.

==== Intergalactic magnetic field ====
Another theory is that the intergalactic magnetic field would be able to change the direction of the protons on their way to Earth, allowing for the neutrinos to come in relatively in a straight line.

To derive this theory, Waxman and Bahcall started with the basic proton traveling with energy E, in a magnetic field B, and with correlation length λ. If the proton travels a distance of λ, the resulting angle of deflection is:

$\text{angle} = \lambda / R_l$

Where R_{l} is the Larmor Radius.

$R_l = E / eB$

If the angle is kept small, and propagating a distance l, the new deflection angle becomes:

$\text{angle} = \sqrt {l/\lambda} * \lambda / R_l$

Plugging in values for time, which would give us a maximum propagation distance that the particle could travel in that time, we find that the existence of a uniformly distributed inter-galactic magnetic field would have no effect on the limit.

=== Possible causes ===
==== Active galactic nuclei jet models ====
When looking out into the galaxy, and starting to think about what could have caused such high energy neutrinos to appear, it was thought of that jets from Active Galactic Nuclei (AGN) were the main cause. Looking further into the details, Waxman and Bachall saw that the intensities for jets from AGN's are two times higher in magnitude than the limit discussed above.

Initially, it was thought that the photons and protons were accelerated into the jets thanks to Fermi acceleration with an energy spectrum:

$\frac{\mathrm{d}N}{\mathrm{d}E} \varpropto E^{-2}$

for both protons and photons (simply plug in the values for photons or protons for either quantity). This implies the optical depth is related to E_{p} and assuming a small optical depth allows us to have the neutrino spectrum of:

$\frac{\mathrm{d}N}{\mathrm{d}E} \varpropto E^{-1}$

Later, it was realized that the decay of neutral pions, which are created along with charged pions, cause a high energy gamma ray emission. It was then found that the large energies being seen was not a result of Compton scattering of protons and photon, but of neutral pion decay. Once this emission was fixed, the intensity of the neutrinos found from AGN was under the max limit discussed above, and AGN then became a valid cause for these higher energy neutrinos if the area was optically thin and the energy burst was caused by a single interaction of a decaying neutral pion.

==== Gamma ray bursts ====
The Gamma-Ray Bursts (GRB) fireball model has also been another candidate for the reasoning behind higher energy neutrinos.

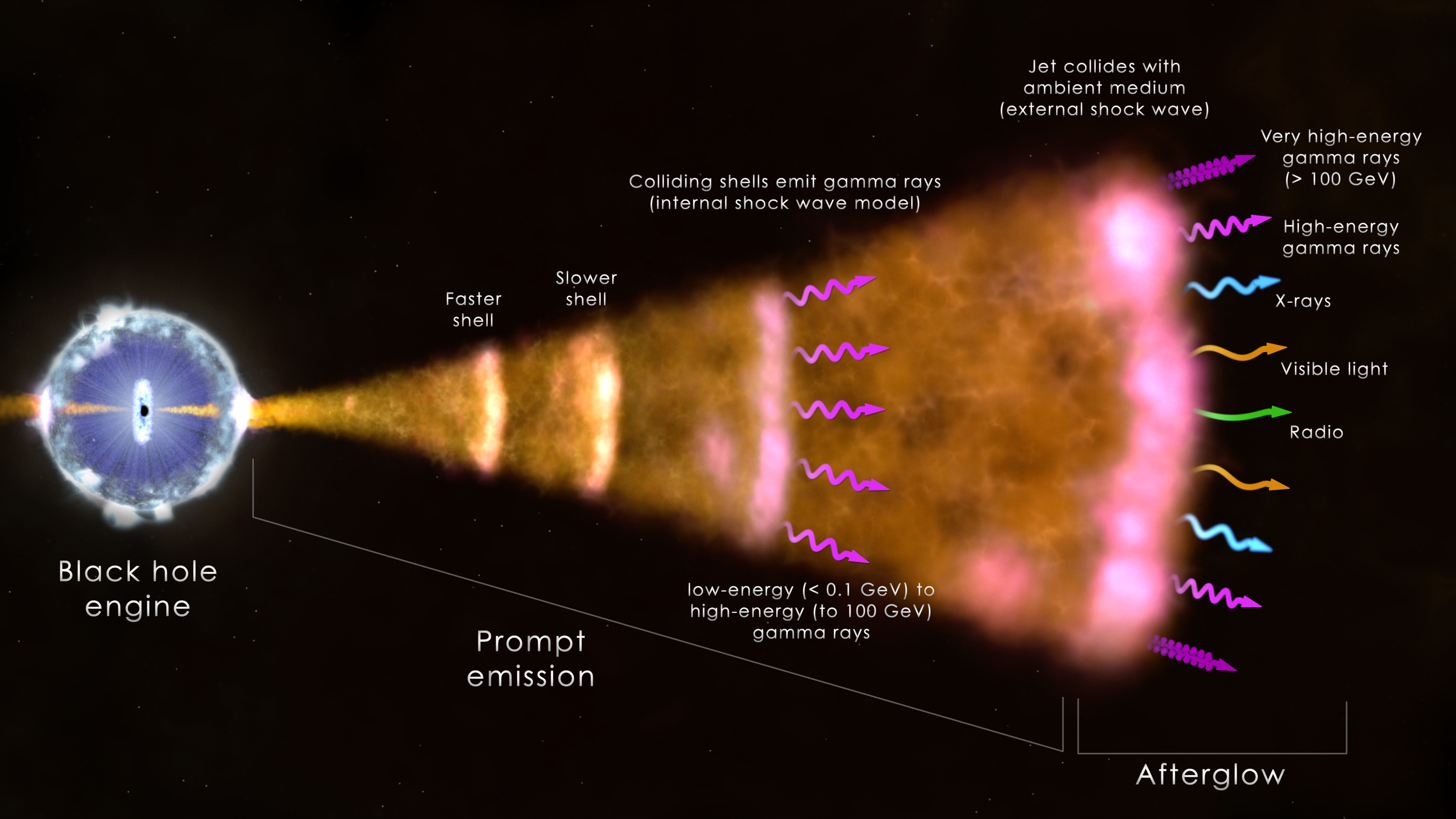
Gamma-ray-burst-Mechanism

The high energy neutrino model already took multiple variables into account and was a match for the limit discussed above. Similar to AGN's, the GRB's are optically thin, however, unlike AGN's which needed some more assumptions to be made on how the energy was being expelled and reached to match the flux calculations, the GRB model was able to correctly match this limit.

The fireball model works by having the initial burst of the GRB, but then has another shock later on which goes onto explain the afterglow associated with GRB's. This second shock continues to push particles away and allows them to reach detectors on Earth within the limits discussed earlier.

== Bibliography ==
- Alemany, R.; Burrage, C.; et al. "(2019). Summary Report of Physics Beyond Colliders at CERN".
  - Gives a sense of the colliders at CERN that can help with this data set
- Bradascio, F.. (2019). "Search for high-energy neutrinos from AGN cores". Proceedings of Science.
  - Another peer reviewed article, this source allows for further information into parts of AGN that is included in the initial article.
- Kachelriess, M.. (2022). "Extragalactic cosmic rays". FOS: Physical Science
  - A journal reviewed article describing extra-galactic cosmic rays
- Kachelriess, M.; Semikoz, D.V. (2019). "Cosmic ray models". Progress in Particle and Nuclear Physics, 109, 103710.
  - Peer reviewed journal that gives a broad understanding of cosmic ray models and different experiments
- Kajita T. Atmospheric neutrinos and discovery of neutrino oscillations. Proc Jpn Acad Ser B Phys Biol Sci.
  - Gives information about neutrinos - journal reviewed document
- Kimura, S.. (2022). "Neutrinos from Gamma-ray Bursts". FOS: Physical Sciences.
  - The peer reviewed journal article above works to give a further insight in to high energy neutrinos from GRB's, which is discussed in the original article by Bahcall and Waxman and gives a further insight into the paper
- Letessier-Selvon, A. (2001). "Establishing the GZK cutoff with ultra high energy tau neutrinos". AIP Conference Proceedings.
  - This is a peer reviewed source, and it works to add details about other factors and components necessary for our analysis
- Piran, T. (1999). Gamma-ray bursts and the fireball model. Physics Reports, 314(6), 575–667.
  - journal reviewed article that gives a brief insight into how the fireball method works.
- Kronberg, P. (2003). "Intergalactic Magnetic Fields". Physics Today, 55
  - The journal reviewed article above gives more information on the intergalactic magnetic fields mentioned above in the paper
- Waxman, E; Bahcall, J (1998). "High energy neutrinos from astrophysical sources: An upper bound". Physical Review D, 59(2).
  - This paper is a peer reviewed paper made by the authors Waxman and Bachall and gives a good overview of the overall topic chosen
