= Safi Bahcall =

American engineer (born 1968)

- Born: 1968 (age 57–58)
- Education: Harvard University, Stanford University
- Occupations: Physicist, Business Executive, Author
- Awards: Phi Beta Kappa; NSF Fellowship; National Merit Scholarship; Miller Research Fellowship; E&Y Entrepreneur of the Year
- Website: bahcall.com

Safi R. Bahcall (born 1968) is an American physicist, technologist, business executive, and author.

== Early life and academic research ==
Safi Bahcall was raised in Princeton, New Jersey, the son of the physicist John Bahcall and astrophysicist Neta Bahcall. From age 13 through 16 he enrolled in physics and mathematics classes at Princeton University. Bahcall received his B.A. from Harvard University in 1988 in theoretical physics, where he graduated summa cum laude and Phi Beta Kappa. He received a Ph.D. in physics from Stanford University in 1995, where he worked with physicist Leonard Susskind and Nobel laureate Robert B. Laughlin. He was supported by academic awards including a National Science Foundation Fellowship, a John Harvard Scholarship, and a National Merit Scholarship. In 1995, he was awarded a Miller Post-Doctoral Research Fellowship at U.C. Berkeley to continue his research in condensed matter theory.

His published work focused on superconductivity, random matrix theory, the quantum hall effect, and particle astrophysics.

== Business executive ==
In 1998, Bahcall joined McKinsey & Company, where he advised investment banks and pharmaceutical companies on strategy, technology, and operations. In 2001, he left McKinsey & Company and co-founded, with Lan Bo Chen of the Dana-Farber Cancer Institute, the Boston-based biotech company Synta Pharmaceuticals, which specialized in new drugs to treat cancer and chronic inflammatory diseases. Bahcall led its 2007 IPO on Nasdaq and was Synta's president & CEO for 13 years. In 2016, Synta Pharmaceuticals merged with Madrigal Pharmaceuticals.

In 2008, Bahcall was named Ernst & Young New England Biotechnology/Pharmaceutical Entrepreneur of the Year, In 2010, he and his work were featured in a Malcolm Gladwell profile in The New Yorker magazine. He was interviewed by Malcolm Gladwell for the 2012 New Yorker festival, discussing the role of serendipity in science. In 2011, he worked with President Obama's council of science advisors (PCAST) on the future of US science and technology research.

Bahcall has presented at academic institutions and research laboratories including Harvard, Massachusetts Institute of Technology, Stanford, Princeton University, UC Berkeley, California Institute of Technology, Cornell University, Bell Labs, Dana-Farber Cancer Institute, Massachusetts General Hospital, Rockefeller University, the National Institutes of Health, and the Weizmann Institute of Science in Israel, as well as companies and national security organizations including Amazon, Goldman Sachs, Google, Microsoft, Samsung, Spotify, Viacom, the US Air Force, the US Navy, and the CIA.

== Author ==
Bahcall's book Loonshots: How to Nurture the Crazy Ideas That Win Wars, Cure Diseases, and Transform Industries was released by St. Martin's Press in the Spring of 2019. It was listed on Washington Post's 10 Leadership Books to Watch For in 2019, Inc's 10 Books You Need to Read in 2019, Business Insider's 14 Books Everyone Will Be Reading in 2019, and Adam Grant's New Leadership Books to Look For in 2019. It debuted at #3 on the Wall Street Journal bestseller list; was an Amazon, Bloomberg, Financial Times, Forbes, Inc. Magazine, Management Today, Medium, Strategy + Business, Tech Crunch, Thrive Global, and Washington Post best business book of 2019; and was listed for the Thinkers50 and McKinsey-Financial Times Book of the Year awards. Loonshots was selected by Malcolm Gladwell, Daniel Pink, Susan Cain, and Adam Grant for their Next Big Idea Book Club in the spring of 2019, and by Bill Gates as one of three standout titles in the fall of 2019. In December 2019, Bloomberg announced Loonshots was the most recommended book of the year in its annual survey of CEOs and entrepreneurs. A paperback edition of Loonshots will be published by St. Martin's Griffin on September 1, 2020. Loonshots has been translated into 18 languages.

In February 2019, Bahcall published a Wall Street Journal op-ed in response to congressional hearings on the role of federal research in scientific innovation. In February 2020, Bahcall argued in a War on the Rocks article that the United States should establish a new unified Future Warfare Command. In March and May 2020, Bahcall published additional Wall Street Journal op-eds on the role of industry and government in developing new drugs for addressing the coronavirus pandemic. Bahcall has also written for the Harvard Business Review, Scientific American, and The Scientist.
