= Bakaly, Burayevsky District, Republic of Bashkortostan =

Bakaly Бакалы
- Village
- Location within Bashkortostan Location within Russia
- Coordinates: 55°49′N 55°43′E
- Country: Russia
- Region: Bashkortostan
- District: Burayevsky District
- Time zone: UTC+5:00

Bakaly (Russian: Бакалы; Bashkir: Баҡалы, Baqalı) is a rural locality (a village) in Kashkalevsky Selsoviet, Burayevsky District, Bashkortostan, Russia. The population was 195 as of 2010. There are 6 streets.

== Geography ==
Bakaly is located 23 km east of Burayevo (the district's administrative centre) by road. Kashkalevo is the nearest rural locality.
