= Ines Kappert =

German scholar (born 1970)

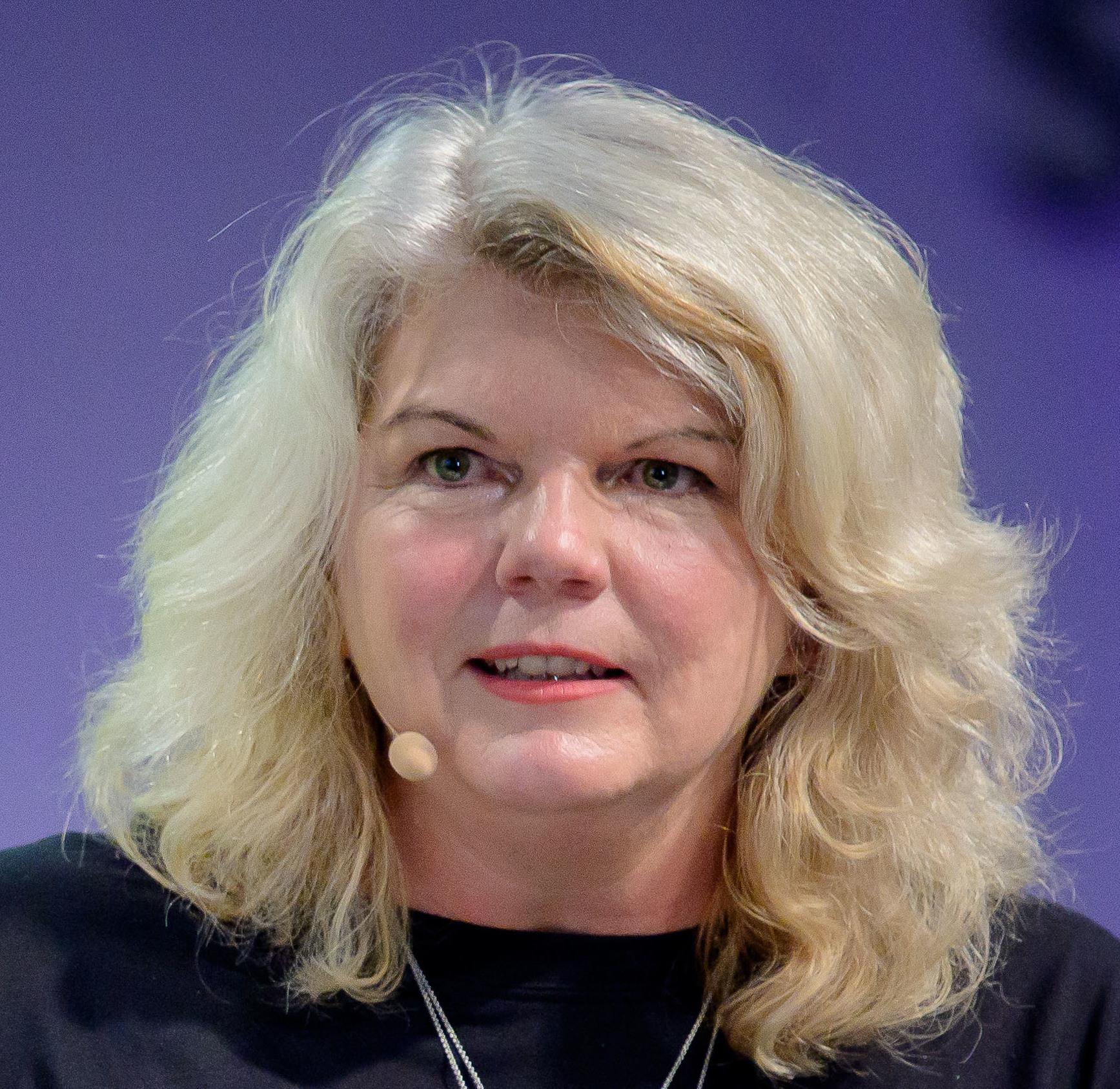
- Kappert in 2021
- Born: 1970 (age 54–55); Ulm, Germany
- Occupations: literary scholar; cultural theorist; journalist

Ines Kappert (born 1970 in Ulm) is a German literary scholar, cultural theorist and journalist. She has headed the Gunda Werner Institute of the Böll Foundation since 2015.

== Life ==
Ines Kappert studied at the Free University of Berlin and at the University of Paris VIII (Vincennes-Saint-Denis) Comparative Literature and Philosophy. In 1997 and 1998 she was a research assistant at the Theodor Fontane Archive in Potsdam, where she was responsible for the Fontane Year Berlin-Brandenburg, and from 1999 to 2003 at the center for Feminist Literary Studies at the University of Hamburg. During this time, she also worked as editor of the semi-annual journal figurationen. gender, literatur, kultur.

She completed her doctorate in general and comparative literature at the University of Hamburg as Dr. phil. Her dissertation was published in 2008 under the title Der Mann in der Krise. Oder: Kapitalismuskritik in der Mainstreamkultur as a book.

She was a research assistant at the Kulturstiftung des Bundes for the initiative project Relations. Art and Culture in Eastern Europe. Since 2010, she has been a lecturer in the "Gender and Diversity" course at the St. Gallen School of Economics St. Gallen. From 2005 to 2015, she worked as an editor at the taz, from 2008 she was head of the opinion section. In the summer of 2015, she succeeded Gitti Hentschel as head of the Gunda Werner Institute together with Henning von Bargen. Her main topics are feminism, conceptions of masculinity, Syria and displaced persons.

In May 2017, together with Annika Reich, she initiated the literature portal Weiter schreiben for refugee authors from crisis areas.

== Publications ==
- Sprung in die Stadt. Chisinau, Sofia, Pristina, Sarajevo, Warschau, Zagreb, Ljubljana: Kulturelle Positionen, politische Verhältnisse. Sieben Szenen aus Europa, zusammen mit Katrin Klingan, 1. Aufl., DuMont Buchverlag, 2006
- Der Mann in der Krise. Oder: Kapitalismuskritik in der Mainstreamkultur, Transcript Verlag, 2008

As editor

- Gender Revisited. Politik- und Subjektbegriffe in Kultur und Medien, Metzler Verlag, Stuttgart 2002
- Krisenfigur Mann = Male crises, Böhlau, Köln/Weimar/Wien 2002
- Ein Denken, das zum Sterben führt. Selbsttötung – das Tabu und seine Brüche (=Hamburger Beiträge zur Psychotherapie der Suizidalität 5), mit Benigna Gerisch und Georg Fiedler, Vandenhoeck & Ruprecht, Göttingen 2004
