= Bakal, Bangladesh =

Bakal বাকাল
- Village
- Location in Bangladesh
- Coordinates: 22°59′N 90°8′E
- Country: Bangladesh
- Division: Barisal Division
- District: Barisal District
- Upazila: Agailjhara Upazila

Area
  - Total: 3.50 km^{2} (1.35 sq mi)

Population (2022)
  - Total: 4,159
  - Density: 1,190/km^{2} (3,080/sq mi)
- Time zone: UTC+6 (Bangladesh Time)

Bakal is a village in Agailjhara Upazila of Barisal District in the Barisal Division of southern-central Bangladesh.

According to the 2022 Census of Bangladesh, Bakal had 1,112 households and a population of 4,159. It has a total area of 3.50 km^{2} (1.35 sq mi).
