= Baykalskoye (rural locality) =

Baykalskoye Байкальское
- Selo
- Location within Republic of Buryatia Location within Russia
- Coordinates: 55°21′N 109°11′E
- Country: Russia
- Region: Republic of Buryatia
- District: Severo-Baykalsky District
- Time zone: UTC+8:00

Baykalskoye (Russian: Байкальское) is a rural locality (a selo) in Severo-Baykalsky District, Republic of Buryatia, Russia. The population was 675 as of 2010. There are 15 streets.

== Geography ==
Baykalskoye is located 68 km southwest of Nizhneangarsk (the district's administrative centre) by road. Zarechny is the nearest rural locality.
