= John N. Bahcall =

American astrophysicist

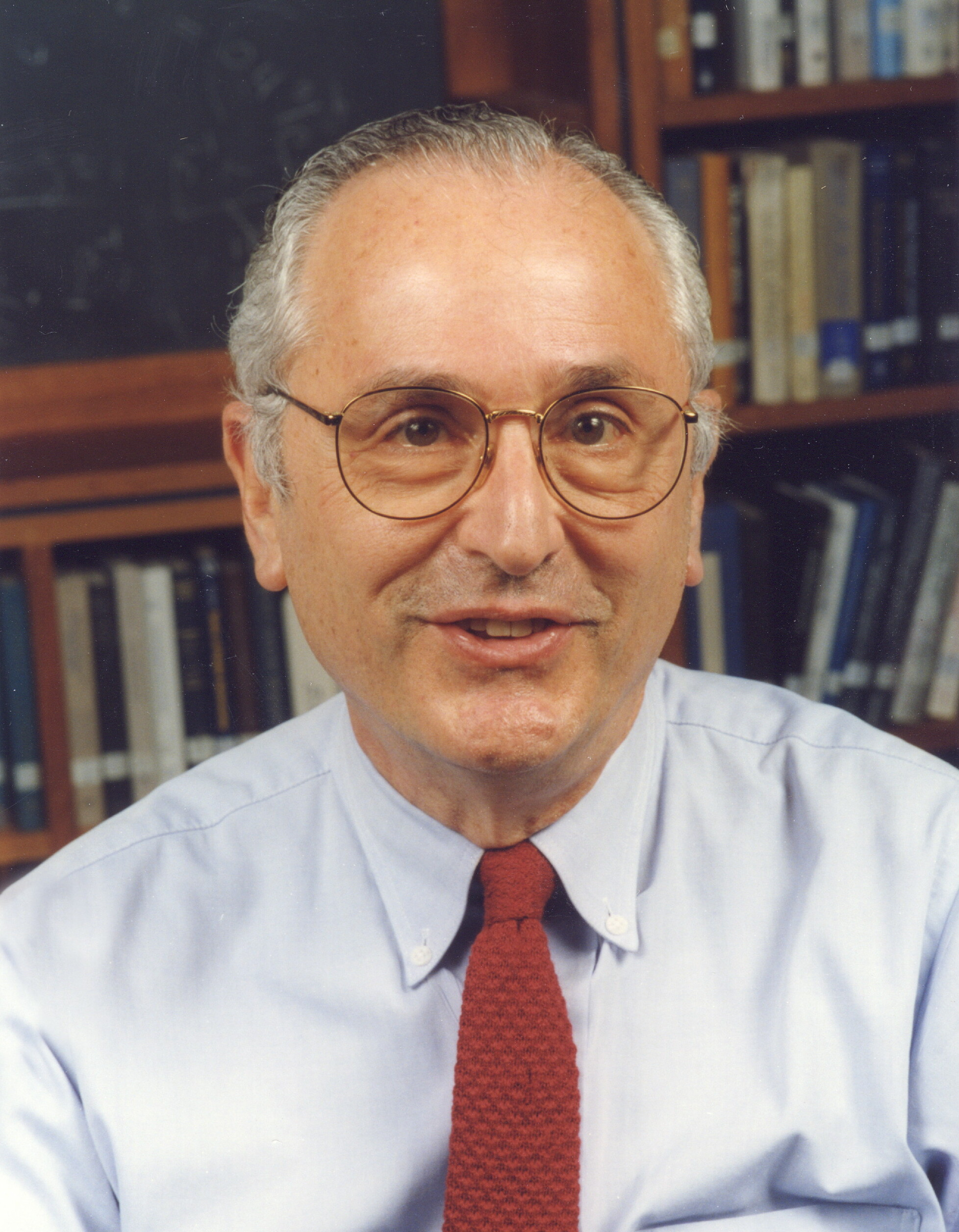
- Born: December 30, 1934; Shreveport, Louisiana, U.S.
- Died: August 17, 2005 (aged 70); New York City, New York, U.S.
- Resting place: Princeton Cemetery
- Education: University of California, Berkeley (BA); University of Chicago (MS); Harvard University (PhD)
- Known for: Solar neutrino problem Hubble Space Telescope
- Awards: Dannie Heineman Prize for Astrophysics (1994); Dan David Prize (2003); Enrico Fermi Award (2003)
- Scientific career
- Fields: Astrophysics
- Workplaces: Institute for Advanced Study; California Institute of Technology; Indiana University; Harvard; University of Chicago

John Norris Bahcall (December 30, 1934 – August 17, 2005) was an American astrophysicist and the Richard Black Professor for Astrophysics at the Institute for Advanced Study. He was known for a wide range of contributions to solar, galactic and extragalactic astrophysics, including the solar neutrino problem, the development of the Hubble Space Telescope, and his leadership and development of the Institute for Advanced Study in Princeton.

== Early life and education ==
Bahcall was born into a Jewish family in Shreveport, Louisiana on December 30, 1934, and would later describe an early aspiration to become a Reform rabbi. He did not take science classes at high school. In high school he was a state tennis champion and a national debate champion (1952).

Bahcall began his university studies at Louisiana State University as a philosophy student on a tennis scholarship, where he considered pursuing the rabbinate. At the end of his freshman year, he transferred to the University of California, Berkeley, still studying philosophy. He took his first physics class to fulfill a graduation science requirement, later saying:

"It was the hardest thing I have ever done in my life, but I fell in love with science. I was thrilled by the fact that by knowing physics you could figure out how real things worked, like sunsets and airplanes, and that after a while everyone agreed on what was the right answer to a question."

Bahcall switched majors to physics, and graduated with an AB in Physics from Berkeley in 1956. He obtained his MS in physics in 1957 from the University of Chicago and his PhD in physics from Harvard University in 1961.

He spent a year as a research fellow in physics with Emil Konopinski at Indiana University. From 1962 to 1970, he worked with a group led by William Fowler at the Kellogg Laboratory of the California Institute of Technology, first as a research fellow and later as an assistant and associate professor.

== Academic career ==
Bahcall joined the Institute for Advanced Study in Princeton, New Jersey in 1968 becoming a professor of natural sciences in 1971 and the Richard Black Professor of Natural Sciences in 1997.

Bahcall became a member of the National Academy of Sciences in 1976.

He was president of the American Astronomical Society from 1990 to 1992, and was president-elect of the American Physical Society at the date of his death.

== Research ==
Bahcall published over six hundred scientific papers and wrote or edited nine books on astrophysics.

He is most notable for his work in establishing the standard solar model. He spent much of his life pursuing the solar neutrino problem with physical chemist Raymond Davis, Jr. Together, Davis and Bahcall collaborated on the Homestake Experiment. To test Bahcall's theoretical predictions, Davis created an underground detector for neutrinos in a South Dakota gold mine, essentially a large tank filled with cleaning fluid. The flux of neutrinos found by the detector was one-third the amount theoretically predicted by Bahcall, a discrepancy that took over thirty years to resolve. Bahcall's ongoing research in this area resulted in publication of his book Neutrino Astrophysics (1989), considered a standard reference on solar neutrinos.

The 2002 Nobel Prize in physics was awarded to Davis and Masatoshi Koshiba for their pioneering work in observing the neutrinos predicted from Bahcall's solar model, thereby vindicating Bahcall's prediction.

In addition to his work on solar neutrinos, Bahcall collaborated with Eli Waxman on the Waxman-Bahcall bound for high energy neutrinos. This bound sets a limit on high energy neutrino flux based on the observed flux of high energy cosmic rays. It was not possible to verify this prediction until after his death, with the construction of neutrino telescopes capable of detecting very high energy neutrinos, such as the IceCube Neutrino Observatory.

Another contribution of Bahcall to astrophysics was the development and implementation of the Hubble Space Telescope, in collaboration with Lyman Spitzer, Jr., from the 1970s through to the period after the telescope was launched in 1990. In 1992, Bahcall received the NASA Distinguished Service Medal for this work. He reintroduced the traditional method of star counts, as a quantitative tool for assessing galactic structure.

The standard model of a galaxy, with a massive black hole surrounded by stars, is known as the Bahcall-Wolf model. The Bahcall-Soneira model was for many years the standard model for the structure of the Milky Way. He also contributed to accurate astrophysical models of stellar interiors.

== Personal life and death ==
Bahcall married Princeton University astrophysics professor Neta Bahcall, whom he met as a graduate student at the Weizmann Institute in the 1960s. They had a daughter and two sons (including Safi Bahcall).

He died in New York on 17 August 2005, from a rare blood disorder.

== Honors ==
- 2006, Exceptional Scientific Achievement Medal (posthumous), NASA
- 2004, Academy of Achievement, Golden Plate Award
- 2004, Comstock Prize in Physics from the National Academy of Sciences
- 2003, Gold Medal of the Royal Astronomical Society
- 2003, Benjamin Franklin Medal (with Raymond Davis, Jr. and Masatoshi Koshiba)
- 2003, Dan David Prize
- 2003, Fermi Award (with Raymond Davis, Jr)
- 2001, Member of the American Philosophical Society
- 1999, Henry Norris Russell Lectureship
- 1998, National Medal of Science
- 1998, Hans Bethe Prize
- 1994, Heineman Prize
- 1992, NASA Distinguished Public Service Medal, NASA
- 1976, Fellow of the American Academy of Arts and Sciences
- 1970, Helen B. Warner Prize
