= Inbar Bakal =

Israeli singer and songwriter

Inbar Bakal ענבר באקל
- Origin: Tel Aviv, Israel
- Occupations: Singer, songwriter
- Instrument: Vocals

Inbar Bakal (Hebrew: ענבר באקל) is an Israeli singer and songwriter. Her debut album Song of Songs produced by Carmen Rizzo, is a mix of Western classical, Arabic and Israeli music.

Bakal now resides in Los Angeles.

== Early life ==
Born and raised in Herzliya, Israel, to a family of Mizrahi Jewish (Yemenite-Jewish) and Iraqi-Jewish descent, she started as a child singer at the age of six, where she was a member of the "Li-Ron Choir" and gained advanced classical training as she participated in International Musical Festivals throughout the Middle East and Europe. When she was 12, her choir performed on the soundtrack to the 1993 film Schindler's List.

== Military service ==
At age 18, Bakal served four years with the Israeli Air Force where she was the first female officer ever in the Anti-Aircraft Combat Division, then a First Lieutenant in Military Intelligence Specializing in Public and International Relations.

== Discography ==
=== Album ===
- Song of Songs
