= Marthe Bacal =

French physicist

Marthe Bacal Verney (1931–2024) was a plasma physicist known for her research on ion sources, applications of ion sources in neutral beam injection, and diagnostics for ion beams. Originally from Romania, and educated in Russia and France, she spent much of her career in France.

== Life and work ==
Bacal was born in Bucharest on 28 March 1931. After a 1960 doctorate from the Saint Petersburg State Institute of Technology, she received a doctorat d'état in 1973 through Paris-Sud University. She became a research scientist at the École polytechnique in 1971, and in 1981 she became a researcher with the French National Centre for Scientific Research (CNRS). She died in Paris on 9 January 2024.

== Recognition ==
Bacal was the 1981 recipient of the Foucault Prize of the Société Française de Physique. She was named as a Fellow of the American Physical Society (APS) in 1996, after a nomination from the APS Division of Plasma Physics, "for her study of negative ion production in hydrogen plasma and the associated development of laser photodetachment diagnostics, and for the development of the volume H-source for neutral beam injection and other applications".
