= Bakal, Gao Region =

Bakal
- Town
- Location in Mali
- Coordinates: 15°8′N 0°1′W
- Country: Mali
- Region: Gao Region
- Cercle: Gao Cercle
- Time zone: UTC+0 (GMT)

Bakal is a Tuareg settlement (formed around a like-named waterhole) in the Gao district of Mali.
