= Bakal mine =

Iron mine in Russia

- Location: Chelyabinsk Oblast, Russia
- Products: Iron ore

The Bakal mine is a large iron mine located in western Russia in the Chelyabinsk Oblast. Bakal represents one of the largest iron ore reserves in Russia and in the world having estimated reserves of 1 billion tonnes of ore grading 38% iron metal.
