= Neta Bahcall =

Israeli astrophysicist and cosmologist

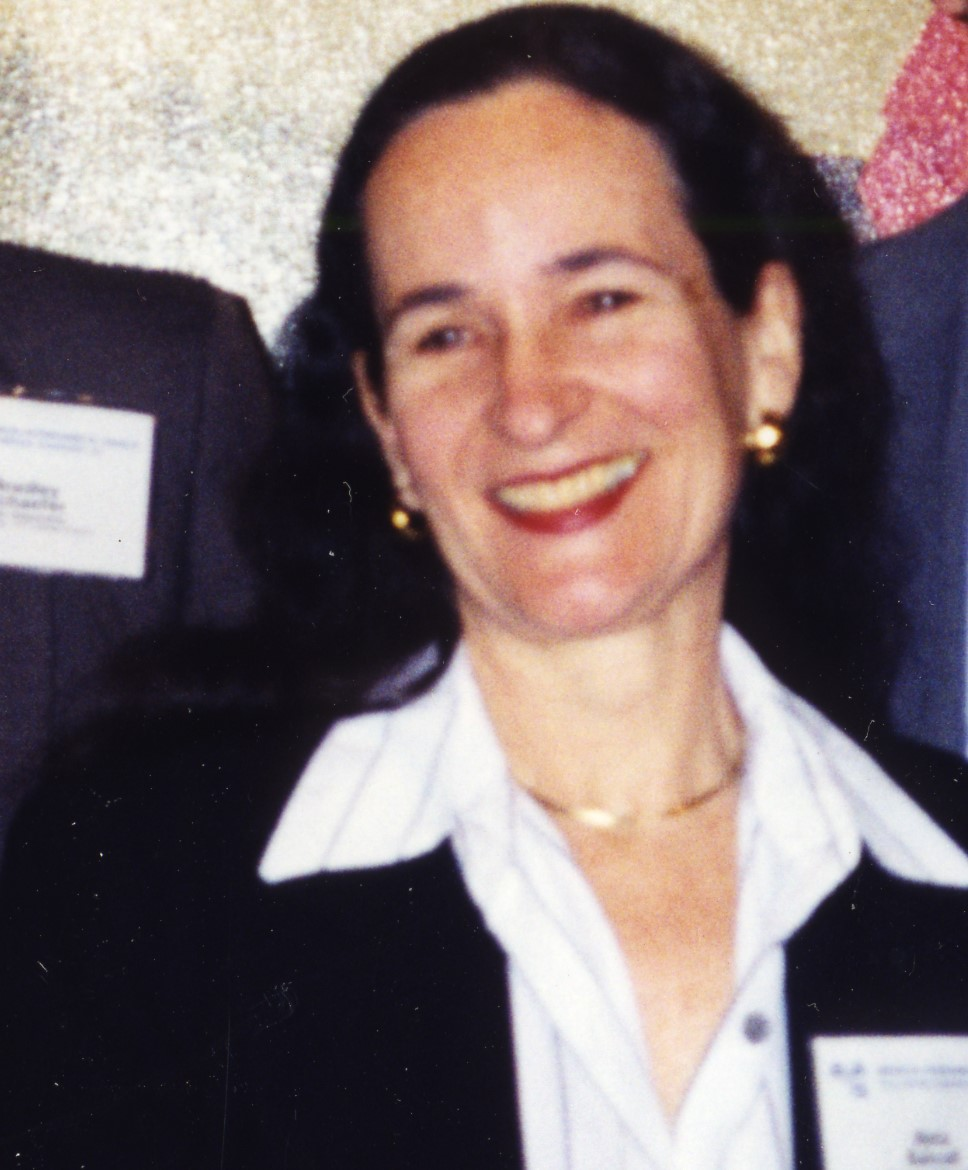
- Portrait of Neta Bahcall at a 1998 ASA Meeting Neta A. Bahcall
- Born: 1942 (age 83–84); Mandatory Palestine (now Israel)
- Citizenship: Israeli citizenship, American citizenship
- Known for: Galaxy clusters Dark matter
- Awards: Cecilia Payne-Gaposchkin Prize
- Scientific career
- Fields: Astrophysics
- Workplaces: Princeton University (1971-1983,1989-present) Space Telescope Science Institute (1983-1989) California Institute of Technology (1970-1971)

Neta Bahcall (Hebrew: נטע אסף בקל; born 1942) is an Israeli astrophysicist and cosmologist specializing in dark matter, the structure of the universe, quasars, and the formation of galaxies.

Bahcall is the Eugene Higgins Professor of Astronomy at Princeton University.

== Early life and education ==
Neta Assaf Bahcall was born in 1942. When she was growing up in Israel she initially wanted to go to medical school. However, not being the child of a doctor, she would not be able to. She received a B.S. in physics and mathematics at Hebrew University in Israel in 1963. In 1965, she received her Master's in physics at the Weizmann Institute of Science. In 1970, Bahcall received her Ph.D. in astrophysics at the University of Tel Aviv.

== Career ==
From 1970 to 1971, Bahcall was a research fellow in physics at the California Institute of Technology. The same year she received her Ph.D., she began working at Princeton University, where she has been a full-time astrophysics professor since 1989. Between 1971 and 1983, she was a research assistant to a senior research astrophysicist. From 1983 to 1989, she was the chief of the General Observer Support Branch and the head of the Science Program Selection Office at the Space Telescope Science Institute, where she chose which science programs would have access to the Hubble. She was also the director of the Council on Science and Technology of Princeton from 2000 to 2008.

Through the use of the Hubble Space Telescope she has mapped the location and structure of various galaxies. One of her most important contributions to the field of astrophysics was her calculations of the mass of the universe.

In 1997, Bahcall was elected a member of the National Academy of Sciences. She has been a lecturer for numerous organizations including the Nobel Symposium in Stockholm in 1998. Bahcall has been a longtime member of and vice president of the American Astronomical Society from 1995 to 1998. Bahcall has also been a member of: the National Astronomy and Astrophysics Advisory Committee (2003–2007), the Space Telescope Institute Council (1993-1997), the U.S. National Committee to IAU (1998-2004), the Scientific Advisory Committee of the Sloan Digital Sky Survey (1990-1995), the American Institute of Physics Committee on International Relations (1990–1993), and was the chair of the AAS Committee on the Status of Women in Astronomy (1983). She received an honorary doctorate from Ohio State University in 2006.

== Personal life ==
Neta was married to John Bahcall, who was a professor at the Institute for Advanced Study and also an astrophysicist, until his death in 2005. The two were frequent collaborators, publishing over 20 refereed papers as co-authors. John and Neta Bahcall had three children, all of whom earned doctorates in the sciences.

When asked about her religious views and belief in God, Bahcall stated: "I am not very religious, but am very Jewish... I combine the science that I do with the religion's question about God in the sense that all the laws of physics that created the Universe and the enormous amount of beauty in the Universe represent the connection to God."

== Awards and honors ==
- Awarded the Henry Norris Russell Lectureship by the American Astronomical Society in January 2024
- Elected a Legacy Fellow of the American Astronomical Society in 2020
- The Cecilia Payne-Gaposchkin Prize, Harvard University (2013)
- Distinguished Research Chair, Perimeter Institute for Theoretical Physics, Ontario, Canada (2009 -2013)
- Honorary Degree, Doctor of Science, Ohio State University (2006)
- Member, National Academy of Sciences, USA (elected 1997)

== Selected works ==
- Neta A. Bahcall; Jeremiah P. Ostriker; Saul Perlmutter & Paul J. Steinhardt (1999). "The Cosmic Triangle: Revealing the State of the Universe" (PDF). Science. 284 (5419): 1481–1488. arXiv:astro-ph/9906463v4. Bibcode:1999Sci...284.1481B. doi:10.1126/science.284.5419.1481. S2CID 15271568. Archived from the original (PDF) on 2016-12-04.
- Bahcall, N.A; Cen, R. (1992), "Galaxy clusters and cold dark matter-A low-density unbiased universe?", The Astrophysical Journal Letters, vol. 398, p. L81-L84, Bibcode:1992ApJ...398L..81B, doi:10.1086/186582
- Bahcall, N.A; Cen, R. (1993), "The Mass Function of Clusters of Galaxies", The Astrophysical Journal, vol. 407, p. L49-L52, Bibcode:1993ApJ...407L..49B, doi:10.1086/186803
