= Baikal (drink) =

Russian soft drink

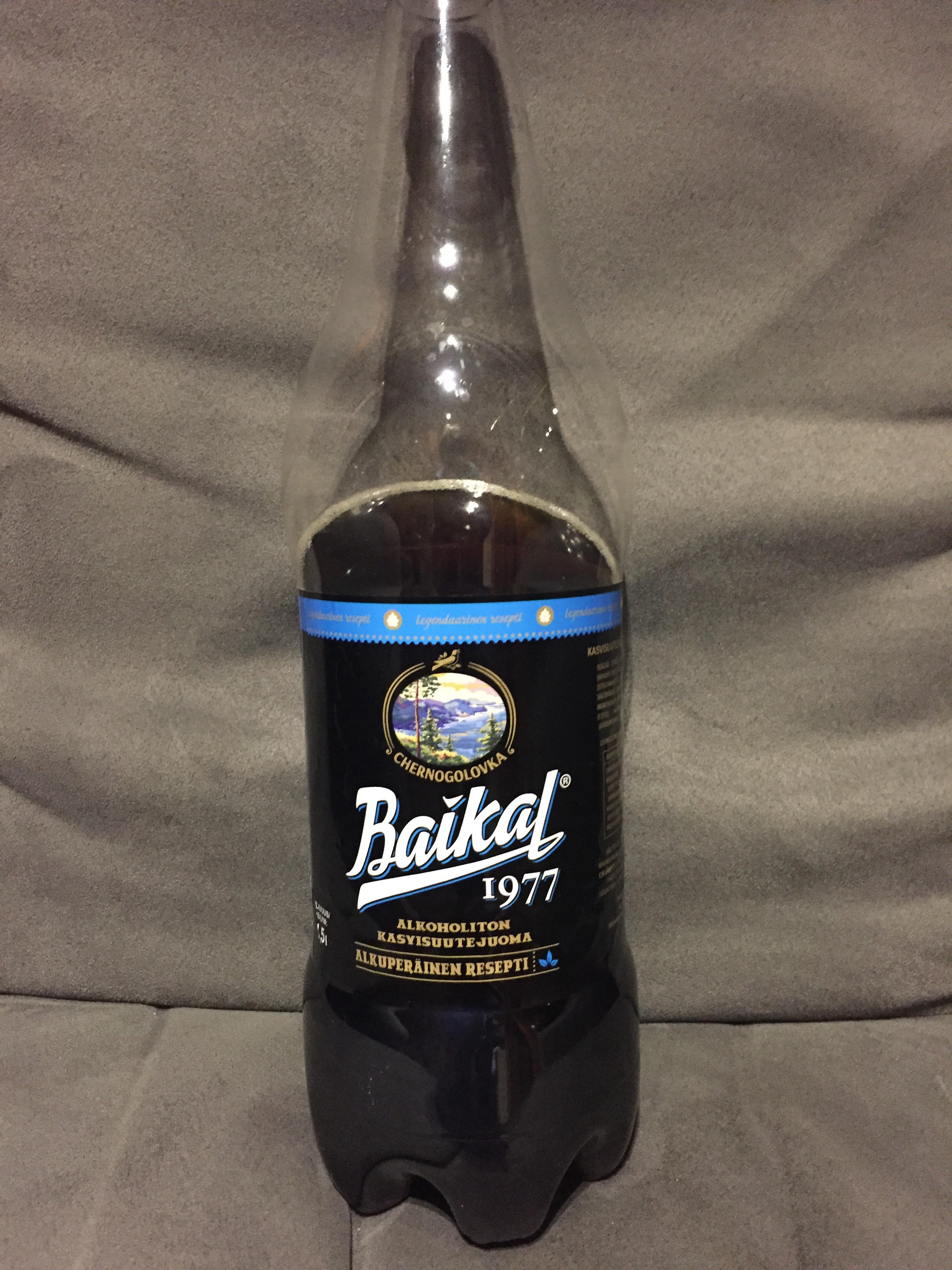
- A bottle of Baikal 1977 sold in Finland
- Type: Non-alcoholic beverage, Carbonated drink
- Manufacturer: Chernogolovka
- Origin: Soviet Union (1973); Russia (today), Russia
- Introduced: 1973–present
- Colour: Dark brown/red
- Flavour: Sweet-spicy
- Ingredients: extracts and oils of medicinal herbs and plants - black tea extract, eleutherococcus, lemon, cardamom and eucalyptus
- Variants: Baikal 1977, Baikal Cherry

Baikal (Russian: Байкал) is a Soviet non-alcoholic beverage of dark-brown colour, developed as an alternative to Coca-Cola. The beverage's basis is water, but it also contains extracts of natural herbs, sugar, citric acid, and carbon dioxide. The natural herbs and extracts utilized typically include black tea extract, Siberian ginseng, cardamom oil, eucalyptus oil, lemon oil, liquorice, St. John's wort and laurel.

== History ==
Baikal's production started in 1969. It was developed as a Soviet alternative to Coca-Cola.

The drink was developed with the Moscow 1980 Summer Olympics in mind, as Western soda companies did not operate in the USSR at that time. It successfully reached its goal of becoming the official drink of those Summer Olympics. The drink was named after Lake Baikal, as a symbol of purity and unique nature. Baikal's formula was redesigned after Pepsi Cola entered production in the USSR in 1973.

The recipe for the drink “Baikal” had the following composition:

treated drinking water, white crystalline sugar, citric acid (acidity regulator);

natural aromatic substances:

herbal flavoring, which includes extracts of: sage, wormwood (Artemisia absinthium), angelica root, gentian, cardamom, hop oil, eucalyptus oil, bay leaf oil, natural apple flavoring, elderflower extract, licorice root extract, wine yeast distillate.

In Moscow in the 1990s, it was nearly impossible to find Baikal; nevertheless, in Saint Petersburg, the beverage's production was continued by the "Polustrovo" factory.

== Baikal today ==
The rights to the Baikal formula are owned by Russian government's Institute of Brewing, Drink and Wine Research, which licenses the production of Baikal. Currently, the formula is licensed to Pepsi, Dohler and Ost-Aqua, amongst other smaller companies. The institute is developing new formulas for low calorie and diabetic friendly Baikal soft drinks.

There are several generic carbonated soft drinks sold under the name Baikal both inside of Russia and abroad, made by various companies – for instance, SLCO GmbH (Siberia Group) in Germany. One such soft drink brand inspired by the original Baikal drink is WOSTOK (meaning 'East' in Russian), having been invented in 2009 by a Dutch photographer who had spent nearly two decades in Moscow. Wostok's Tannenwald flavour claims to be based on the original 1973 recipe.

Rospatent recognized the combined designation Baikal as of 1 May 2019 as a well-known trademark in the Russian Federation, in respect of goods of class 32 of the Nice Classification "non-alcoholic carbonated drinks", in the name of Baikal LLC, Irkutsk.

=== Aqualife ===
At present, industrial bottling of non-alcoholic carbonated drinks marked with a combined designation, including the word element "BAIKAL", is carried out on the basis of a license agreement at the LLC "PK" AQUALIFE " enterprise.

OOO PK Aqualife currently manufactures several versions of Baikal soft drink, both in several brands of renewed recipes, and also the original formula of 1977. The original recipe of the soda is sold under the "Baikal 1977" trademark, whereas the new recipe is sold as simply "Baikal". The company also manufactures multiple new versions, which are based on the original 1977 recipe, such as vanilla and low calorie.

In 2021, Coca-Cola sued Aqualife for Fantola, a Fanta competitor, according to the Russian newspaper Kommersant.

=== Germany ===
The WOSTOK line of products are produced and available in Germany by WOSTOK - Baikal Getränke GmbH.

=== Ukraine ===
Several manufacturers produce Baikal in Ukraine under the trademark «Байкал». One of them is Biola («Біола») with «Фастрон» and «Ерлан» plants in Dnipro and «Орлан» plant Kyiv.

Some manufacturers produce under the name "Synevyr". Rebranding was carried out in connection with de-Russification.

=== Kazakhstan ===
TOO «ДальПродукт» manufactures Baikal in Almaty, Kazakhstan.

== Ingredients ==
A 1 liter glass bottle of Chernogolovka Baikal contains: Artesian water, sugar, extracts (eleutherococcus, black tea), caramel color (E150), natural flavors, acidity regulator citric acid, oils (cardamom, eucalyptus, lemon), preservative sodium benzoate.
