= List of soft drinks by country =

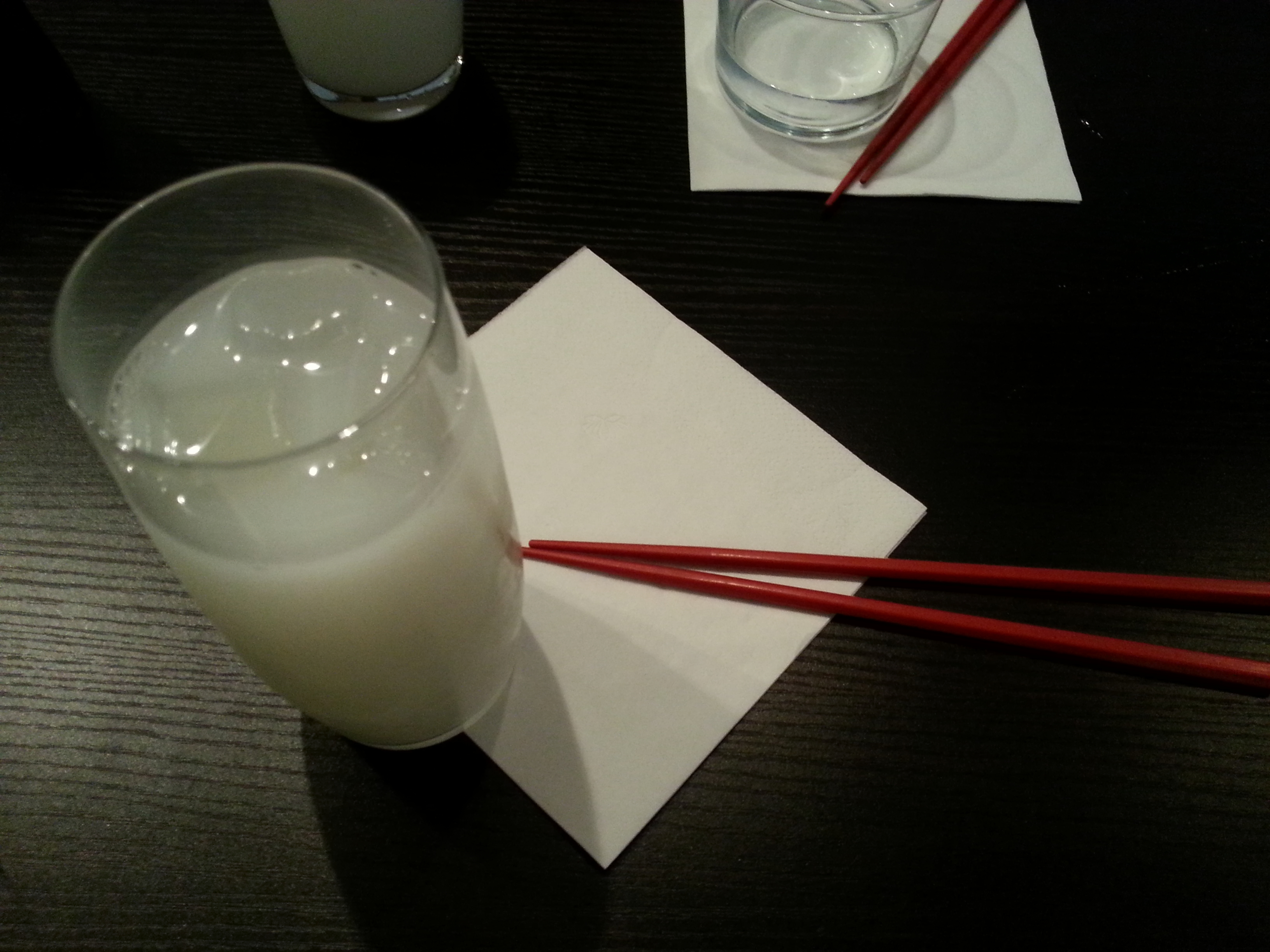
A glass of Japanese Calpis

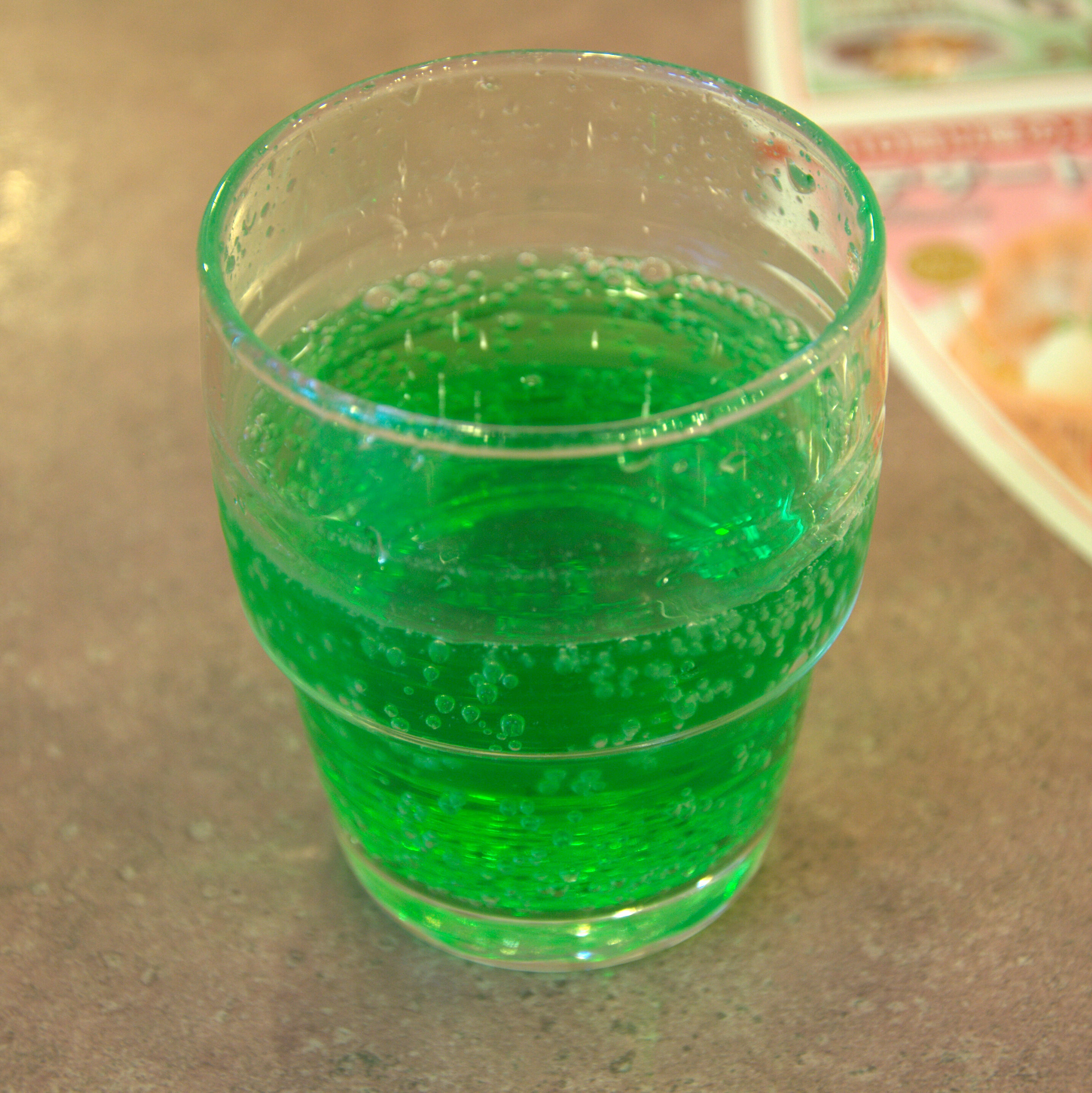
A glass of Fanta melon soda

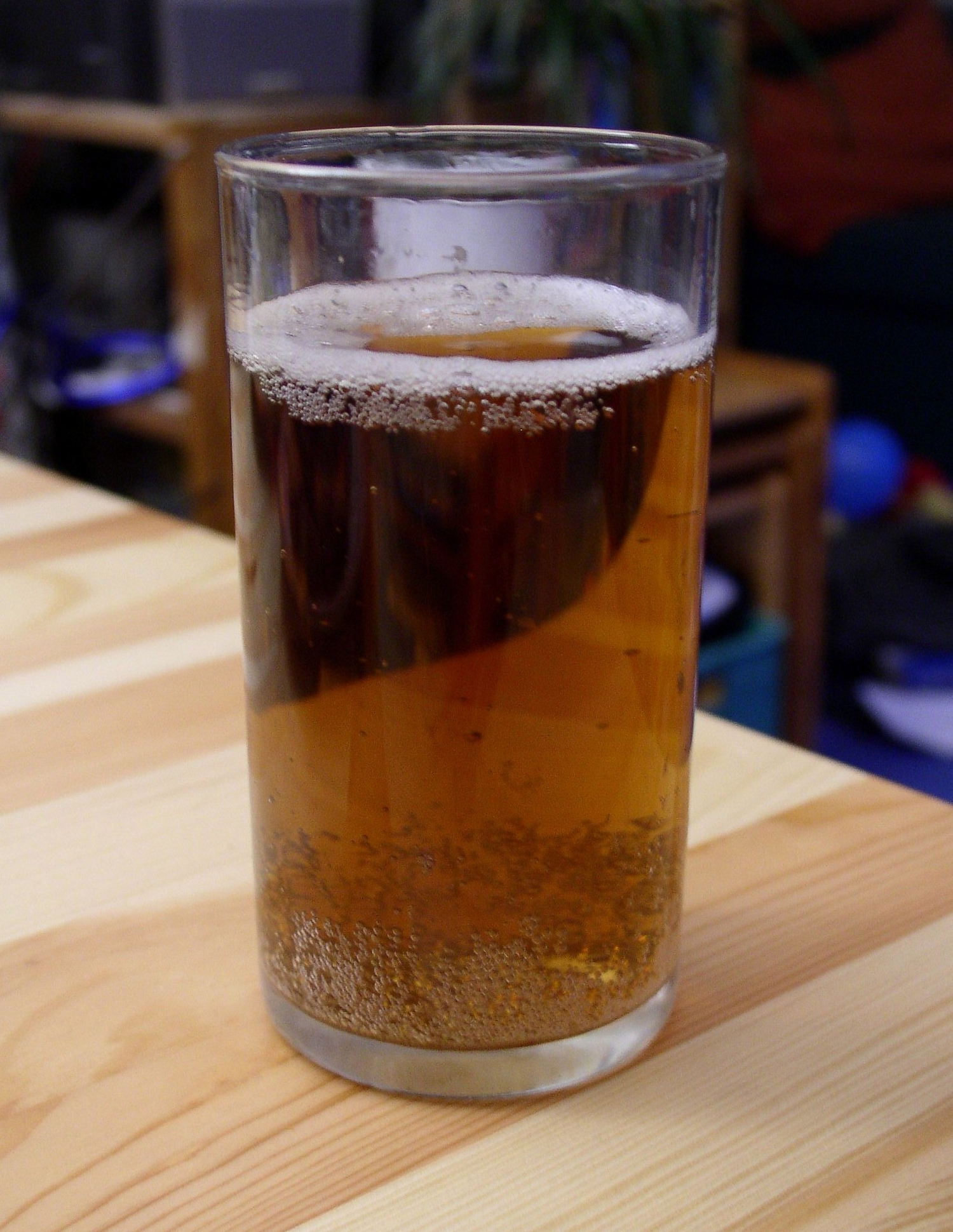
A glass of German fassbrause

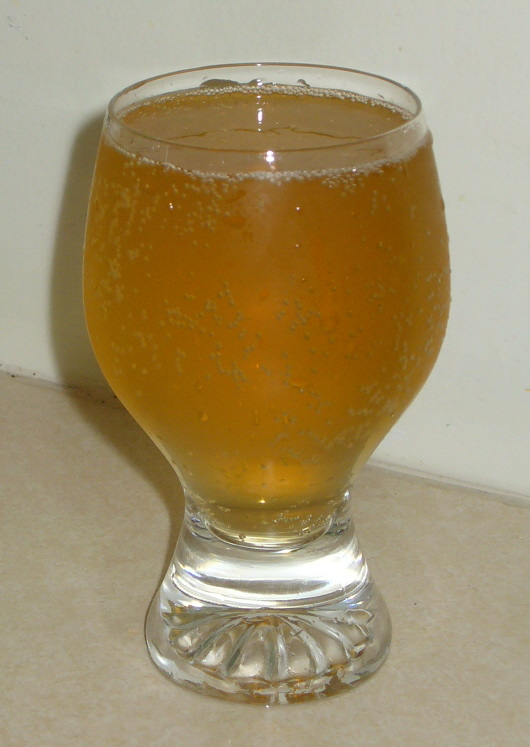
A glass of USA ginger ale

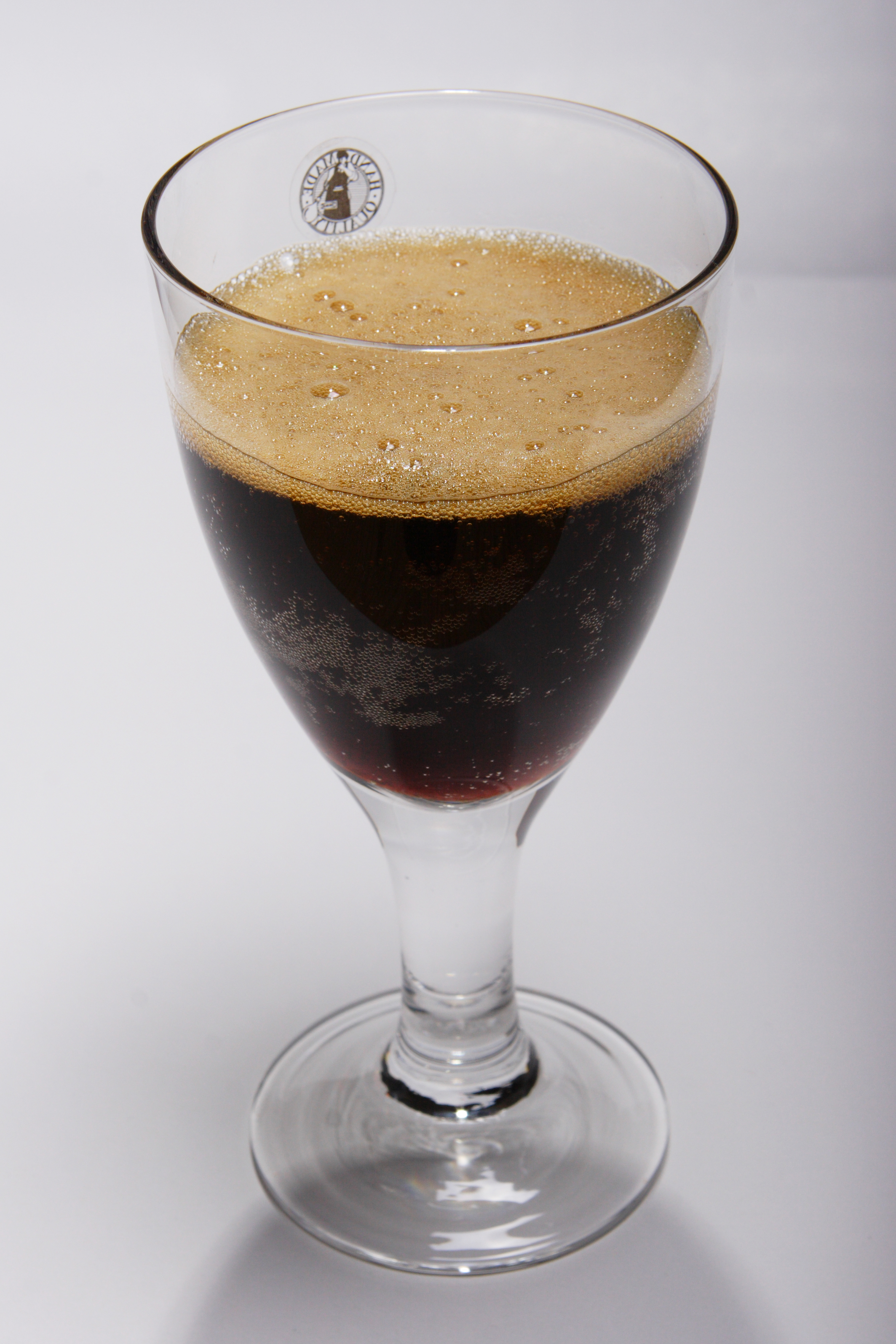
A glass of Swedish Julmust

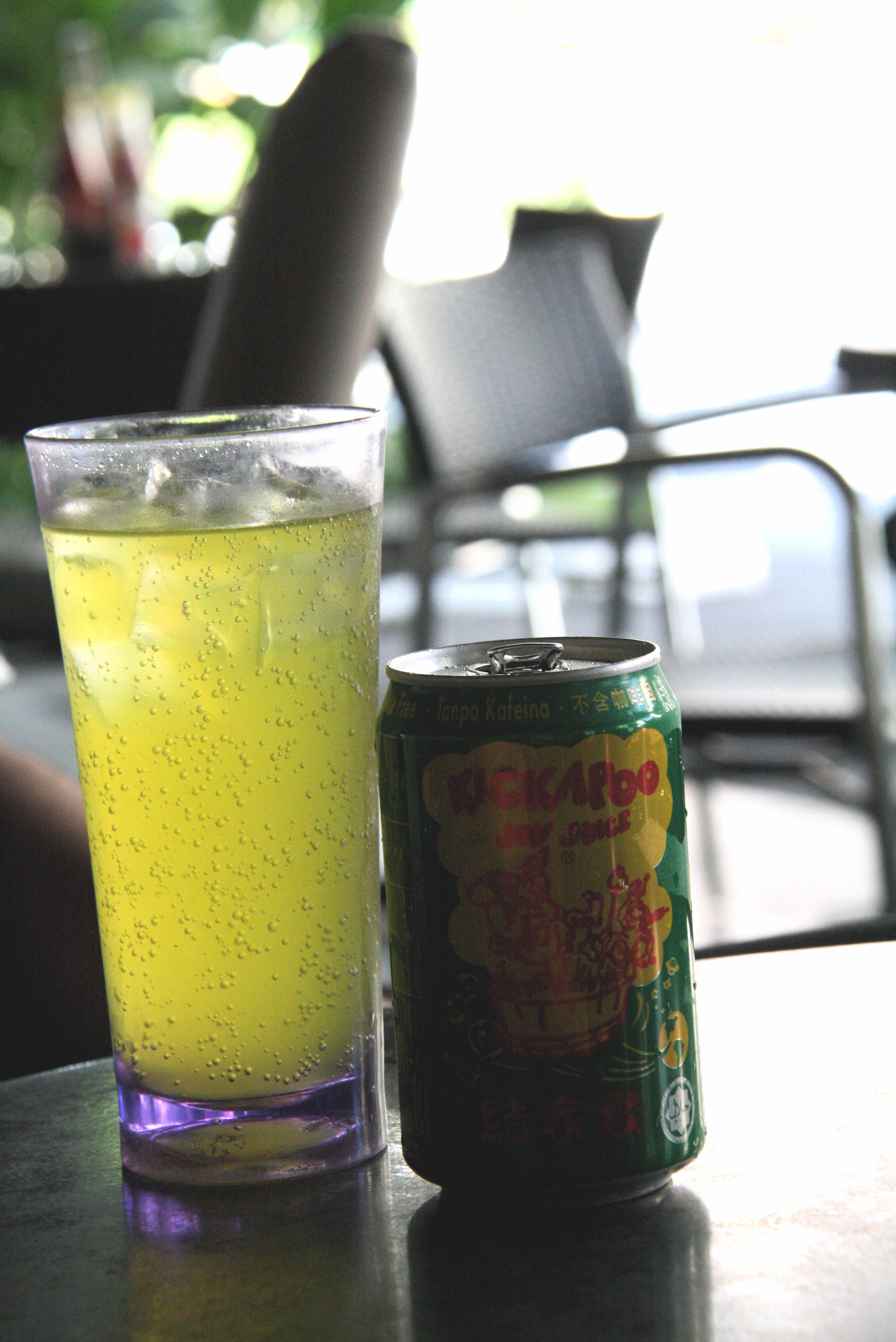
Kickapoo Joy Juice originated in the United States.

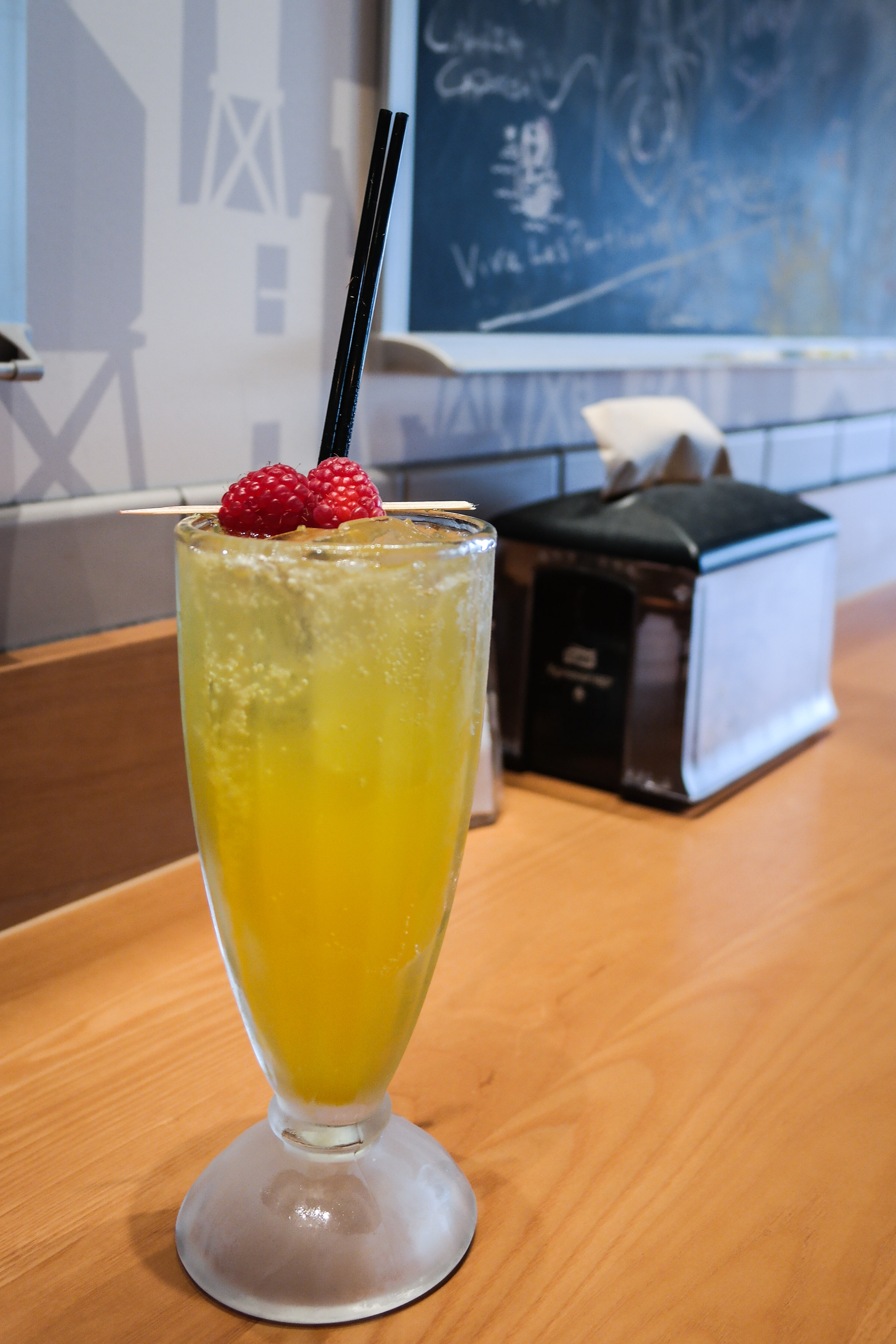
Orange soda from USA

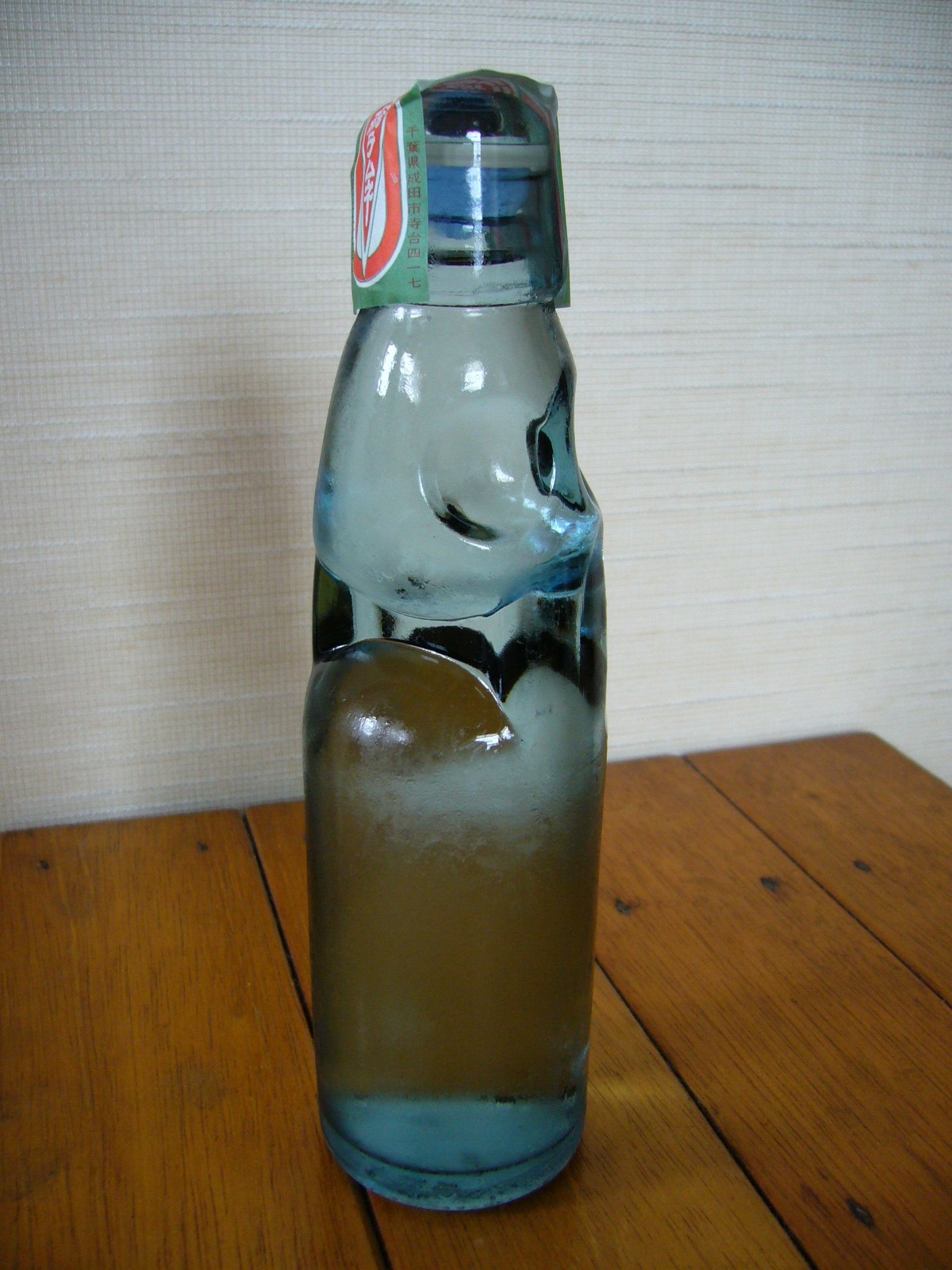
Japanese Ramune

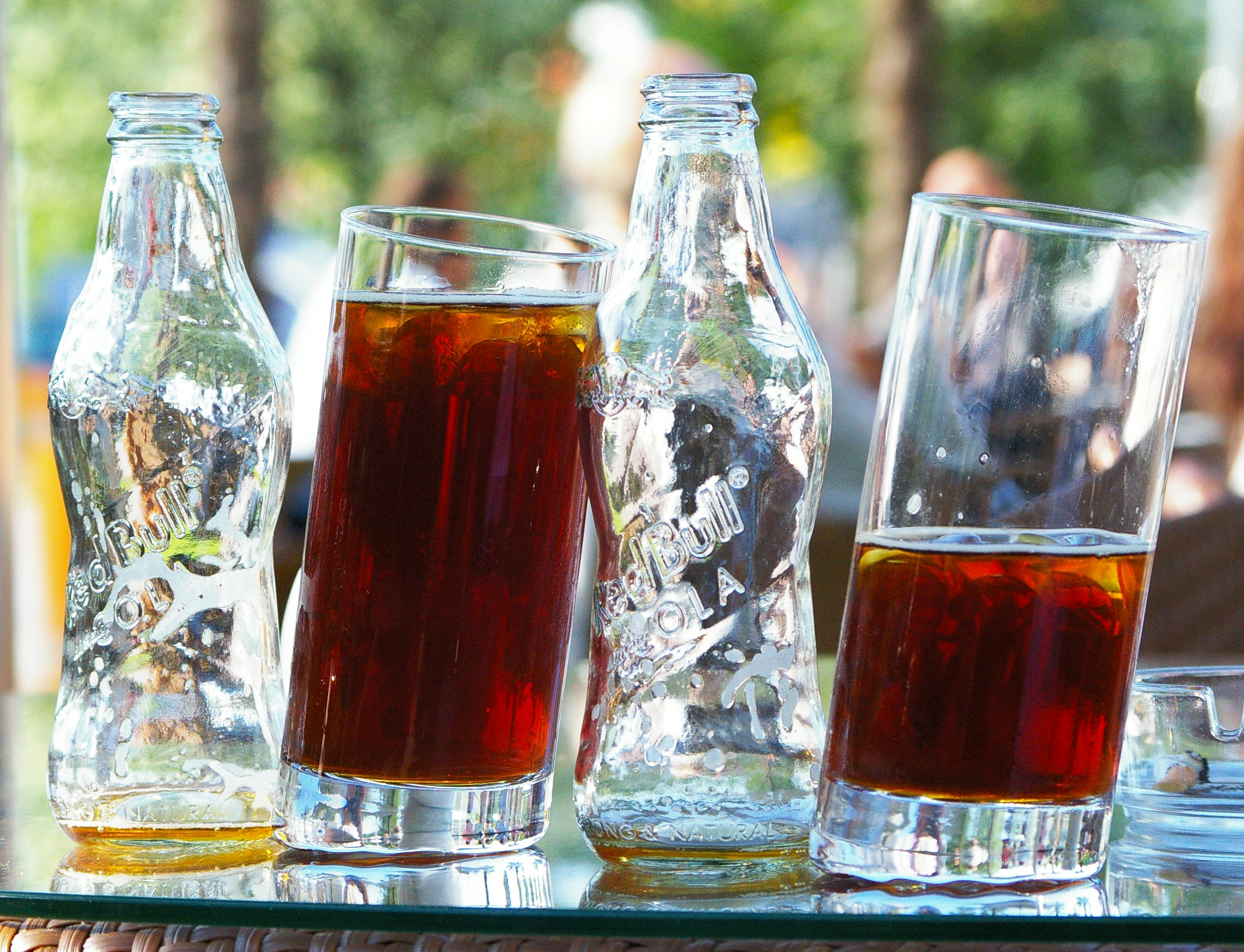
Glasses of USA Red Bull Cola

This is a list of soft drinks in order of the brand's country of origin. A soft drink is a beverage that typically contains water (often carbonated water), a sweetener and a flavoring agent. The sweetener may be sugar, high-fructose corn syrup, fruit juice, sugar substitutes (in the case of diet drinks) or some combination of these. Soft drinks may also contain caffeine, colorings, preservatives and other ingredients.

Soft drinks that are sold in more than one country are listed in this article only under their country of origin.

== Albania ==
- Aranxhata – Orange soft drink
- ivi albania - many taste soft drink

== Afghanistan ==
Pamir Cola Group of Companies

- Pamir Cola Shafa – energy drink
- Pamir Cola – cola flavoured soft drink
- Pamir Mountain – lemon flavoured soft drink
- Pamir Cola Light – cola flavoured soft drink
- Pamir Cola Orange – orange flavored soft drink
- Pamir Cola Lemon – lemon flavoured soft drink
- Shafa Pomegranate Drink
- Pamir Lemonade – lemon flavoured soft drink

== Algeria ==
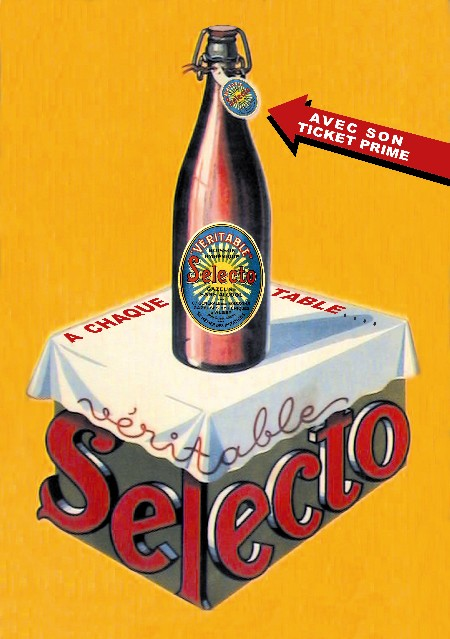
An 1889 Hamoud Boualem advertisement

- Hamoud Boualem – soda brand that includes many flavours
- NCA Rouiba – Juice brand that includes many flavours
- Tchina – Juice- Group Cevital
- Xtra Power Energy Drink
- Ifri Gazouz
- Ifri Cola
- Ifruit
- Azro
- Izem Energy

== Argentina ==
- Aquarius
- Apla
- Bidu Cola
- Cabalgata
- Chañi
- Chinchibirra
- Cunnington
- Doble Cola
- Goliat
- Manaos
- Neuss
- Pastore
- Pindy
- Pritty
- Rocket Fuel – energy drink
- Rad-60 – energy drink
- Blue Demon – energy drink
- Speed Unlimited – energy drink
- Secco (soft drink)
- Ser
- Spring Up
- Torasso
- Tradicional de Secco Secco
- Tubito
- Villa del Sur Levité

== Armenia ==
- Jermuk - mineral water
- Hay Cola – Armenian carbonated soft drinks with fruit flavours
- Sipan - Carbonated soft drinks
- 16 classic - energy drink

== Australia ==
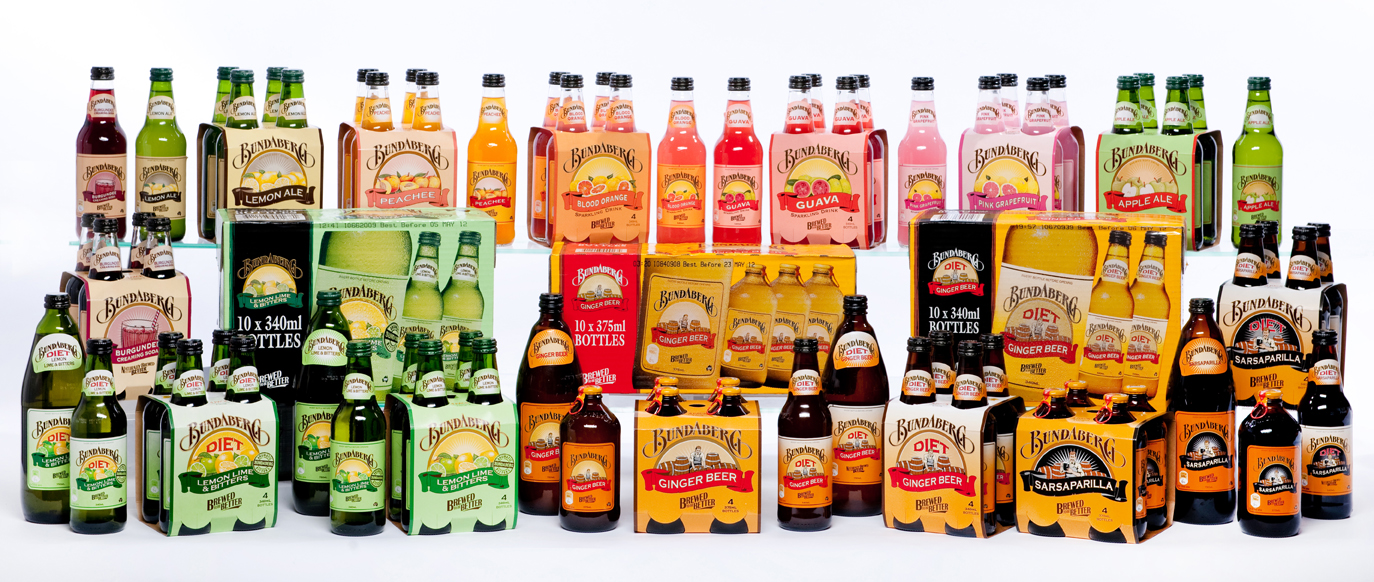
Bundaberg Brewed Drinks brands

- Back o' Bourke Cordials – Range of popular drinks including Splashe Cola sold throughout north-west New South Wales.
- BCX Royal Standard - A brand that was heavily marketed in central Victoria in the 1960s and 1970s
- Berts Soft Drinks – A "family tradition since 1893" - founded and still operated by the Shelley family, formerly of Shelleys Soft Drinks fame. Located in Sutherland Shire, Sydney
- Bickford's – full line of juices, sodas, teas, and bottled water
- Bundaberg – family owned producer of Bundaberg Ginger Beer along with other tradition and fruit focused soft drinks.
- Cascade – Quality Mixers, Soda and Cordials. Established in Tasmania, 1886.
- Cohns – Another brand popular in central Victoria in the 1960s and 1970s.
- Cooks Soft Drinks – A family owned business in Pittsworth on the Darling Downs. Producers of Cooks and Dads ranges of old style soft drinks.
- Cottee's – brand of cordial drinks, owned by previously Cadbury-Schweppes, now Schweppes Australia
- Count Cola – now discontinued brand of soda
- Crows Nest Soft Drinks – Crows Nest, just north of Toowoomba, one of the oldest in Australia, est. 1903
- Crystal – discontinued line of soft drinks, renowned for selling via their home delivery service. Later acquired by Cadbury Schweppes.
- Gest – line of sodas purchased by Coca-Cola Amatil and merged with Kirks
- Golden Circle – brand of carbonated beverages
- Hartz Tasmania
- Kirks – line of sodas marketed by Coca-Cola Amatil
- Ladd's cordials
- LA Ice Cola – cola available in four varieties
- Leed – carbonated lemonade
- Lido
- Loys – a home delivered soft drink company, mainly in Victoria and South Australia. Incorporated into Slades.
- McSars
- McMahons soft drinks – popular family run soft drink company in Ipswich West Street, Queensland from 1934 to the late 80s, founded by Frank McMahon
- Marchants – another defunct brand of soft drinks sold in Queensland, New South Wales, Victoria and South Australia until the turn of the 21st century.
- Orfords – popular Toowoomba softdrink maker 1923–1989 – diversified into refrigerated merchandising cabinets and ceased softdrink production
- Passiona – passionfruit-flavoured soft drink available previously from Cadbury-Schweppes, now Schweppes Australia
- PipeLime
- Port Of Echuca
- Pub Squash
- River Port Beverages – Founded in 1899 in Echuca, Victoria most well-known for Portello.
- Saxbys Soft Drinks – Australia's oldest family owned and operated soft drink company, based in Taree est. 1864
- Solo – lemon-flavoured drink, owned by Schweppes Australia.
- Schweppes – a range of mineral water/fruit juice drinks developed in Australia, with flavours that include orange-mango, and lemon, lime and orange.
- Shelleys – founded in Broken Hill in 1893 as a family operated soft drink company, popular in New South Wales. Later acquired by Coca-Cola Amatil and eventually merged into the Kirks brand. The Shelley family also later founded Berts Soft Drinks
- Slades (1860–present) – Still produces a variety of niche flavours as well as contract manufacture for retailers private labels.
- Swing – Popular up until the late 1970s, Swing specialised in weekly home deliveries of glass bottles in wooden crates which are now collector's items. Used bottles were collected the following week, cleaned and reused.
- Tarax – A mainly Victorian brand that had a big presence before being merged with Schweppes. Still available as a bottom end supermarket brand.
- Top End Soft Drinks – Northern Territory brand of soft drinks
- Weaver and Lock – Western Australian brand of soft drinks now defunct.
- Whitbreads Cordials – Charters Towers, North Queensland – Locally owned and family operated business since 1896 and still servicing North Queensland today.
- Wimmers Soft Drinks – Queensland soft drink brand owned by Noosa Beverages Pty Ltd.
- Woodroofe 'Big Sars' – Sarsparilla, Sno Top, Lemonade, Portello and a range of fruit flavours.
- YY – Local soft drink brand based in Newcastle

== Austria ==
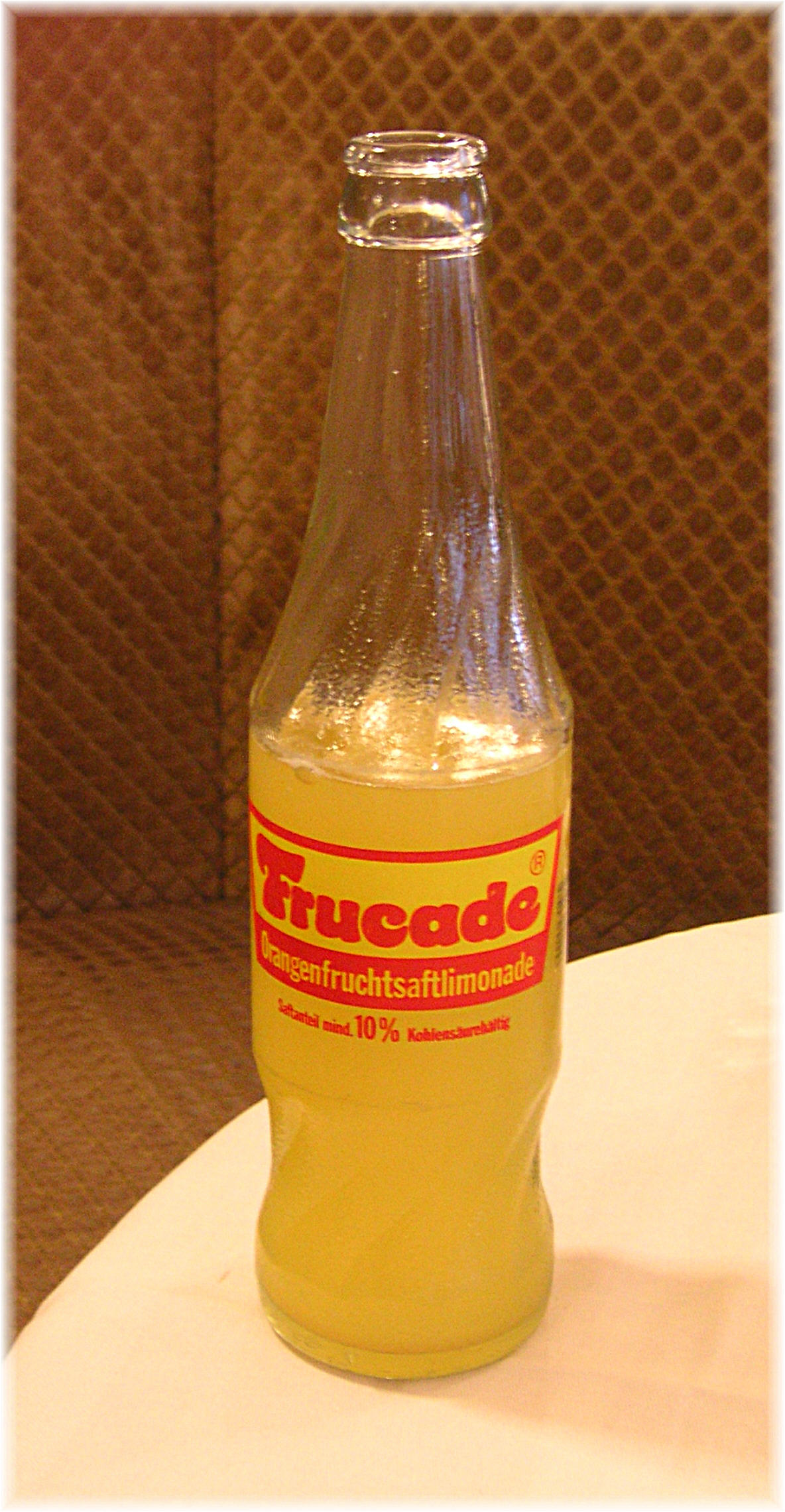
A bottle of Frucade (2005)

- Almdudler – herbal soda
- Blue Ox – energy drink
- Frucade – orange-flavoured soft drink
- Kracherl – lemon or raspberry-flavoured soda
- Lattella – whey-based line of juices available in nine flavours
- Pago
- Power Horse
- Red Bull – popular energy drink distributed globally by Red Bull GmbH
- Red Bull Cola – cola from Red Bull GmbH
- Rushh – energy drink introduced in 2002 by Rushh Gmbh
- Dark Dog – energy drink

== Azerbaijan ==
- Qızıl Quyu – carbonated drinks brand
- Flaming Baku – carbonated drinks brand
- A+CO - energy drink brand
- Gəncə Cola - carbonated drinks brand
- Sweet Star - carbonated drinks brand
- Hoqqa - carbonated drinks brand
- Bizon Energy - energy drink brand
- GO Energy - energy drink brand
- Refreshhh! - energy drink brand
- Turbin - energy drink brand

== Bahamas ==
- Goombay – locally available, champagne cola and pineapple-lemon flavoured soda
- Island Queen – locally available, coconut-infused water
- Junkanoo – locally available, lemon-lime soda produced by PepsiCo

== Bangladesh ==
Akij Group

- Lemu (soft drink) – lemon-lime soda
- Mojo (soft drink) – cola drink
- Clemon – clear lime soda
- Twing – orange soda

Pran Food Ltd.

- Pran Up – lime soda
- Pran Maxx Cola – cola flavoured soft drink
- Pran Maxx Lemon – clear lime carbonated beverage
- Pran Maxx Orange – orange flavors soft drink
- Power – energy drink
- Pran Zeera Pani

Fresh Group

- Fresh Cola – cola drink
- Fresh Up – lime soda
- Fresh Mejanda
- Fresh Googly – orange flavors soft drink
- Fresh Mojito – lemon flavoured soft drink
- Fresh Lychee – lychee flavoured soft drink
- Gear – energy drink

Globe Soft Drinks

- Uro Cola – cola
- Uro Lemon – lemon flavoured soft drink
- Uro Orange – orange soda
- Fizz up – clear lime soft drink
- Lychena – lychee flavoured soft drink
- Royal Tiger – energy drink
- Black Horse – energy drink
- Mangolee – mango flavor soft drink
- Oranjee – orange soda
- Lemonjee – lemon flavor soft drink

Deshbandhu Group

- Deshbondhu Cola
- Deshbondhu Lemon
- Deshbondhu Friends Up
- Deshbondhu Honey Ginger
- Deshbondhu Orange Drink
- Deshbondhu Lychee
- Deshbondhu Zeera Pani
- Friends Cola – cola drink
- Guru – energy drink

== Barbados ==
- Frutee
- Plus

== Belgium ==
- Frutonic – juice-like soft drink
- Nalu
- Lipton Ice-tea (sparkling)
- Yazoo – flavoured milkshake made by FrieslandCampina
- Cécémel – flavored milk.
- Drink a Flower - Natural soft drinks

== Bermuda ==
- Barritt's Ginger Beer – ginger beer bottled by John Barritt & Son Ltd. since 1874

== Bolivia ==
- Coca Brynco – made with extracts of coca leaves

== Bosnia and Herzegovina ==
- Sky Cola – Cola made with water from Kiseljak
- Sarajevski Kiseljak – mineral water
- Sensation – carbonated drinks brand

== Brazil ==
- Artemis Guaraná – various flavours, from Patos de Minas, since 1959
- CINI
- Convenção
- Dolly
- Esportivo
- Fruki
- Gengibirra – lemon and ginger soda
- Goianinho Guaraná
- Guaraná Amazônia
- Guaraná Antarctica – popular guarana-flavoured soft drink, created in 1921
- Guaraná Charrua
- Guaraná Coroa
- Guaraná Jesus – guarana-flavoured soft drink, has a pink color and cinnamon aroma
- Guaraná Kuat
- Guaraná Pureza – guarana-flavoured soft drink from Leonardo Sell's company
- Guaraná Taí
- Mate Couro
- Mineirinho (soft drink)
- Primo Schincariol – line of sodas in seven flavours from Primo Schincariol
- Pepsi Antarctica
- Fruthos – brand of fruit juices in cartons from Primo Schincariol
- Guaraná Schin – guarana-flavoured soft drink from Primo Schincariol
- Itubaína – tutti-frutti soft drink from Primo Schincariol
- Skinka – energy drink from Primo Schincariol
- São Geraldo – cashew flavoured soft drink, in Juazeiro do Norte, Ceará
- Soda Antarctica
- Sukita
- Teem
- Tubaína
- Pon Chic
- Guarapan

== Bulgaria ==
- Mihalkovo Mineral Water
- Airan – yogurt and water
- Hisar Mineral Water
- Altai - Tee drink
- Aspasia (soft drink)
- Etar (soft drink)

== Canada ==
- Bec Cola – a brand of organic cola made in Québec
- Big 8 – a brand of cola and bottled water distributed by Sobeys, based in the town of Stellarton, near New Glasgow, Nova Scotia, Canada.
- Brio Chinotto Brio is manufactured by National Dry Beverages, previously known as Mio Manufacturing, with their head office in Toronto, Ontario, Canada.
- Bull's Head - Best known for their ginger ale. Produced in Quebec's Eastern Townships
- Canada Dry – A very popular brand of ginger ale, but many other soft drinks from the company are available.
- Canadian Gold Sparkling Waters – also available in flavours "sugar-free" bottled at source Marchand, Manitoba
- Cannonball Soda – made by Garrison Brewery in Halifax, Nova Scotia
- Cott Beverages – The world's largest bottler of private-label soft drinks. Once primarily known for Cott Black Cherry soda and other flavours sold under its own name. At one time, they used the slogan "It's Cott to be good!". The company is headquartered in Tampa, Florida, and services residential and commercial customers across the United States, Canada, Europe, and Israel.
- Clearly Canadian – sparkling water available in many flavours, manufactured in Gormley, Ontario
- Eskimo Soft Drinks – a kosher brand of soft drinks distributed by home delivery in Montreal and Toronto, through the late 1970s
- Grace Island Soda - Caribbean inspired flavors based in Richmond Hill, Ontario available in ten flavors
- Freshie – drink mix available in 5 flavours, discontinued in the 1980s
- Ice Castle – private label soft drink brand of the defunct Steinberg's supermarket chain. Notable for selling cans without pop tops long after they became industry standard.
- KIK Cola – a now-defunct brand of cola once very popular, especially in Quebec
- Life – Shoppers Drug Mart brand
- Marco Spruce Beer
- Spruce Beer – a spruce-flavoured carbonated drink particularly popular in Quebec
- Mr. Goudas
- Pic A Pop – nostalgic brand of soda, currently available in 11 flavours made in Marchand, Manitoba since 1971
- Pop Shoppe – brand of soda available in eight flavours
- President's Choice – private label soft drinks line sold in supermarkets owned by Loblaw Companies Limited. PC Cola comes in two varieties, red label and blue label.
- Propeller Brewery – small brewery that also makes a small line of soda including Cream Soda, Ginger Beer, and Root Beer
- RELOAD – energy drink
- Red Champagne – local soft drink from Saguenay Lac-Saint-Jean, Quebec
- Seaman's Beverages - defunct company, now sold by Pepsi mostly in Prince Edward Island
- Slow Cow – an "anti-energy" drink from Slow Cow Drink Inc.
- Sussex Golden Ginger Ale – a "golden" ginger ale originally bottled in the town of Sussex, New Brunswick; sold in Canada's Maritime Provinces and northern areas in the state of Maine.
- Temagami Dry - brand Ginger Ale and Scotch Cream Soda drinks – available in Northern Ontario, named after the Temagami wilderness area in Northeastern Ontario, bottled and produced by Fortier Beverages in Cochrane, Ontario.
- TOUCH – "Sugar Free" flavoured Sparkling Mineral Water, brand owned by Canadian Gold Beverages (2012) Golden Medal best Tasting Mineral water in the World 4x times
- Vrroom – brand of fruit flavoured sport drinks and thirst quenching slush

== Chile ==
- Bilz y Pap – red-colored soft drink, available in regular and diet versions.
- Kem - pineapple-flavored soft drink, available in regular and diet versions.
- Sorbete Letelier - local cherry-flavored soft drink. Each bottle has a natural cherry inside.

== China ==
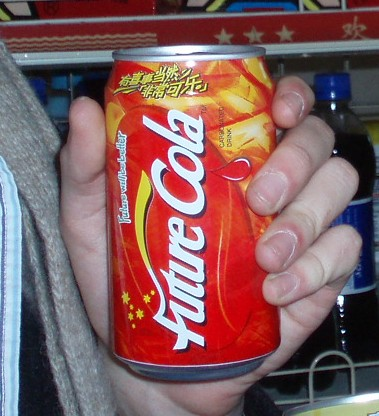
A can of Future Cola (2006)

- Asia – by Xiangxue Pharmaceuticals
- Beibingyang – Beijing-based orange flavored soft drink
- Future Cola – known in China as Future Cola, marketed by the Hangzhou Wahaha Group
- Huiyuan – produced in Henan Province sold under the name Juizee Pop
- Ice Peak – produced in Xi'an city, Shaanxi province
- Jianlibao – orange flavored soft drink
- Laoshan Cola – produced using waters from Mt. Laoshan in Shandong province
- Nongfu Spring water – a spring water beverage based in Hangzhou in Zhejiang Province
- Smart – Coca-Cola Company; soft drinks of various fruit flavours such as apple, watermelon, grape, peach, coconut, etc.

== Colombia ==
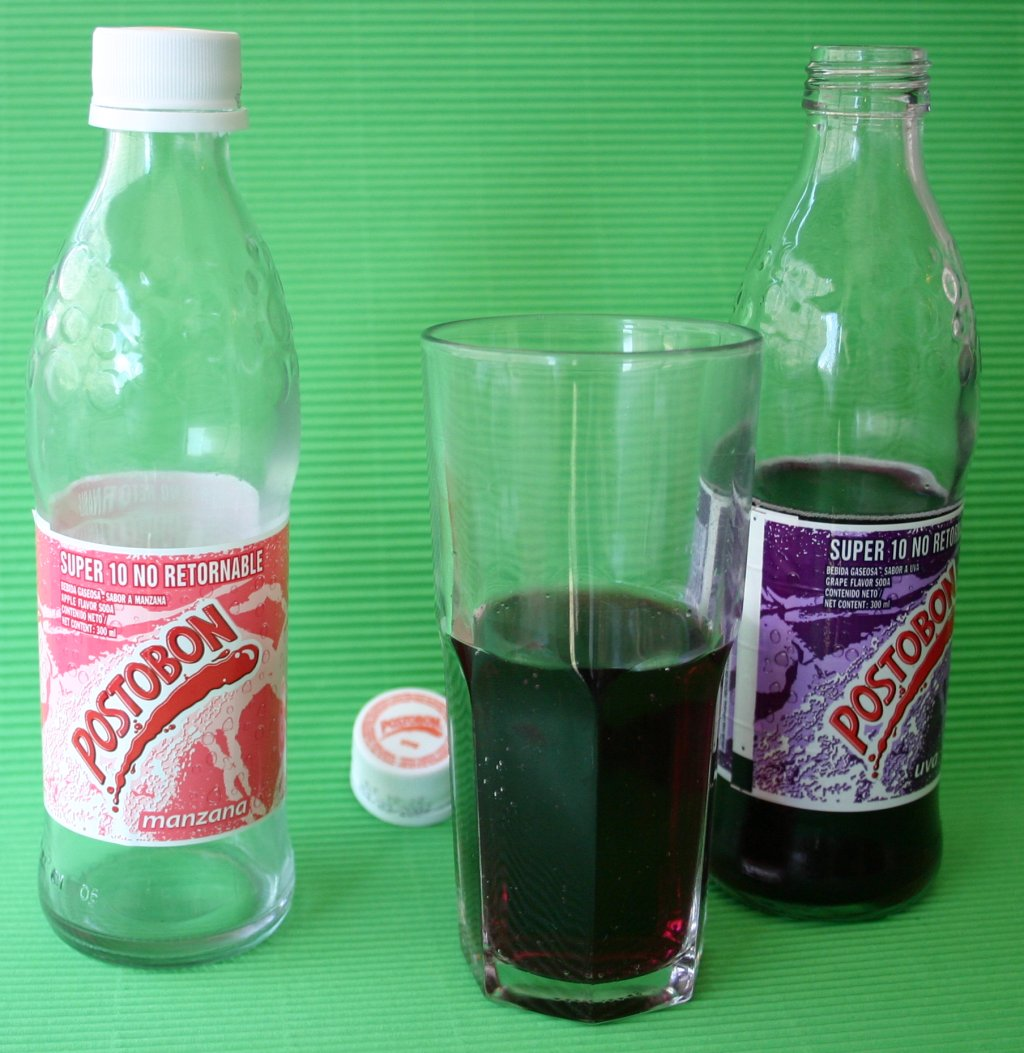
Postobón soft drinks

- Colombiana – kola champagne produced by Postobon S.A.
- Cristal – bottled water and seltzer water produced by Postobon S.A.
- Gaseosas Pool
- Gaseosas Cóndor
- Gaseosas la Cigarra – Nariño based bottling plant with famous champagne and lemonade soda.
- Gaseosas Glacial
- Gaseosas Hipinto
- Gaseosas Sol
- Hit – brand of juices marketed by Postobon S.A.
- Kola Román – red-colored soft drink
- Pony Malta – carbonated, malt beverage
- Postobón – line of carbonated drinks in five fruit flavours from Postobon S.A.
- Malta Leona

== Democratic Republic of the Congo ==
- Festa Soft drinks - Festa Grenadine, Festa Orange, Festa Pineapple, Festa Cola (contains extracts of coca leaves), Festa Tangawizi and Festa Lemon

== Costa Rica ==
- Kola La Mundial – brand of cola drink
- Zarza La Mundial – brand of root beer
- Big cola - brand of cola and ginger ale drinks
- Cotuba - brand of guarana-flavoured soda

== Croatia ==
- Pasareta – mandarin-fruit punch flavoured soda
- Cedevita – carbonated drinks brand
- Pipi – orange soft drink
- Jamnica – carbonated drinks brand
- Cetina – mineral water
- Pro Sport
- Toco
- Juicy

== Cuba ==
- Gaseosa – lemon-lime drink by Ciego Montero
- Iron Beer
- Jupiña – pineapple soda
- Malta – drink made with malt
- TuKola – Cuban cola brand by Ciego Montero
- Materva – Cuban mate-based soft sweet drink

== Czech Republic ==
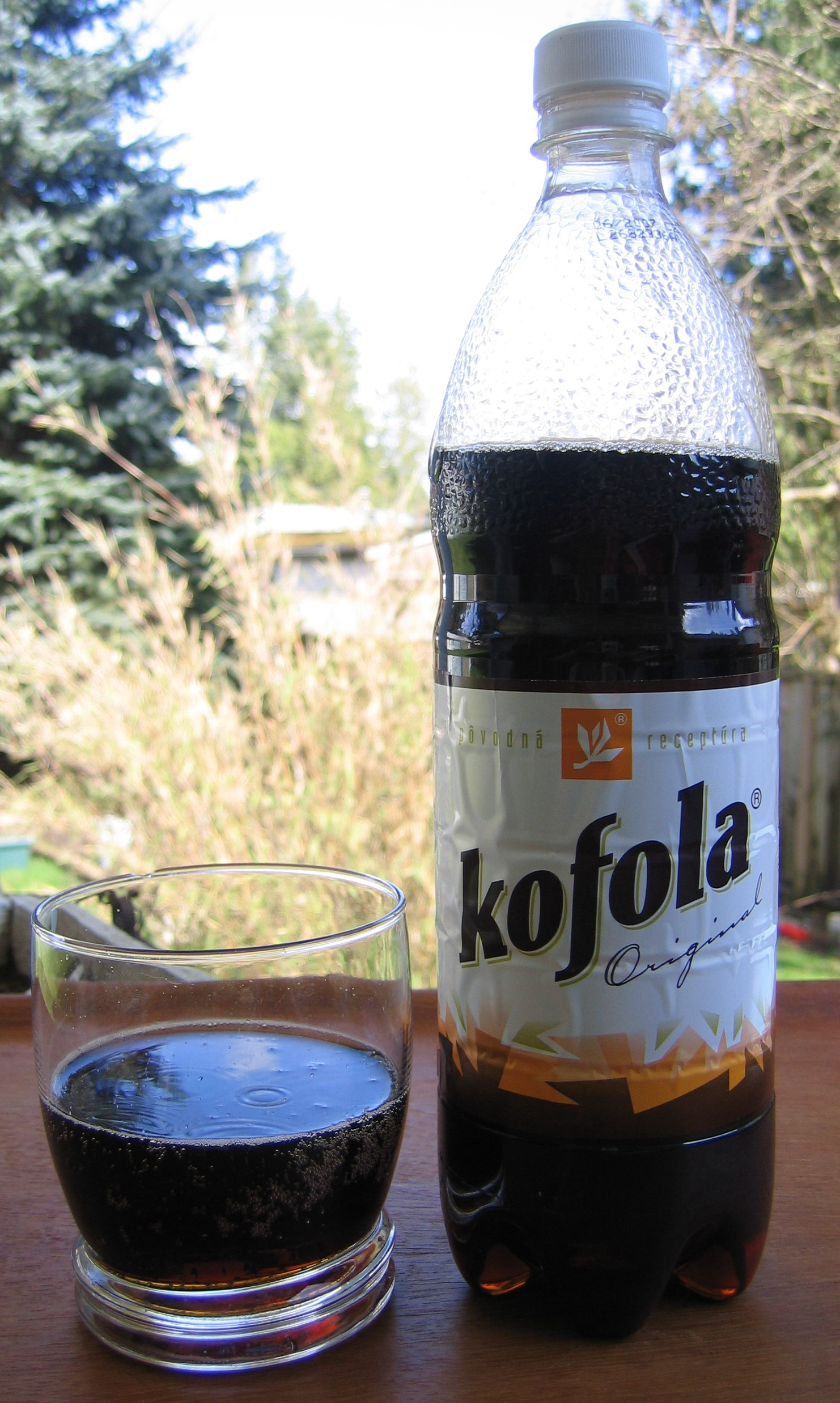
Kofola

- Kofola – popular cola
- Semtex – energy drink
- ZON – soft drink
- Karáskova Limonáda – soft drink with different flavours
- Poděbradka – flavoured mineral water
- Prolinie – flavoured mineral water

== Denmark ==
- Carlsberg Sport
- CULT Energy Drink
- Dansk Citronvand – carbonated lemonade
- Faxe Kondi – lemon-lime sports drink
- Jolly Cola – brand of cola founded by Dansk Coladrik in 1959
- Harboe – brand of soda with different flavours
- Maribo
- Nikoline appelsinvand
- Squash appelsinvand
- Supermalt
- X-ray energydrink

== Dominican Republic ==
- Country Club
- Red Rock Cola

== Ecuador ==
- Fioravanti – fruity, carbonated soft drink available in strawberry or apple
- Fruit – soft drink – Famous old brand, available in many flavours, famous mascot Albertinho Dos Santos is very popular
- Frukiss Soda – limited availability, and only in the central region of Ecuador
- Jean Cola – available only in the coastal region
- Kola Gallito – very similar to the Coca-Cola-owned brand Inca Kola
- Manzana – apple flavoured sparkling soda
- Quintuples – fruit flavoured soda, available in many flavours
- Tropical (soft drink) – strawberry flavoured sparkling soda
- Orangine – blackberry juice with soda, traditional in Quito.

== Egypt ==
- Spiro Spathis – Carbonated soft drink famous for being continuously produced since its invention 100 years ago.
- Juhayna – Juhayna Food Industries are famous for producing many different types of juices which have a large foothold on the Egyptian market.
- "Sina Cola". 16 September 2024. – A 2008 carbonated soft drink company that also offers malt drinks. Popularity increased due to the 2023 boycotts of Israel.

== El Salvador ==
- Kolashanpan
- Salva-Cola

== Estonia ==
- Blue Sheep More Hito – Lime and mint-flavoured soft drink produced by A. Le Coq with the motto Lammastele keelatud!, or Not allowed for sheep!.
- Buratino – Apple and lemon-flavoured soft drink produced by Tallinn Soft Drinks LTD Co.
- Düšess – (Duchesse) Pear and soft drink coloured with caramel and produced by Tallinn Soft Drinks LTD Co.
- Kelluke – (Campanula) Clear, lime-flavoured soft drink produced since 1965 produced by A. Le Coq, known as Tartu Eksperimentaal Õlletehas (Experimental Brewery of Tartu) back then.
- Limonaad Traditsiooniline – One of the oldest surviving soft drinks in Estonia. The recipe was composed in 1936 by Georgian Mitrofan Lagidze, and the lemonade has been produced by A. Le Coq since 1946.
- Lumivalgeke – (Snow White) Lemon and lime-flavoured soft drink produced by Tallinn Soft Drinks LTD Co.
- Mõmmi Limonaad – (Bear Cub's Lemonade)
- Punane Sõstar – (Red currant) Red currant-flavoured soft drink produced by A. Le Coq since 1969.
- Valge Klaar – (White Transparent) Apple-flavoured soft drink produced by A. Le Coq since 1976.
- Hull Õun – (Crazy Apple) Apple and cola-flavoured soft drink produced by A. Le Coq since 2005, discontinued not long after and brought back in 2017.

== Fiji ==
- Tarumba
- Sunrise Orange drink
- Raro
- Coconut drinks
- Kava

== Finland ==
- Battery – energy drink marketed by Sinebrychoff
- Bratz Vadelma – raspberry flavoured Bratz-brand drink by Olvi
- Fenix – health drink brand by Hartwall
- Hart-Sport - sports drink developed by Hartwall
- Hyvää Päivää – health drink brand by Sinebrychoff
- Jaffa – soft drink brand sold by Hartwall since the 1940s
- La Rita – orange lemonade by Laitilan Wirvoitusjuomatehdas
- Lemona – lemonade by Laitilan Wirvoitusjuomatehdas
- Messina – blood orange lemonade by Laitilan Wirvoitusjuomatehdas
- Muumi – woodland strawberry soft drink by Sinebrychoff
- Olvi – produces Olvi Ananas (pineapple soft drink), Olvi Cola, Olvi Greippi (grapefruit soft drink), Olvi Hedelmä (mixed fruit soft drink), Olvi Jaffa (orange soft drink) and Olvi Lemon (lemon soft drink), Olvi Omena (apple soft drink)
- Omenalimonadi – apple soft drink by Hartwall
- Omenapore – remake of one of the two oldest Finnish soft drinks by Nokian Panimo
- Pirkka-cola – Kesko store brand cola
- Puolukkapore – lingonberry soft drink by Nokian Panimo
- Päärynälimonadi – pear soft drink by Hartwall
- Pommac – oak barrel maturated soft drink, first made in 1914, now by Hartwall
- Rainbow-cola – S Group store brand cola
- Rio Cola – cola by Laitilan Wirvoitusjuomatehdas
- Rio Rita – raspberry soft drink by Laitilan Wirvoitusjuomatehdas
- Sittis – remake of one of the two oldest Finnish lemonades by Nokian Panimo
- SitruunaSooda – remake of one of the two oldest Finnish lemonades by Laitilan Wirvoitusjuomatehdas
- Smurffi – pear flavoured The Smurfs-brand soft drink
- Teho – Many varieties of energy drinks.
- Turtles Päärynä – pear flavoured Turtles-brand soft drink
- Vadelmalimonadi – raspberry soft drink by Hartwall

== France ==
- Auvergnat cola – regional cola introduced in 2009
- Badoit – French brand of mineral water
- Breizh Cola – regionally available cola
- Cristaline – French brand of source water
- Corsica Cola – regional cola introduced in 2003
- Gini – lemon soft drink distributed by Cadbury Schweppes
- Joker – brand of juices available in many varieties
- La Mortuacienne – artisanal lemonade produced by maison Rième
- Liptonic – tea carbonated soft drink
- Lorina – fruity, carbonated soft drink available in six flavours
- Mecca-Cola – Muslim-directed cola produced by the Mecca Cola World Company
- Oasis – fruity multi flavor juices
- Orangina – orange flavoured fizzy drink
- Perrier – naturally-carbonated mineral water bottled in distinctive green bottles by the Nestlé Corporation
- Pschitt – lemon and orange soda available from the Neptune Group
- Ricqlès – mint-flavoured soft drink
- Tropico – fruity multi flavor juices. Slogan: "Quand c'est trop, c'est Tropico!"

== Georgia ==
- Tarkhuna – Tarragon flavoured soda
- Lagidze water – varieties of flavoured soft drinks
- Duchess – pear-flavoured soda
- Natakhtari – carbonated drinks brand

== Germany ==
- 28 BLACK – Natural Energy Drink
- Afri-Cola – cola with a high caffeine level – 25 mg/100ml
- Almdudler
- Apfelschorle – carbonated mineral water and apple juice
- Bionade – lemonade-like non-alcoholic soft drink
- Bluna – an orange soft drink
- Brottrunk – traditional healthy beverage made from bread, much like kvass
- Capri-Sonne – many flavours of juice sold in silver pouches
- Club Cola – introduced in 1967 in East Germany
- Club Mate – Mate Tea Soda
- Dark Thunder – carbonated energy drink from Aldi
- Deit – lemonade
- Effect – energy drink
- Fanta – line of fruit-flavoured drinks, available around the world
- Fassbrause – spiced fruit-flavour soft drink
- Fritz-Kola
- Gerolsteiner – a naturally–carbonated mineral water
- Hermann-Kola – brand of cola with a high level of caffeine
- K-Fee – coffee and energy drinks
- Karamalz – caramel or lemon-flavoured soft drink
- Libella
- Mezzo Mix – orange-flavoured cola from Coca-Cola
- MioMioMate
- OstMost
- Premium-Cola – line of sodas made in protest of changes to Afri-Cola
- Red Thunder – carbonated energy drink from Aldi
- Rhino's Energy – energy drink
- Schwip Schwap – a half-orange lemonade/half-cola drink by Pepsi, similar to Spezi
- Sprite – introduced in 1959 as Fanta Klare Zitrone (Clear Lemon Fanta), rebranded as Sprite in the United States in 1961
- Sinalco – lemonade
- Spezi – the original half-orange lemonade/half-cola drink by Brewery Riegele
- Vita Cola – available in a Pur, Original and other flavours
- Gletscher Cola – organic and fair-trade brand of cola with raw cane sugar, guarana and herbs manufactured in Baden-Württemberg
- zX Cola – carbonated cola flavour drink from Aldi
- LamaTee – Mate Lemonade produced by REWE

== Gibraltar ==
- Brand "5" – carbonated soft drink available in raspberry and lemon flavour

== Greece ==
- Epsa – line of soft drinks, teas, and juices
- Three Cents – line of artisanal soft drinks
- Green Cola
- Vikos – line of artisanal soft drinks and tea
- Loux – line of artisanal soft drinks and tea
- VAP – line of artisanal soft drinks
- Amita – brand of fruit juices (The Coca-Cola Company)

== Guatemala ==
- Tiky

== Haiti ==
- Aquafine Blue Naturelle – spring water purified by reverse osmosis and ozonized by Tropic SA
- Big Shake – protein shake in Vanilla, Strawberry and Chocolate by Tropic SA
- Cola Couronne – fruit champagne by the Brasserie de la Couronne
- Cola Lacaye – available fruit champagne, banana, and fruit by the Brooklyn Bottling Group
- Crystal Sources – ozonized pure mineral water by BRANA
- Fiesta – soda available in citrus, grape and cola champagne by Tropic SA
- King Cola – available in banana, strawberry, grape, and cola champagne by BRANA
- Limonade – cola, also available in citrus flavor by the Brasserie de la Couronne
- Malta H – malt by BRANA
- Megawatt – energy drink by Tropic SA
- Ragaman – energy drink by Tropic SA
- Robusto – malt by Tropic SA
- Tampico – juice by Tropic SA
- Tampico Soda – by Tropic SA
- TORO – energy drink by BRANA
- Tropic – juice by Tropic SA
- Frucano Juice

== Honduras ==
- Copan Dry

== Hong Kong ==
- Vitasoy
- Tao Ti
- Yeung Gwong

== Hungary ==
- Almuska
- Bambi – oldest Hungarian brand, started in 1947. Today produced as a speciality.
- Büki
- Deit
- Et-Üd – produced between 1970 and 1979, it had a variety of forest themed flavours
- Rorange
- Extra
- Frutti – was made by Dietrich Emil és Gottschlig József starting in 1865, with a company called DIT-GOT
- Gyöngy
- Hajdú
- Hell Energy Drink - produced in Szikszó in Borsod county.
- Hüsi
- Kati
- Márka – another product of the company that makes Traubisoda – in raspberry, sour cherry, grape and orange flavours
- Oázis
- Olympi Cola
- Olympos
- Pataki
- Queen
- Róna – First produced in the 1970s, then reappeared in 2009, produced in three cities: Debrecen, Sopron and Csány
- Rorange
- Salgó – produced in the city of Salgótarján.
- Sárközi
- Sió
- Szivügy – It is an abbreviation for "Szénsavas Italok, Vizek és Üdítők Gyára" that means Factory of carbonated drinks, waters and refreshments. The brand was always promoted with a heart, because Szív means heart. The end of the abbreviation "ügy" means cause or matter. Szívügy = Heart cause. Not produced any more, bottles can only be found as antiques.
- Szöcske Kóla - It is still produced today
- Sztár – started in 1971 and produced until the early 199X
- Traubisoda – one of the most famous Hungarian brands – grape flavour
- Tutti Juice - energy drink
- Utas – made by MÁV from 1959
- Viking
- Vitis
- Xixo – iced tea, lemonade and flavoured mineral water, produced in Hell Energy's factory.
- Zselic – produced in Kaposvár, regional small company

== Iceland ==
- Appelsín – orange soda
- Malt Extrakt
- Mix
- Orka
- Collab – energy drink derived from recycled fish collagen

== India ==
- Appy – apple-flavoured drink by Parle Agro
- Appy Fizz – sparkling apple drink by Parle Agro
- Artos – regional soft drink from Andhra Pradesh available in grape, orange, lemon and carbonated water
- Campa Cola – popular Indian soda first introduced in 1977. Acquired by Reliance Retail in 2022.
- Davat – regional soft drink from Gujarat available in jeera soda, orange, lemon and carbonated water by Davat Beverages.
- Duke's Lemonade
- Duke's Mangola – mango drink from Dukes bought by PepsiCo
- Frooti – mango-flavoured drink from Parle Agro
- Gold Spot – orange flavoured carbonated drink
- Grappo Fizz – Grape-flavoured drink from Parle Agro
- Haldiram's
- Juicila – powdered soft drink concentrate available in orange, mango, lemon, cola, masala, jaljira
- Limca – lemon flavoured soda
- Maaza – mango drink from Parle Bisleri bought by Coca-Cola
- Pallonji – Flavoured soda mainly sold in Mumbai, established in 1865
- Paper Boat – Traditional Indian drink concoctions, produced by Hector Beverages Pvt Ltd in Gurgaon
- Rasna – powdered fruit flavoured, ready to mix drink. Available in orange, mango, lemon, grape and many other flavours
- Rooh Afza – sharbat produced by Hamdard Laboratories
- Sosyo – Sosyo is an Indian aerated drink, produced and marketed mainly in the western states of India by Hajoori and Sons, Surat.
- Thums Up

== Indonesia ==
- AdeS – brand of fruit juice
- F&N
- Fruity powder drink – pop drink product by Forisa Nusapersada
- Green Sands
- Hemaviton
- M150
- Nutrisari
- Piaw A&W Root Beer
- Sunkist
- Teh Botol Sosro
- Sarsi - Sarsapilla
- Badak
- temulawak Agung Ngoro
- Coffee Beer Agung Ngoro

== Iran ==
- Aab Zereshk – a traditional drink made of soaked dried berberis in cold water
- AshiMashi – soda available in three flavours from the AshiMashi Group
- Parsi Cola – produced by the Sasan Company
- Shadnoush – orange and lemon soda produced by the Sasan Company
- Sharbat – all different sorts, mostly made of cooked sugar + water, together with some sort of fruit for taste and aroma. Traditional sharbats include: Sharbat-e sekanjabin– cooked vinegar, sugar & mint, Sharbat-e beh limoo– quince, lime & sugar, Sharbat-e aab limoo – lime juice & sugar, Sharbat-e albaloo – sour cherry & sugar, Sharbat-e zaafaroon – saffron & sugar.
- Sherkat alice
- Tops
- Ushkaya – hardnes:42, produced by the Kosarnosh Kandovan Company
- Zamzam Cola

== Ireland ==
- BPM Energy
- Brown lemonade – popular lemonade variety in Ulster
- Cavan Cola – locally popular soft drink discontinued in 2001
- Cadet soft drinks
- Cidona – apple-flavoured soft drink
- Club (soft drink)
- Club Rock Shandy
- Country Spring, discontinued.
- Finches
- JaffO Juice Super Juice
- Lucozade Energy
- Maine Soft Drinks Ltd - based in Ballymoney, County Antrim
- McDaid's Football Special - now made by Maine Soft Drinks for James McDaid & Sons Ltd..
- MiWadi
- Red lemonade – traditional variant of lemonade
- Score
- Sports Special
- Tanora
- Tipperary Clearly
- TK
- White Lemonade – Irish name for Clear Lemonade

== Israel ==
- Growper - Organic carbonated soft drink
- Kristal
- Prigat – brand of juices available in 16 countries from Gat Foods
- Rozina's
- Spring
- Super Drink
- Tapuzina
- Tempo
- Zip
- Island
- Sprit - soft drink

== Italy ==
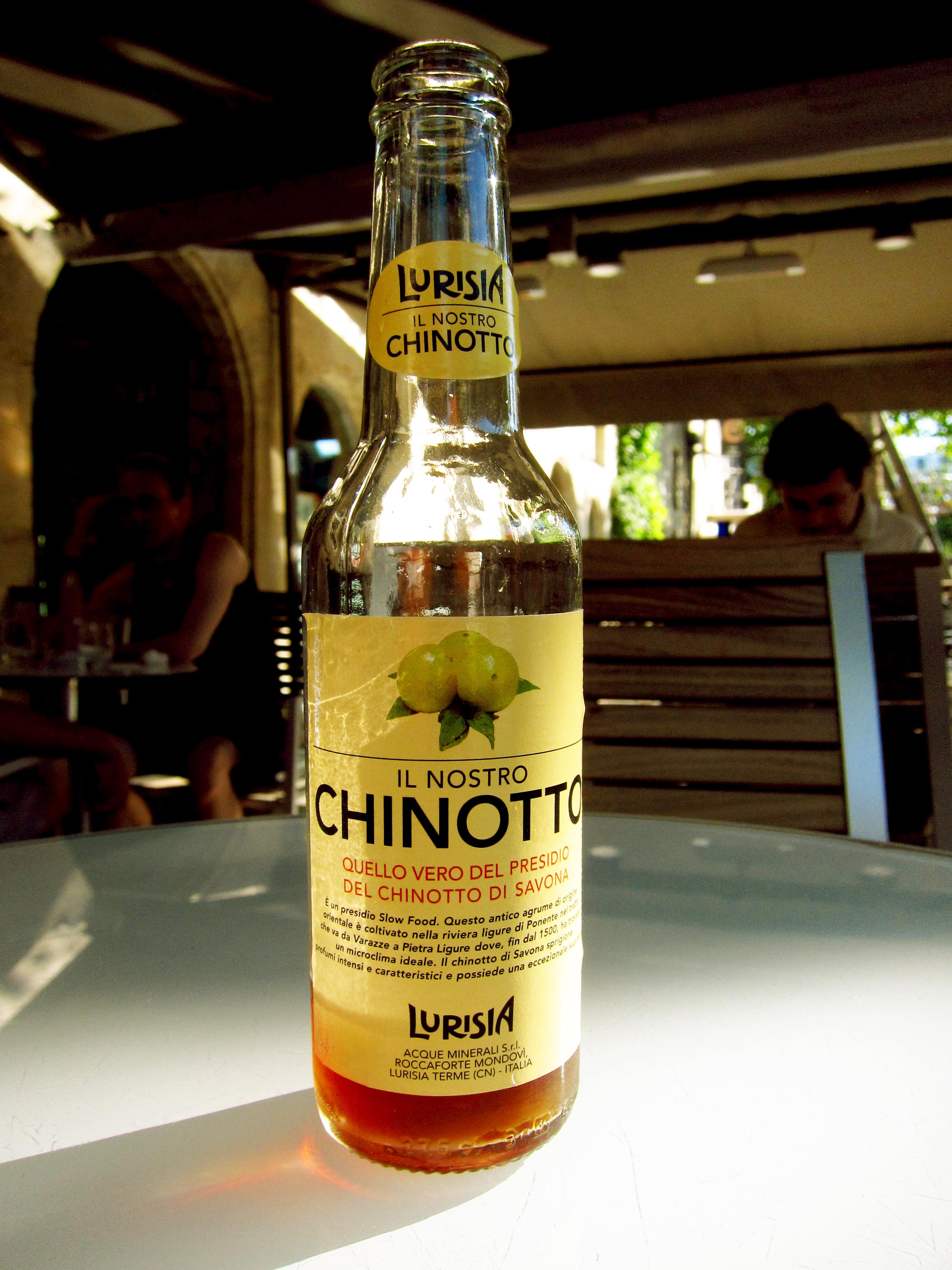
A bottle of Italian chinotto

- Brio Chinotto – A bitter tasting carbonated cola similar in flavor to tonic water
- Beverly – a bitter-tasting, carbonated drink from Coca-Cola
- Cedrata – Citron limonade
- Chinotto – traditional Italian cola made with the chinotto fruit
- Crodino – non-alcoholic aperitif distributed by the Campari Group
- Crodo – large line of mineral water, soda, juice, and iced tea distributed by the Campari Group
- Estathe produced by Ferrero spa
- Gingerino bitter ginger beverage usually served before lunch
- Lemonsoda – lemon-flavoured soda, along with Oransoda and Pelmosoda, distributed by the Campari Group
- San Benedetto - produces mineral water and soft drinks
- Limonata
- Sanbittèr San Pellegrino
- Sanbittèr Dry colourless carbonated non-alcoholic aperitif
- Stappj produced by Diorio spa
- Sterilgarda – Company natural fruit juices are served in Neos flights
- Gassosa – sweetened carbonated water
- Spuma

== Jamaica ==
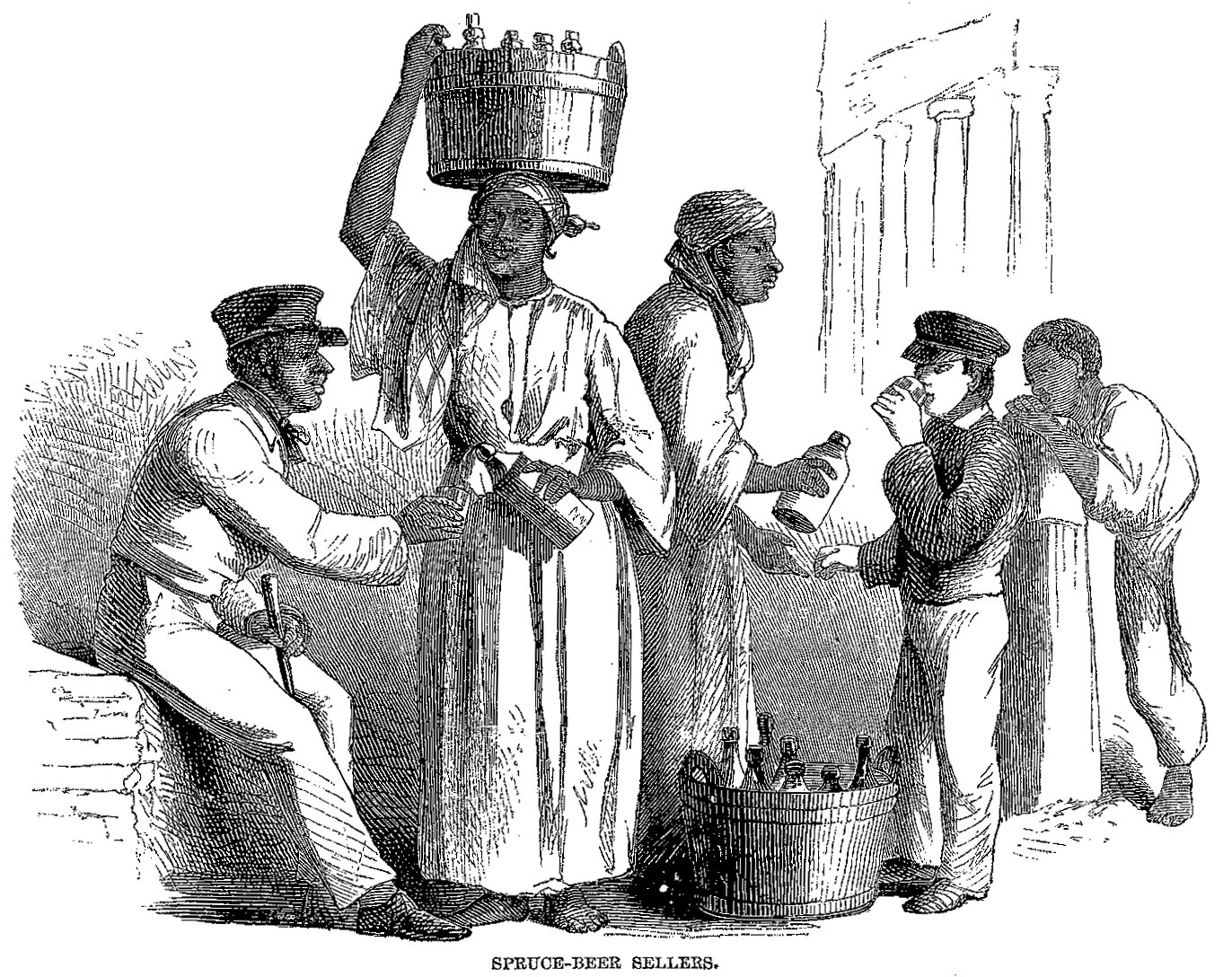
Spruce beer sellers in Jamaica, c. 1861

- Bigga – brand of carbonated soft drinks in various flavours
- Old Jamaica Ginger Beer
- Sorrel
- Ting

== Japan ==
=== Carbonated ===
- Asahi Soft Drinks
- Bubble Man – soft drink marketed by the Suntory Group, many varieties
- Calpis Soda – a carbonated variant of the Calpis drink listed below
- C.C. Lemon – marketed by Suntory, third most popular soda in Japan
- Chanmery – non alcoholic wine substitute
- Cheerio (drink) – brand of soda produced by the Cheerio Corporation, many flavours
- Hoppy (drink) – non-alcoholic beer substitute
- Ito En Fruits Soda
- Kirin Lemon
- Match (drink) – fruity soda with lemon and grapefruit flavors
- Mitsuya Cider – brand of sodas available in six flavours from Asahi Soft Drinks
- Oronamin C Drink – carbonated health drink produced by Otsuka Pharmaceutical Company
- Ramune – soda which comes in many flavors known for its unique bottle
- Sangaria
- Real Gold – carbonated energy drink from Coca-Cola

=== Coffee ===
- Boss Coffee – wide variety of coffee beverages
- Fire
- Georgia – coffee-flavoured beverages sold by Coca-Cola
- Latte Latte
- Pokka Coffee – Milk coffee drinks from Pokka Sapporo
- Roots
- Wonda

=== Non-carbonated ===
- Amino-Value
- Bikkle - a popular yogurt-based drink
- C 1000 Lemon Water – A vitamin drink from the C 1000 pharmaceutical company, also in jelly form
- Calpis – a concentrated soft drink, also available in diluted and carbonated forms and in many flavours
- Hot Lemon – a hot winter drink usually served out of vending machines and convenience stores
- Jūrokucha – blend of 16 teas, available decaffeinated
- Lemongina – a sour lemon variant on the popular French soda Orangina
- Momo no Ten-nen sui
- Natchan! – an orange-flavored juice drink from Suntory
- Nectar – a peach flavored juicy drink from Fujiya
- Oi Ocha – a tea drink from Ito En
- Qoo – fruity soft drink in a variety of flavours from Coca-Cola
- Salt & Fruit – a fruity soft drink with lychee and berry flavors
- Vita 500

=== Sports drink ===
- Aquarius – grapefruit-flavoured sports drink
- Dakara
- Lipovitan – energy drink first released in the 1960s
- Pocari Sweat – soft drink produced by Otsuka Pharmaceutical Company

== Jordan ==
- Matrix Carbonated Drink
- Super

== Kosovo ==
Golden Eagle – an energy drink

== Kuwait ==
- Arabian Beverage Company – ABC – Nutritional range of beverages
- Kuwola, by Kuwait beverages limited

== Lebanon ==
- Bonjus – line of beverages produced in Lebanon by a company of the same name. The company was founded in 1962,
- Fridge – a brand name of a carbonated juice manufactured by Drinko s.a.r.l.
- Jalloul – old brand of soft drink
- Kazouza 1941 – Kazouza 1941 is the nostalgic, yet renewed, Lebanese product/brand with varied and innovative flavors and a unique bottle shape differentiating it from available products in the market.
- Najem – old brand of Lebanese soft drink and producer of Kazouza 1941
- Freez Mix – a line of fruit flavored soft drinks produced by Chateau Ka
- X-tra - a line of 25% to 35% juice drinks produced by Interbrand SAL founded by the late Andre Tabourian back in the 1960’s

== Libya ==
- Judi – Fruit Juices
- Zain – Ghuneim Juice Production - Benghazi
- Tibesti Cola - Named after The Tibesti Mountains, filled in 150ml cans. Available in multiple flavours
- Al Naseem - Fruit Juices

== Lithuania ==
- Gira – a traditional Slavic, Baltic and Germanic beverage, made from fermented rye bread – crusts or malted rye extract, yeast and sugar
- Selita – various carbonated and still soft drinks – also with juices maker and brand

=== Discontinued Soviet-era drinks – circa 1980–1990 ===
- Apelsinas
- Bachmaro
- Baikalas
- Buratinas
- Diušes – a pear flavour soft drink
- Fiesta – a lemon flavour tonic water
- Mandarinas
- Sajanai
- Svaja – a carrot flavour original soft drink with sediments
- Šaltukas
- Tarchunas
- Varpelis
- Vėsa – a strong specific flavour apple with mint drink

== Madagascar ==
- BonBon Anglais

== Malaysia ==
- 100plus – brand of isotonic energy drink by Fraser and Neave
- Fruit Tree by Fraser and Neave
- Ice Mountain by Fraser and Neave
- Seasons by Fraser and Neave
- Leema by Cinqasa
- Yeo's
  - Freedom Cola – cola in 2-varieties produced by Yeo's
  - H-Two-O – line of sports drinks sold by Yeo's
  - Justea – line of iced teas in 6-flavours produced by Yeo's
  - Soyrich – brand of soymilk available in 5-flavours produced by Yeo's

== Maldives ==
- Three Choice – formerly known as Don Don, sold in various flavours including cola flavour, apple, grape and cherry

== Malta ==
- Kinnie – bitter, amber-colored soda
- Krest – orange-flavoured soda produced by Coca-Cola

== Mauritius ==
- Cidona – apple-flavoured soft drink
- Eski

== Mexico ==
- Ameyal – brand of fruit sodas available in 8 flavours
- BEAT – citrus-flavoured soda from Coca-Cola
- Chaparritas – variously flavoured soft drinks in small bottles
- Ciel – bottled water distributed by Coca-Cola, also available in Angola and Morocco
- Coyame – sparkling mineral water, certificate from UNAM, born in the mineral springs from Catemaco, Veracruz
- Escuis – many varieties of fruit-flavoured soft drinks, founded in 1912
- Jarritos – lightly carbonated brand of soft drinks, available in twelve flavours
- Joya – brand of fruit sodas available in eight flavours from the Coca-Cola Company
- Lulu – carbonated soft drinks, available in various flavors
- Manzana Lift – line of apple-flavoured sodas available in five varieties from Coca-Cola
- Manzanita Deliciosa – flavoured apple soda, from Toluca México traditional with Mexican food, since 56 years ago
- Manzanita Sol – apple-flavoured beverages distributed by PepsiCo
- Pascual Boing – large line of carbonated and non-carbonated soft drinks in many flavours
- Peñafiel – mineral water available in three varieties from Cadbury-Schweppes
- Sangria Señorial – sangria-flavoured, non-alcoholic beverage
- Sangria Topochico – sangria
- Sidral Mundet – apple soft drink
- Toni Col – vanilla flavoured soft drink
- Topo chico – mineral water bottled in Monterrey
- Whopperán – gooseberry flavoured soft drink
- Yoli – lime flavoured, from the state of Guerrero
- Zaraza – commercially available as recently as 1986 in Veracruz

== Morocco ==
- Cool – range of soft drinks made from concentrated fruit juices
- Hawai – carbonated soft drink, available in pineapple and tropical flavours.
- Poms – apple flavoured carbonated soft drink
- Top's – soft drink in various flavours
- Vimto
- Seven up (Original-Mojito)
- Evervess
- Orangina
- Rani
- Royal Club
- Star Soda (mainly commercialised in Tangier and Tetouan)

== Myanmar ==
- Minute Maid Nutriboost
- Blue Mountain
- Star Cola
- Max Plus
- Max
- Ve Ve
- Rocker
- Hikari

== Netherlands ==
- AA Drink
- Royal Club
- G-Spot Energy Drink
- Dr. Foots
- 3ES
- Sisi

== New Zealand ==
- Foxton Fizz – soda, available in many flavours
- Fresh Up - made by Frucor-Suntory Beverages
- Höpt – carbonated, non-alcoholic hop-based soda with additional flavours
- Lemon & Paeroa
- Lemon & Te Aroha
- Petes Lemonade – local brand, founded in Nelson, 8 flavours
- Wests – local brand similar to Schweppes found mainly in the South Island, includes a wide range of sugar free, is New Zealand's oldest continuous manufacturer of soft drinks
- Chi - carbonated herbal soft drink
- Endeavour Mixers
- Illicit cola

== Norway ==
- Julebrus – Type of soda sold around Christmas, many varieties and brands
- Eventyrbrus – carbonated red-coloured drink
- Farris – mineral water, bottled since 1907
- Sunniva isTe Iced Tea
- Eldorado Iste
- Ingefærøl – ginger ale
- Isklar – pure glacier mineral water, still and sparkling
- Mozell – apple and grape flavoured soda
- Solo – orange flavoured, also other varieties, lemon, guava
- Tab X-Tra – Sugar free cola drink
- Urge – Predecessor and Norwegian version of the Surge soda from Coca-Cola
- Urge Intense – Energy drink sold under the Urge brand
- Villa – mixed fruits, formerly known as Villa Farris
- Voss – mineral water, still and carbonated
- Vørterøl - carbonated maltbeverage
- Oskar Sylte Mineral waters with pineapple taste

== Oman ==
- Al Khaleej – produced by Dhofar Beverages
- Quwat Jabal – lemon-lime soda from Coca-Cola
- Shark Energy

== Pakistan ==
Sting Energy Drink's Hummer traveling down the streets of Karachi, Pakistan

- Best
- Candia – Haleeb
- FRESHER Fresh juices, Pomegranate, Guava, peach, strawberry– www.al-hilal.com.pk/
- Fruit-a-Vitals – Nestle
- Gold Sip Nectar Juices by – Azam Food
- Gourmet Cola – cola
- Kooler Apple, Grape, Lime, Malt, Cocktail, Saudi Champagne – www.al-hilal.com.pk/
- Makkah Cola
- Malt – orange, lemon, peach
- Murree Brewery – apple, lemonade
- Nooras
- Pakola – line of fruit-flavoured sodas from Mehran Bottlers Ltd and Gul Bottlers – Pvt Ltd.
- Power – Energy drink
- Rooh Afza – popular juice produced by Hamdard Laboratories
- Shezan International – Fruit Juices
- Shakarganj Food Products Ltd – Any Time Juices in mango, orange, peach and apple flavors
- Shandy Cola
- Mashmoom - Food & Beverages (Juices, Water, Ketchup, Jams stc)
- Xtreme
- Cola Next - flavours; Cola Next, Dare Next, Rango Next, Fizzup Next, Anaar Next, Green Soda Next, Lychee Next and Storm

== Papua New Guinea ==
- GoGo Cola – produced by Pacific Industries in Rabaul..

== Paraguay ==
- Pulp
- Simba (soft drink)
- Terere
- Mate Cocido
- Cachaza
- Clerico
- Chicha
- Niko Soft Drink

== Peru ==
- Beed Cola – brand of soft drinks produced in Pucallpa
- Cassinelli – brand of soft drinks produced by Enrique Cassinelli and Sons
- Concordia – brand of soda available in many fruit flavours, produced by PepsiCo
- Energina- yellow soft drink produced by Socosani
- Fuji-Cola – created to support Alberto Fujimori's bid for President of Peru
- Guaraná (Backus) – soft drink produced by Backus and Johnston
- Inca Kola – yellow soda that tastes like bubble gum produced by Corporación José R. Lindley S.A.
- Isaac Kola – yellow soft drink created by Embotelladora Don Jorge S.A.C. to compete with Inca Kola and Oro
- Kola Escocesa – red soft drink available in several varieties
- Kola Inglesa – red, cherry-flavoured soda
- Kola Real – fruit-flavoured soda available in five flavours
- Oro – yellow soda produced by Ajegroup to compete with Inca Kola
- Perú Cola – brand of sodas in four flavours produced by Embotelladora Don Jorge S.A.C.
- Triple Kola – produced by PepsiCo and sold in Peru, it is similar to Inca Kola.
- Viva – similar to Inca Kola produced by Backus and Johnston

== Philippines ==
=== Carbonated soft drinks ===
- Jaz Cola – locally available cola from Coca-Cola, but discontinued since 2012.
- Lemo-Lime - now Royal Tru-Lemon since 2019
- Pop Cola – distributed by Coca-Cola, discontinued since 2021.
- Juicy Lemon – distributed by ARC Refreshments Corporation
- Fruit Soda Orange – distributed by ARC Refreshments Corporation
- Seetrus – distributed by ARC Refreshments Corporation
- Arcy's Root Beer – distributed by ARC Refreshments Corporation
- Royal Tru – introduced by San Miguel Brewery, now under Coca-Cola
- San Mig Cola - discontinued since 2021.
- Sarsi – a Sarsaparilla rootbeer originally made by Cosmos Bottling, now part of Coca-Cola, discontinued since 2024.
- Sparkle - a Lemon soft drink originally made by Cosmos Bottling, now part of Coca-Cola, replaced by Royal Tru-Lemon in 2019, Sprite Lemon+ in 2022, and Lift in 2025.
- Sunkist - distributed by Asia Brewery. carbonated variants with sugar are discontinued since 2023, while zero sugar variants are still available.
- Twist – lemon-lime soda, from the Zest-O Corporation
- Zest-O

=== Energy drinks ===
- Blue Men
- C4
- Cobra – produced by Asia Brewery
- Extra Joss – powdered energy drink from Kalbe, but now available in ready-to-drink bottles by ARC Refreshments.
- I-On by Revicon - discontinued since 2010s
- CULT
- Bacchus
- Black Mamba
- Lobo
- Predator - manufactured by the Coca-Cola Corporation. launched in 2024.
- Samurai - manufactured by the Coca-Cola Corporation but discontinued in 2010s
- Thunder Super Soda - manufactured by the Coca-Cola Corporation. launched in 2018, but discontinued since 2020.

=== Juice drinks ===
- BIG 250 – line of juices available in six flavours, from the Zest-O Corporation
- Drinky
- Eight O'Clock – powdered juice beverage, discontinued in 2022.
- Fres-C – powdered drink mix available in three flavours
- Funchum
- Jungle Juice
- Magnolia Fruit Drinks - Powdered variants manufactured by Ginebra San Miguel Inc., but discontinued since 2015, Bottled variants moved to San Miguel Brewery since 2015 and discontinued in 2025.
- Mix Frutz – by Innobev, Inc.
- OnePlus – line of iced teas available in nine flavours, from the Zest-O Corporation
- Orchard Fresh – line of bottled juices available in seven flavours, from the Zest-O Corporation
- Pek-Pek Juice
- Plus!
- Ponkana
- Refresh
- Sundays – made by snack foods giant Liwayway Marketing Corp.
- Sunglo – line of juices and powdered juices available in seven flavours, from the Zest-O Corporation
- Zest-O – popular line of juices available in twelve flavours, from the Zest-O Corporation

== Poland ==
=== Carbonated soft drinks ===
- 3 Cytryny, 3 Pomarańcze, 3 Witaminy... – by ZbyszkoCompany Sp. z o.o.
- Ariva Ice Tea – by ZbyszkoCompany Sp. z o.o.
- Black – by FoodCare.
- Chai Kola, Chai Mate – by Wild Grass
- Cola Original Zero – by Kantpol-Żywiecki Kryształ
- Freeway Cola Light – by Lidl
- Frugo – by FoodCare.
- Hallo Cola – by Wosana S.A. Butternut squash juice.
- Hoop Cola – by Hoop Company which also produce Original Cola for Biedronka supermarkets chain and Strong Cola for E.Leclerc hypermarket chain and also Hoop Citrus Ice, Hoop Czarna Porzeczka, Hoop Fruti, Hoop Limonka, Hoop Pomarańcza, Hoop Tonic, Hoop Podpiwek Staropolski, Hoop Kwas Chlebowy.
- Koral Ekipa – by Krynica Vitamin SA
- Lemo – by HOOP Polska
- Lemoniada – by Hellena
- Lemoniada – by Tymbark / Maspex Wadowice
- Matrix energy drink – by ZbyszkoCompany Sp. z o.o.
- Napoje gazowane: Limonka, Pomarańcza, Cytryna – by Hellena
- Next – by Tymbark
- Oranżada – by Hellena
- Polo-Cockta – by Zbyszko Company Sp. z o.o.
- Tęczowa Cola – by P.P.H FARPOL
- Tiger Energy Drink – by Maspex Wadowice
- Tonik – by Hellena
- Vega – by Tymbark
- Yerba Mate Rainbow – by Wild Grass

== Portugal ==
- Água Castello
- Atlântida – brand of flavoured water
- Besteiros - orange, lemon or pineapple flavored soft drink
- Brisa – brand of soft drinks marketed on Madeira Island
- Bussaco
- BriSol
- Frisumo
- Frutis
- IKA
- Kima – brand of soft drinks marketed in the Azores
- Laranjada – orange soda produced since 1872
- Snappy
- SUCOL – less sugar, more freshness
- Sumol + Compal

== Romania ==
- Adria - line of carbonated soft-drinks made by European Foods and Drinks
- Borsec – mineral water bottled by the Romaqua Group S.A.
- Boza
- Brifcor – carbonated, orange-flavoured beverage produced by the Romaqua Group S.A.
- Bucovina – mineral water
- Burn – international energy drink
- Cappy – natural fruit juice
- Carpatina – mineral water
- Compot
- Dorna – mineral water
- Frutti Fresh – line of fruit-flavoured sodas available in six flavours
- Giusto – line of sodas in nine flavours from the Romaqua Group S.A.
- Izvorul Alb
- Natura – line of juices in five flavours from the Romaqua Group S.A.
- Quick Cola – cola distributed by the Romaqua Group S.A.
- Socată
- Stânceni – seltzer mineral water produced by the Romaqua Group S.A.

== Russia ==
- Baikal – drink with siberian herbs extracts
- Buratino – caramel flavored soda, produced by various mainly local brands
- Duchess – pear-flavoured soda
- Elbrus – Natural mineral waters and soft drinks
- Kvass – traditional Slavic beverage made from fermented bread. Brands:
  - NiCola
  - Ochakovskiy
  - Russkiy dar
  - Khlebnyy kray
  - Kruzhka i bochka
- Marengo – drinks brand
- Napitki iz CernoGolovki - carbonated drinks brand. They reproduced most of soviet lemonades like, Buratino, Sayany, Baikal, Dyushes (pear), Tarhun (Tarragon) and others.

== Saint Kitts and Nevis ==
- Ice Cream Soda Butterscotch Soda Black Cherry Vanilla Soda Cranberry Clementine Soda Sarsaparilla Soda Cream Soda "big red..." Green Apple Soda Starfruit Soda False Beer (Really just root beer and cream soda...) (1978) Teas: Blueberry Tea Ginger Peach Tea

== Saudi Arabia ==
- Alsi Cola
- Arab Cola
- Code Red
- fifa
- Kinza – major beverage brand
- Leemo-1
- Milaf Cola
- Nerve
- Salaam Cola
- Stream

== Serbia ==
=== Carbonated ===
- Knjaz Miloš – brand of bottled water, fruit juices, soda, and an energy drink
- Vrnjci - brand of bottled water, fruit juices, soda, etc.
- Na eks
- Feshta
- Frutella
- Alpina

=== Non-carbonated ===
- Fruvita
- Next
- Nectar
- Swisslion

=== Energy Drinks ===
- Booster
- Guarana no sleep
- Doctor Night
- After Party
- Excess
- Fast Energy Drink

== Singapore ==
=== Carbonated ===
- 235 energy drink
- Anything
- F&N
- Joe Drink
- Naughty G series
- POP
- Oldenlandia Water

=== Non-carbonated ===
- Lemon and Kalamansi
- Pink Dolphin
- Seasons
- Whatever

=== Sports drink ===
- 100 Plus – lightly carbonated sports drinks from Fraser and Neave, Limited (F&N)
- Sportade
- H-Two-O (H_{2}O)

== Slovakia ==
- Kofola
- Vinea
- Rajec - mineral water with many flavored varieties

== Slovenia ==
- Cockta
- Jupi
- Donat Mg
- Ora
- Stil

== South Africa ==
- Appletiser – apple, pear, and grape-flavoured carbonated soft drinks
- Bashew's – carbonated soft drinks since 1899
- Iron Brew
- Jive – carbonated soft drinks
- King Cola – carbonated cola soft drink
- Kingsley – carbonated soft drinks since 2006
- King Malta – carbonated dark malt drink
- Schweppes Sparkling Granadilla Twist – carbonated soft drinks – passion fruit flavour
- Soda King – carbonated soft drinks
- Soraya Apple Malt – carbonated apple flavoured malt drink
- Sparletta Creme Soda – carbonated soft drinks – green in colour and a more 'floral' flavour than white cream soda
- Stoney Ginger Beer – carbonated soft drinks
- Twizza – carbonated soft drinks
- Twist – carbonated soft drinks
- Refreshhh! – carbonated soft drinks and energy drinks
- MOFAYA – carbonated energy drink

== South Korea ==
- Bacchus-F – non-carbonated energy drink by the Dong-A Corporation
- Cham Doo – cereal drink made from 15 grains produced by Lotte Chilsung
- Chilsung Cider – colorless, lemon-lime soda produced by Lotte Chilsung
- Coco – coconut-flavoured juice bottled by the OKF Corporation
- Da Jun Moon
- Dynamic – energy drink produced by Lotte Chilsung
- Ginseng Up – ginseng-infused health drink produced by Ilhwa Company Ltd.
- Hi-Sec – grape and orange juices with fruit pieces distributed by Ilhwa Company Ltd.
- Hong Gee Won – juice made from the Yong-Gee mushroom, produced by Ilhwa Company Ltd.
- Hyeonmi Cha – made from roasted brown rice and sweeteners
- ILAC – carbonated jelly drink and line of juices produced by Lotte Chilsung
- Mega Vita
- McCol – cola made from barley, produced by Ilhwa Company Ltd.
- Milkis – carbonated milk in five flavors produced by Lotte Chilsung, available internationally
- Misofiber – apple-flavoured fiber drink produced by Ilhwa Company Ltd.
- Natural Soda – mineral-rich soft drink produced by Ilhwa Company Ltd.
- Pine Bud – pine leaf extract beverage produced by Lotte Chilsung
- Richard's Cafe – pre-made coffee available in 6 flavours from the OKF Corporation
- Sac's – three flavours of fruit juices produced by the OKF Corporation
- Sikhe – traditional drink made from fermented rice produced by Lotte Chilsung
- Sparkling – flavoured water available in 8 flavours from the OKF Corporation
- Today's Tea – brand of teas in many flavours distributed by Lotte Chilsung
- Vita 500
- Vita Power – vitamin drink, available in two varieties, produced by Lotte Chilsung
- Volcano – energy drink produced by the OKF Corporation

== Spain ==
- Chupa Chups soft drinks
- Clipper – strawberry soda brand from Gran Canaria, that sells only in Canary islands. It actually has a Wikipedia page, but just in its Spanish version.
- Kas – fruit-flavoured, carbonated beverage brand, now owned by PepsiCo
- La Casera – brand of soda marketed by Orangina Schweppes
- Mare Rosso – bitter soft drink marketed by Coca-Cola
- Mirinda – brand of fruity sodas in nine flavours distributed by PepsiCo
- Trina – formerly "Trinaranjus", non-carbonated soft drinks distributed by Orangina
- Missile Energy drink
- Urban is a brand with several flavours of soft drinks (most notably cola) produced by the Firgas bottled water company, out of Gran Canaria, and sold mainly in Canary Islands.
- Duk is a soft drink from the island of La Palma, which has several flavor variants.

== Sri Lanka ==
- Baby Brand
- Elephant House Cream Soda
- Elephant House Lemonade
- Elephant House Necto
- Elephant House Orange Barley
- Elephant House Orange Crush
- Elephant House Soda
- Elephant House Tonic
- Elephant House Bitter Lemon
- Elephant House Apple Soda
- Elephant House Ginger Beer (EGB)
- Elephant House Dry Ginger Ale
- Elephant House KIK Cola
- Elephant House Twistee Apple
- Elephant House Twistee Peach
- My Cola
- My Orange
- My Lemon
- My Cream Soda
- Ole Arshik
- Ole Cream Soda
- Ole Ginger Beer
- Ole Zingo
- Shaa Cola
- Shaa Mandarin
- Shaa Orange
- Shaa Lemon

== Suriname ==
- Fernandes – soft drink

=== Mineral water ===
- Aqua Kristall
- Basic One – sourced in Zanderij, Suriname
- Diamond Blue-Made by Rudisa beverages
- Para springs – sourced in Amazon rainforest fresh water resources, Suriname

MORE juices-made by Rudisa Beverages Basic One bottled water Wahaha bottled water

== Sweden ==
- Alla tiders
- Apotekarnes Cola
- Bordsdricka – traditional soft drink, with a taste of portello and julmust
- Champis – began production under this name in 1918
- Citronil – traditional soft drink
- Cuba Cola – brand of cola marketed by Saturnus AB since 1953
- Dansk Citron – bright yellow lemon-flavoured soft drink
- Drink 21 – cola mixed with julmust
- Enbärsdricka – traditional, sweet soft drink
- Frank's Energy and Sports Drink – energy drink brewed by Kopparbergs
- Fruktsoda – lemon-lime soda
- Grappo – grape-fruit soda
- Green cow – energy drink which is an obvious parody of Red Bull. Created as an advertisement for Hammarby IF
- Guldus – apple soda
- Haiwa – pineapple soda
- Hallonsoda – raspberry soda
- Jaffa – soft drinks with a taste of orange
- Julmust – traditional Christmas-season drink
- Kitty Kola – cola-flavoured soft drink
- Loranga – orangeade
- M.A.C. Black Cola
- Merry – luxurious lemon/lime drink no longer in stock
- Nexcite – an energy drink meant to promote the female libido, from Nexcite AB
- Pommac – secret recipe including 25 varieties of fruit, oak barrel maturated, one of Sweden's oldest sparkling soft drinks
- Portello – red peculiar soft drink from northern Sweden, similar to but not identical with the British Portello soft drink
- Påskmust – more or less identical to Julmust but sold at Easter
- Päronsoda – pear soda
- Palestine Cola - cola - The drink is marketed as an alternative to brands like Coca-Cola and Pepsi for consumers who wish to boycott companies perceived as supporting Israel.
- Rio – Blood orange
- Siddni – soft drink with taste of passion fruit
- Sockerdricka – traditional sweet-sour soft drink
- Svagdricka – traditional stout-like soft drink similar to Kvass
- Syd – orangeade
- Trocadero – Soft drink with a taste of orange and apple juice
- Vira Blåtira – bright blue tutti frutti soda
- XL Cola – A cola-flavoured soft drink produced in Sweden.
- Zingo – Soft drinks with a taste of orange, pineapple/orange or melon/lemon.

=== Non-carbonated ===
- Festis
- MER
- Smil

=== Sports Drinks ===
- Pripps Energy
- White Tiger
- Nocco
- Celsius

== Switzerland ==
- Baerg Goggi - discontinued cola drink
- Elmer Citro - lemonade
- Flauder - carbonated mineral water with an elderflower and lemon balm flavor
- Gazosa
- Goba Cola
- Gretchen Cola
- Happy Cola - cola in various flavors from the Coop supermarket chain
- Kult Ice Tea – ice tea manufactured by Migros
- M-Budget – low price drink line by Migros including Citron, Orange, Grapefruit and Cola. Every flavour includes a "zero" variant
- Mojo - sparkling fruit drink in different flavors
- Nycha Kombucha - drink with fermented green tea
- Passaia – passion fruit soda from Rivella SA
- Pepita – carbonated grapefruit lemonade, also available with orange, or lemon flavours.
- Ramseier - apple juice and apple cider drinks
- Rivella – milk plasma-based soft drink available in five variants (classic, green tea, sugarfree, peach, rhubarb) from Rivella SA
- Vivi Kola - cola drink produced since 1938
- Nestea

== Taiwan ==
=== Carbonated drinks ===
- Apple Sidra
- HeySong Sarsaparilla
- Vitaly

=== Non-carbonated drinks ===
- Cha Li Wang – various flavours of sweetened and unsweetened tea

=== Sports drinks ===
- Super Supau

== Thailand ==
- Est Cola
- Green Spot – non-carbonated orange soft drink

=== Energy Drinks ===
- Carabao Daeng
- Krating Daeng
- M-150
- Shark – energy drink

== Togo ==
- Cocktail de Fruit
- Singha

== Trinidad and Tobago ==
- Angostura LLB (Lemon Lime and Bitters)
- Busta
- Cannings – former brand of soft drinks owned by Coca-Cola, available in many fruit flavours - now branded as Fanta
- Chubby
- Cole Cold
- Cydrax
- Ginseng UP
- Mauby Fizz – cola produced from mauby bark
- Peardrax
- Shandy Carib (different flavors)
- Solo Apple J
- Solo Bentley
- Solo Ginger Beer
- Solo Juices (different flavors)
- Solo Orange J
- Solo Pear J
- Solo Soft Drinks (different flavors, such as banana, kola champagne, and cream soda)
- Solo Sorrel
- Sorell Fizz
- Upper 10
- Viva

== Tunisia ==
- Boga – introduced in 1947, with 4 different flavors
- Cider Meddeb
- Fayrouz
- Danao
- Delice – brand of Danon company
- Oh!
- Pétillante Sabrine (exist in 5 different flavors)
- Freez
- Délio
- Viva
- Raouaa
- Diva
- Florida
- Fourat

== Turkey ==
- 7 Gün
- Cola Turka – brand of cola, advertised by Chevy Chase
- Çamlıca – carbonated drinks brand
- Elvan
- Şalgam – fermented carrot beverage
- Şıra – slightly fermented grape juice
- Uludağ Gazoz – gazoz-flavoured soda
- Niğde Gazozu – raspberry-flavoured soda

== Ukraine ==
- Revo – carbonated drinks brand

== United Arab Emirates ==
- Alokozay
- Dubai Cola – cola flavored with dates
- Green Cola – Stevia sweetened soft drinks with cola, cherry, lemonade and orange flavors
- O – locally manufactured as a low cost alternative to Pepsi and Coca-Cola, comes in cola, berries, lemon and orange flavors
- Power Plus – brand of energy drinks available in five flavours from ZamZam Refreshment
- Shani – owned by PepsiCo
- Star – a local soft drink brand that comes in many flavors
- Zamzam – brand of sodas and bottle water from Zamzam Refreshment
- XTRA POWER Energy drink – Manufacturing by Universal Beverages Factory LLC

== United Kingdom ==
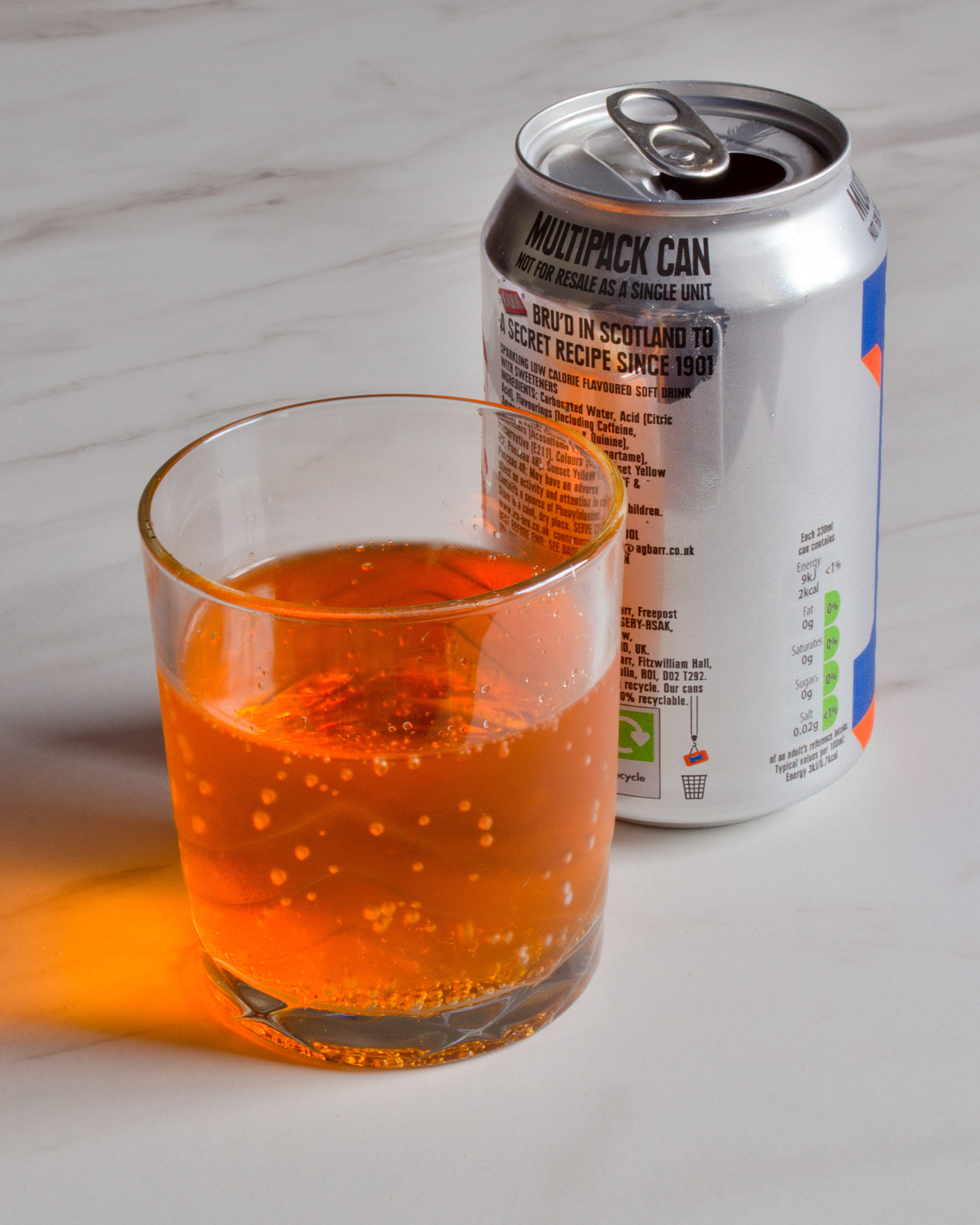
Irn-Bru Sugar Free

- Amé
- Barr – brand of Scottish company A.G. Barr – range of drinks includes American Cream Soda, Cola, Red Kola, Ginger Beer, Lemonade, Pineapple, Limeade and Orangeade and of course the world-famous Irn-Bru
- Barley water – popular drink made from boiling barley
- Bing – a dark orange soft drink produced by the Silver Spring Mineral Water Company
- Bitter Shandy
- Black Sun Energy drink
- Boost – energy drink
- Bouvrage – a juice soft drink, made with raspberries or blueberries
- Cocofina – a natural coconut water and three flavoured coconut waters mixed with juices
- Classic Cola – brand of cola
- Corona – discontinued soft drink brand
- Cresta – discontinued fruit-flavoured "frothy" soft drinks manufactured by Schweppes
- Dandelion and burdock – traditional soft drink made from fermented dandelion and burdock
- Emerge – energy drink manufactured by Cott
- Energizer Brands – energy drink manufacturer
- Evoca Cola – soda made with black seed extract
- Evoid Drinks – brand of fruit juices with no added sugars, preservatives, or other additives
- Explosade – carbonated soft drink
- Feel Good Drinks Co – brand of juices, now sold in 14 countries
- Fentiman's Botanically Brewed Beverages – including traditional ginger beer; Victorian lemonade; curiosity cola; dandelion & burdock; brewed shandy; mandarin & seville orange jigger tonic water & rose lemonade
- Firefly Tonics – line of fruit juices with herbal extracts
- Folkington's – premium fruit juices, sparkling presses and mixers
- Fruit Shoot – brand of juice drinks from Britvic available in 5 flavours
- Gaza Cola – BDS alternative soft drink from Palestine House with 100% of profits going to rebuild hospitals in Gaza
- Ginger beer – originated in the 18th century
- Innocent Smoothies – 100% fruit smoothies and fruit juices
- Irn-Bru – orange-coloured citrus soft drink from Scotland and very popular there; produced by A.G. Barr
- J_{2}O – soft drink made from fruit juices, produced by Britvic
- KA
- Kia-Ora – line of fruit juices available in 4 flavours
- Levi Roots Drinks - exotic fruity soft drinks in a range of flavours
- Lilt – fruity soda available in three flavours
- Lucozade – energy drinks of several varieties, a former GlaxoSmithKline brand, now produced by Suntory
- Lurvills Delight – discontinued soda
- Luscombe Organic Drinks – hand crafted organic adult soft drinks including Hot Ginger Beer, Elderflower Bubbly, Sicilian Lemonade, Raspberry Crush, Apple & Ginger, Orange Juice, St Clements, Apple & Pear Juice, Devon Apple Juice.
- Maine – line of sodas, cordials, and seltzers from Maine Soft Drinks Ltd.
- Panda Pops – soft fizzy drinks in a range of flavours.
- Prime Hydration - fruity energy drink created by KSI and Logan Paul, available in various flavours.
- Purdey's – botanical energy and vitamin drink in three variants made by Orchid Drinks Ltd (owned by Britvic).
- Qibla Cola – cola from the Qibla Cola Company
- Quatro – soda from Coca-Cola
- R. White's Lemonade – carbonated lemonade distributed by Britvic
- Red Kola – fruity soft drink from A.G. Barr plc
- Red Rooster – mixed fruit-flavoured energy drink produced by the Cott company
- Relentless – particularly sweet energy drink from Coca-Cola
- Ribena – brand of fruity soft drinks available in many flavours from GlaxoSmithKline, now produced by Suntory
- Robinsons – brand of soft drinks available in many flavours of cordial and flavoured water from Britvic.
- Rola Cola – cola distributed worldwide by Dubuis & Rowsell
- Rubicon, exotic fruit drinks produced by subsidiary of A.G. Barr
- Rubicon Raw Energy - fruity energy drink version of Rubicon
- Schweppes
- Shloer
- Stratford Sodas – brand of soft drink made specifically for mixing with rums.
- Tango – originally an orange flavour soft drink, now a range of drinks including Tango Orange and Tango Apple, produced by Britvic
- Tizer, produced by A.G. Barr
- Tonic water – Carbonated water flavoured with quinine
- Twiss
- Vimto and Vimto Cherry
- Virgin Cola – discontinued Cola brand
- Viva Drinks – A range of functional drinks made with a blend of fruit juices, water & botanicals
- Dr Pepper- popular soft drink in the UK.

=== Mineral water ===
- Buxton Mineral Water – sourced in Buxton, England
- Harrogate Spa Water – sourced in Harrogate, England
- Highland Spring – produced in Blackford, Perth and Kinross, Scotland
- Malvern Water – sourced in Colwall in the Malvern Hills, England
- Strathmore Water – sourced in Strathmore, Scotland and bottled in Forfar by A.G. Barr
- Willow Water – sourced in the Lake District

== United States ==
- 7 Up – licensed by Dr Pepper/Seven Up to local bottlers
- Ale-8-One – a ginger-and-fruit drink distributed mostly in Kentucky
- Amp Energy – an energy drink from PepsiCo
- Aquafina – bottled water distributed by PepsiCo
- Arizona – mostly iced teas, marketed in distinctive tall, 23-oz. cans
- A-Treat
- A&W Root Beer and A&W cream soda – licensed by Dr Pepper/Seven Up to local bottlers
- Bawls
- Barton Springs Soda Co
- Barq's – the only major American root beer with caffeine.
- Big Ben's - Catawissa Bottling Company - line of soft drinks. Known for their Blue Birch Beer. Sold in Northeastern Pennsylvania.
- Big Red
- Blenheim Ginger Ale – a particularly strong ginger ale, bottled by Blenheim Bottlers
- Boylan Bottling Company – a variety of sodas such as Birch beer and Root beer.
- Bubble Up – lemon-lime soda, similar to 7 up, produced by Monarch Beverage Company
- Buffalo Rock Ginger Ale – a dark-colored ginger ale produced by Buffalo Rock Company – mainly distributed in the southeastern states
- Burn Energy Drink, owned by Monster beverage corporation
- Bruce Cost Ginger Ale – line of ginger ales produced by BCGA Concept Corp with fresh ginger instead of extracts or other flavorings
- C & C Cola – a cola brand distributed as a regular grocery item rather than stocked by the bottling company's local drivers
- Cactus Cooler – licensed by Dr Pepper/Seven Up to local bottlers
- Cheerwine – cherry flavored drink – mainly North Carolina and Virginia
- Chicago Root Beer – line of root beer associated under the Cool Mountain Beverages brand
- Chucker – discontinued line of flavored soda formerly made in Connellsville, Pennsylvania
- Coca-Cola – cola - licensed by the Coca-Cola Company
- Coco Rico – coconut-flavored soft drink
- Cool Mountain Beverages
- Country Time – licensed by Dr Pepper/Seven Up to local bottlers
- Crush – Dr Pepper/Seven Up
- Dad's Root Beer – Monarch Beverage Company, Atlanta, GA
- Delaware Punch – grape-flavored, non-carbonated, limited availability
- Diet Rite – diet cola licensed by Dr Pepper/Seven Up R.C. unit to local bottlers
- dnL – caffeinated lemon-lime soda similar to Mountain Dew, from Dr Pepper/Seven Up
- Double Cola – regional cola brand based in Chattanooga, Tennessee
- Dr. Brown's – A popular brand of root beer and cream soda in the New York City region
- Dr Enuf – vitamin-fortified lemon-lime drink available in northeast Tennessee, parts of Florida, and possibly elsewhere
- Dr Pepper – large international beverage company, founded in 1885
- Egg cream – type of fountain drink that originated in Brooklyn
- Faygo – line of soft drinks
- Fitz's – root beer and other classic sodas bottled in a microbrewery/restaurant in St. Louis, MO, distributed to certain grocery stores around the country
- Foxon Park – Connecticut based soda company distributing real cane sugar sodas throughout the U.S. Favorites include Birch Beer, Root Beer and many others
- Fresca – grapefruit soda marketed by the Coca-Cola Company
- Frostie – root beer, cream, and fruit-flavored sodas
- Frostop – root beer and cream soda
- Grapico – Grape soft drink primarily available in Alabama
- Green River – lime-flavored soft drink
- Hansen's – soft drinks, natural juices, energy drinks
- Hawaiian Punch – licensed by Dr Pepper/Seven Up to local bottlers
- Hires Root Beer – licensed by Dr Pepper/Seven Up to local bottlers
- Hyvee – only marketed in the midwest
- IBC Root Beer – 11 flavors, owned by Dr Pepper/Seven Up/Snapple group
- Iron Beer – Formerly the National Beverage of Cuba, this beverage is consumed mainly by Cubans in Florida, and has been around since 1917. A rare product to find, No longer produced in Cuba, only found in Florida.
- Izze – natural flavored fruit drinks, multiple flavors
- Jolly Good – numerous flavors including cola, lemon lime, orange, grape, pina colada, black cherry etc.
- Jolt Cola – made with double caffeine, hence the "jolt" name
- Jones Soda – made with pure cane sugar and known for odd flavors including "candy corn" for Halloween and "turkey and dressing" for Thanksgiving
- Josta first US energy drink, aka Josta with Guarana
- Kickapoo Joy Juice, also known simply as Kickapoo, a carbonated citrus drink
- Kist – orange soda, later other flavors
- Kola Champagne – despite a name that suggests an alcoholic drink, Kola Champagne is actually a soft drink
- Limonada Santurce Soda Water – lemon-lime soda
- Loganberry – dark purple, non-carbonated, berry-flavored drink with no juice content most commonly available under the Crystal Beach and Aunt Rosie's brand names; available in and around Buffalo, NY
- Malta India – malt beverage
- Manhattan Special – espresso soda
- Marengo – Iced Coffee Drinks
- Mary Jane's Relaxing Soda
- Minute Maid – soft drink only – licensed by The Coca-Cola Company
- Mello Yello – lemon-lime, similar to Mountain Dew – The Coca-Cola Company
- Mountain Dew – licensed by PepsiCo
- Moxie – the first American mass-produced soft drink, primarily available in New England and Pennsylvania
- Mug Root Beer – licensed by PepsiCo
- Nehi – Dr Pepper/Seven Up
- Nesbitt's – Retro Orange Soda
- Northern Neck Ginger Ale – Central/Eastern Virginia
- OK Soda – a discontinued test drink from The Coca-Cola Company
- Old Colony – grape and pineapple varieties
- Olipop
- Original New York Seltzer - variety of flavors produced from 1981 until 1994, then revived in 2015.
- Pepsi – cola - licensed by PepsiCo
- Pibb Xtra – formerly known as Mr. Pibb – Coca-Cola Company
- Polar – Line of soft-drinks primarily sold in New England
- R.C. Cola – Cola – licensed by Dr Pepper/Seven Up to local bottlers
- Red Rock Cola
- RESQ – energy drink
- Refresco Goya – Goya Foods line of soft drinks for the US Hispanic market
- Route 66 Sodas, LLC – produces a variety including Route 66 Route Beer, Orange, Lime and Cream Soda.
- Rock Creek Soda – owned by Canada Dry Potomac Corporation.
- R.W. Knudsen Family
- Safeway Select – Safeway brand drink
- Sam's Choice – Walmart brand drink
- Sarsaparilla soda – Traditional soft drink
- Schweppes Ginger Ale – licensed by Dr Pepper/Seven Up to local bottlers
- Shasta – Cola plus dozens of other flavors
- Sierra Mist – lemon-lime, similar to 7 up and Sprite – PepsiCo (discontinued in 2023)
- Slice – orange soft drink – PepsiCo
- Sprecher Brewery – traditional beverages
- Squirt – licensed by Dr Pepper/Seven Up to local bottlers
- Starry – lemon-lime, similar to 7 up and Sprite – PepsiCo
- Stewart's Fountain Classics
- Steaz
- Sun Drop – licensed by Dr Pepper/Seven Up to local bottlers
- Sunkist – licensed by Dr Pepper/Seven Up to local bottlers
- Sunny Select – sold at Save Mart Supermarkets/Lucky – No. Cal/Food Maxx/Food Source
- SunnyD – licensed by Dr Pepper/Seven Up to local bottlers
- Surge – a citrus soda brought back after being discontinued – Coca-Cola Company
- Tab – licensed by The Coca-Cola Company
- Towne Club – Detroit-based line of inexpensive soft drinks
- treetop
- Vault – licensed by The Coca-Cola Company
- Vess – a line of soft drinks primarily available in the Greater St. Louis area
- Vernors Ginger Ale – the first American soft drink, licensed by Dr Pepper/Seven Up to local bottlers, primarily available in Michigan
- Welch's – licensed by Dr Pepper/Seven Up to local bottlers
- White Rock – traditional beverages
- WPOP – Wegmans Brand90 traditional beverages

== Uruguay ==
- Paso de los Toros – brand of tonic water and fruit-flavoured soft drinks from PepsiCo

== Vanuatu ==
- Lava Cola – soft drink containing kava extracts, marketed for its relaxing properties and described as an "anti-energy drink"

== Venezuela ==
- Frescolita – cream soda-type drink
- Hit – carbonated soft drink available in 6 fruit flavours
- Papelón con limón – traditional drink made from papelón, water, and lemon or lime juice
- Glup - Caffeinated beverage with sugar, and flavors

== Vietnam ==
- Xá xị Chương Dương - sarsaparilla flavored soda
- Soda kem - cream soda drinks sold under several brands such as Mirinda
- Sting – energy drink
- Number One Cola

== Yemen ==
- Shani - berry flavored soft drink

== Zimbabwe ==
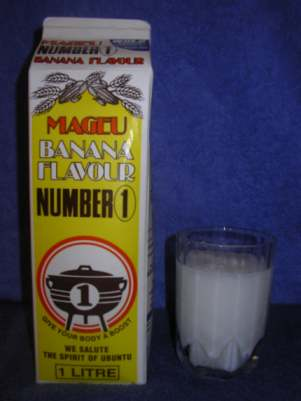
Mageu

- Blue mountain juices – natural juices made in the Eastern Highlands of Zimbabwe available in orange, passion fruit and mango
- Fizzi - A line of carbonated soft drinks produced by Probottlers, offering nine refreshing flavors.
- Carimba – carbonated soft drink available in three fruit flavours
- Cascade – fruit drinks made by Lyons a subsidiary of Dairibord Holdings Limited
- Chibuku – traditional sorghum beer
- Mahewu/Mageu – a very popular traditional sorghum malt drink made by Makonde industries
- Mazoe – concentrated juice from the Mazowe Citrus available in orange raspberry and cream soda – green
- Quench – fruit juice made by Dairibord holdings

== See also ==
- Craft soda
- List of citrus soft drinks
- List of lemon-lime soda brands
- List of national drinks
- List of soft drink producers
