= Brand 5 =

Carbonated flavoured soft drink from Gibraltar

- Type: Carbonated soft drink
- Manufacturer: Charles Gaggero Ltd
- Country of origin: Gibraltar
- Introduced: 1835; 190 years ago
- Discontinued: 2019

Brand 5 was a range of carbonated flavoured soft drinks that were produced and distributed in Gibraltar by Charles Gaggero Ltd (franchised bottler of The Coca-Cola Company in Gibraltar) until 2019.

== History ==
In the 1970s, the brand's glass bottles were replaced by plastic bottles.

In 2019, Charles Gaggero Ltd announced it would cease its production and commercialisation of Brand 5 within the year citing the international competition as the main reason for shutting down the operations.

== Description ==
The soda's factory was located on George's Lane.
