= Bonjus =

- Industry: Food
- Headquarters: Lebanon
- Products: Juice; ice cream; dairy products

Bonjus (Arabic: بون جوس, from French: good juice) is a Lebanese brand of juice, ice cream and dairy products, famous for its "Pyramid-shaped" (الهرم) juicebox (actually tetrahedral). Much beloved among the Lebanese, the juice has become a national icon and source of much nostalgia and sentimentality in the country. Known for it distinct pyramid shaped box, Bonjus has been an accessible product at the price of 250 Liras for more than 40 years. A traditional Lebanese breakfast consists of an iconic pyramid box of Bonjus and a mankoushe. Bonjus products are distributed within Lebanon, the Gulf region and in Africa. It's also widely known in Syria.

Another competitor of the pyramid in Lebanon is Top Juice, produced by the Lebanese LibanJus.

== History ==
In the 1960s, it was founded as a juice production company, located in Fanar.

In the late 60's, ice cream was introduced, and dairy in the 70's.

In 2016, the "Bonjus Dairy" product line has been given a new brand identity, product taste, and packaging.
