= Slow Cow =

Relaxation drink made in Canada

- Type: Relaxation drink
- Manufacturer: Slow Cow Drink Inc.
- Origin: Canada
- Introduced: December 2008
- Website: slowcow.com

Slow Cow is a relaxation drink, dubbed an "anti-energy" drink, produced in Quebec, Canada, by the company Slow Cow Drink Inc. It was created to "help people slow down" and parodied Red Bull by using packaging similar to that of the popular energy drink. Slow Cow was launched in Quebec in December 2008, with plans to sell the product in the rest of Canada, and in France, the United Arab Emirates, Lebanon, the United States, Russia, Hong Kong, Italy, Iceland, China and the Czech Republic.

== History ==
Slow Cow was developed by Lino Fleury in Quebec. He noted that while there were plenty of energy drinks available, there were no beverages to "help people slow down when they are stressed". Because of the caffeine present in energy drinks, he said that they were inclined to "increase anxiety, not reduce it". Fleury and his team began developing the relaxation drink in 2006 using mostly natural ingredients that would calm the drinker without inducing drowsiness.

The original Slow Cow logo, which prompted legal action by Red Bull

When the finished product was launched in December 2008, it was packaged to parody Red Bull. The can was of a similar shape and size as the popular energy drink, and the logo featured two cows relaxing to contrast the two bulls fighting in the Red Bull logo. After the launch, Red Bull GmbH sent Slow Cow Drink Inc. a formal notice to close, claiming that Slow Cow's packaging copied Red Bull's. While Fleury admitted to the similar packaging, he said that his lawyers "are confident they will win this case".
