= Fuji-Cola =

Variant of the soft drink cola from Peru

- Type: Soft drink
- Introduced: 2006; 19 years ago
- Flavour: Cola

Fuji-Cola is a soft drink created to promote Alberto Fujimori, a former President of Peru. The drink was created by his supporters to promote and fund his campaign for the vote in 2006. Kenji Fujimori, Alberto's son, has applied for a trademark on the name.
