= Pony Malta =

Non-alcoholic malt beverage

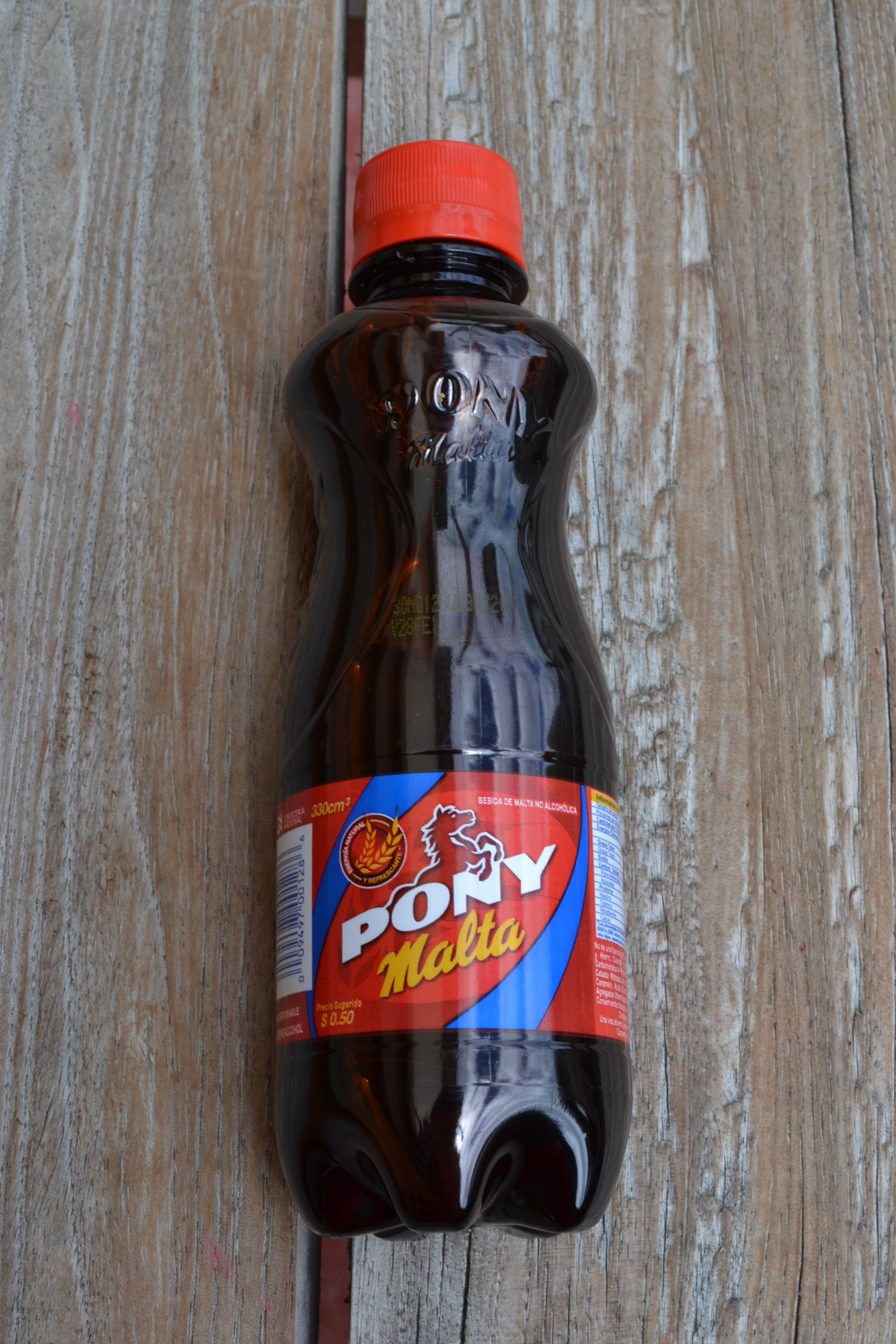
Bottle of Pony Malta

Pony Malta is a malt-based non-alcoholic beverage produced in Colombia by Cervecería Bavaria since 1956. Currently, the beverage is distributed in Chile, Mexico, Spain, and Ecuador. It is the best-selling malt beverage in both Peru and Colombia.

== History ==
In 1953, Cervecería Bavaria created Pony Malta. Their goal was to create both a nutritious and high-energy drink. In their advertising, the company has tried to associate the beverage with sports and an active lifestyle.
