= Star Cola =

Soft drink brand

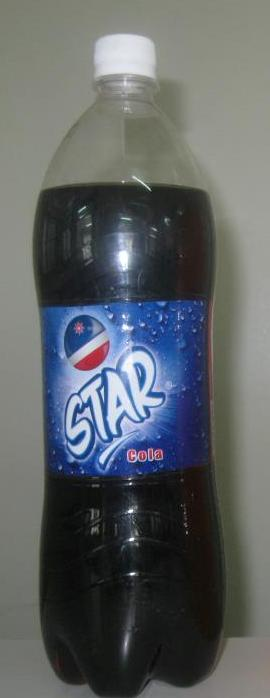
- Type: Soft-drink
- Manufacturer: Lotte-MGS Beverage (formerly MGS Beverages Co., ltd)
- Origin: Myanmar
- Introduced: 1998
- Variants: cola, power plus(energy drink)
- Related products: Coca-Cola, Pepsi

Star Cola (Burmese: စတားကိုလာ) is a cola drink produced in Myanmar. Star Cola is manufactured and distributed by MGS Beverages Co., Ltd., which is under the MGS (Myanma Golden Star) Group of Companies.

After MGS Beverages Co., Ltd. was joint ventured with Lotte Chilsung in 2014 and formed Lotte-MGS Beverage, it continued to manufacture Star Cola alongside Pepsi Cola Products in Myanmar.
MGS Beverages markets Star Cola in 250 mL & 285 mL glass bottles and 380 mL, 600 mL and 1.25 L PET bottles.

== Slogans ==
"Taste of the New Generation"
