= Matrix Carbonated Drink =

Soft carbonated drink

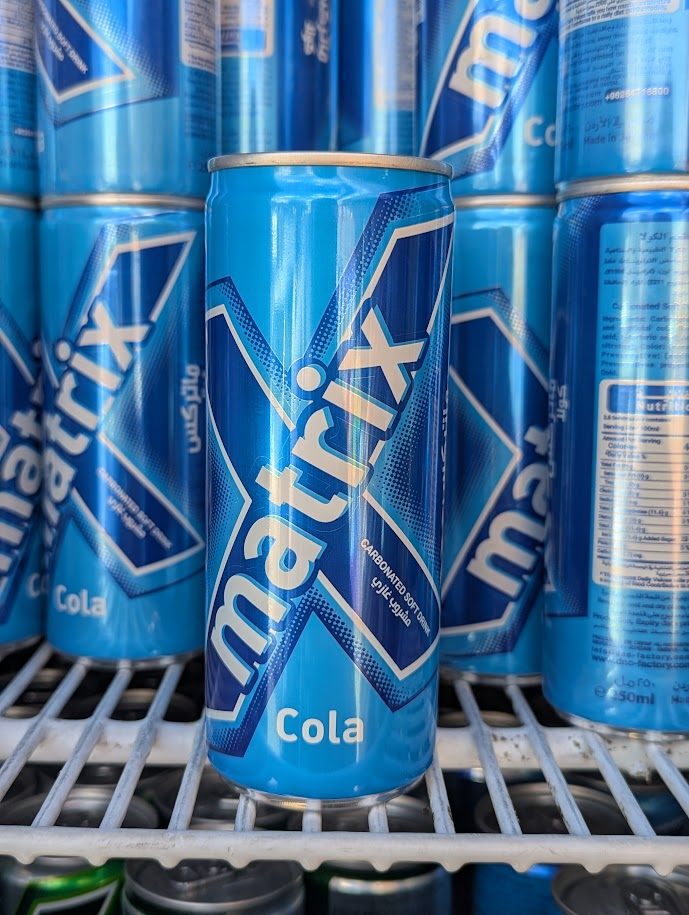
- A can of Matrix as sold in Jordan
- Type: Soft drink
- Manufacturer: Defaf Al-Nahrayn Company
- Distributor: Defaf Al-Nahrayn Company
- Origin: Jordan
- Website: https://dnc-factory.com/about-defaf-al-nahrayn-company-dnc/

Matrix Carbonated Drink is a carbonated soft drink produced in Jordan by Defaf Al-Nahrayn Company, a Jordanian beverage and snacks company established in 2008. Matrix was introduced to the Jordanian market as part of the company's efforts to provide a domestic alternative to western cola brands.

== History and context ==
The Defaf AL-Nahrayn Company (DNC) was established in 2008 in Jordan as a beverage and snack company. Following the outbreak of the Gaza genocide in 2023, consumer boycott campaigns associated with the Boycott, Divestment, and Sanctions (BDS) movement gained increased visibility in Jordan. During this period, locally produced food and beverage brands, including domestic soft drink alternatives, received greater attention from consumers seeking substitutes for international products.

According to a study conducted by the Centre for Strategic Studies at the University of Jordan, 93-95% of Jordanians reported adhering to boycotts of Israeli, American, and other products linked to countries perceived as supporting Israel during the Gaza genocide. The study found that most respondents had shifted toward locally produced alternatives, while 72% believed the boycotts did not negatively affect the Jordanian national economy.

== Marketing Strategy ==
Matrix's marketing strategy in Jordan focused on entering the market during a period of increased consumer demand for local alternatives to western soft drink brands such as Pepsi and Coca-Cola. The company positioned its product as a locally produced cola that offered comparable quality at a competitive price.

The Matrix carbonated drink range includes several flavours such as regular Matrix Cola, Matrix Zero Cola, Matrix Fruit, Matrix Orange, Matrix Lemon, Matrix Up, and Matrix Zero Up.
