= Cool Mountain Beverages =

American soft drink manufacturer

- Type: Soft drink
- Manufacturer: Cool Mountain Beverages, Inc. (United States)
- Country of origin: United States
- Introduced: 1997

Incorporated in May 1997, Cool Mountain Beverages, Inc. (CMB) manufactures a line of gourmet sodas. The company is based in Des Plaines, Illinois, with franchise operations (through Dr Pepper Bottling) in West Jefferson, North Carolina, and Real Soda Ltd in Gardena, California. Cool Mountain Beverage products are licensed and distributed through franchisees throughout the U.S. The company's bag n box operations are based in Chicago, Illinois.

All Cool Mountain sodas are caffeine-free and manufactured with pure cane sugar.

When the company started, the soda label depicted an illustration of Native American Chief Hollow Horn Bear, a rendering inspired by a 14 cent stamp. In 2007, the label was changed to a rendering of Mount Rainier.

== Flavors ==
- Blue Razzberry
- Green Apple
- Strawberry Soda
- Black Cherry Soda
- Cream Soda
- Root Beer
- Orange Cream Soda
- Peach

The company is set to introduce flavored lemonades, mixers and spring water in 2013.
