= Shani (drink) =

Soft drink by PepsiCo

Shani شاني
- Type: Soft drink
- Manufacturer: PepsiCo
- Related products: Vimto

Shani (Arabic: شاني) is a berry-flavoured soft drink produced by PepsiCo. It is sold and marketed outside the United States. The drink is popular in the Middle East region.
