= Lattella =

Austrian soft drink

Logo

Lattella is a soft drink, invented by Hermann Horngacher in 1979, it is produced in Austria by the company Tirol Milch. It is a whey drink and is sweet and available in different flavours.

== History ==
From June 1997 to September 2003, Lattella was marketed and distributed by French company Danone, who contributed to its volume expansion through investments in quality, development and marketing. In September 2003, Danone handed over the marketing of Lattella in Austria to its brand owner, Tirol Milch.
