= Vinea (soft drink) =

Grape-based soft drink

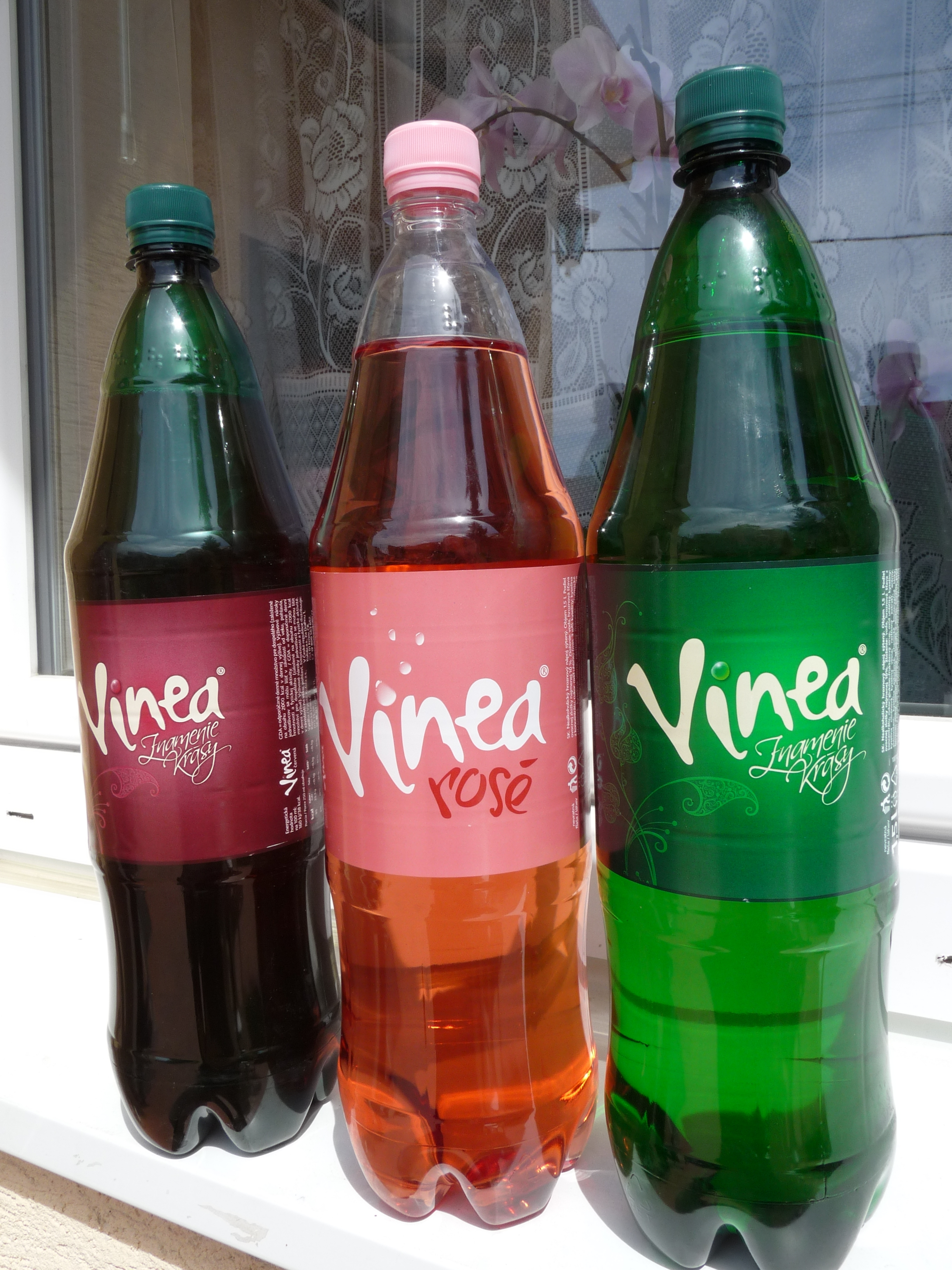
- Various flavours of Vinea
- Type: soft drink
- Manufacturer: Kofola, a.s.
- Origin: Czechoslovakia
- Introduced: 1973
- Colour: white, red, pink
- Ingredients: must

Vinea is a carbonated grape-based soft drink invented in Czechoslovakia in 1973 by Slovak Ján Farkaš, a biochemist working for the Research Institute for Viticulture and Wine-making in Bratislava. Production of the drink began in 1974. After years of trademark ownership disputes, Vinea was sold to Kofola in January 2008.
