= List of Coca-Cola brands =

The following is a list of products the Coca-Cola Company owns or has stake in, of which there are more than 500 in over 195 countries.

== A ==
- Abbey Well – bottled water available in the United Kingdom
- Ades – drinking water available in Indonesia
- Ades – soy-based drinks available in Latin America
- Alhambra – drinking water available in the United States
- Ambasa – soft drink sold in Japan and Korea
- Ameyal – fruit sodas available only in the cities of Cuernavaca and Toluca in Mexico
- Amita – fruit juice available in Greece
- Coca-Cola Andina – Bottler Company in Latin America
- Andina Frut/Andifrut – fruit juice available in Chile
- Andina Hi C – fruit juice available in Chile
- Andina Nectar – fruit juice available in Chile
- Apollinaris – German naturally sparkling mineral water
- Appletiser – Sparkling apple drink
- aquaBona – mineral water available in Portugal and Spain
- Aquactive – sports drink formerly sold in Spain
- Aquana – sports drink available in Belgium, Luxembourg, and Netherlands
- Aquapure
- Aquarius – sports drink
- Aquarius Spring – bottled water available in the United States
- Aqvaris
- Aqua Shot – flavored water available in New Zealand
- Arwa – mineral water sold across the Middle East
- Avra (spring water) – bottled water available in Greece
- Ayataka green tea
- Aybal-Kin
- aquasavana – water available in Zambia

== B ==
- Bacardi Mixers – a co-branded product with the Bacardi rum manufacturer. Tropical drinks available in the United States, Australia, and Spain
- Bankia – mineral water available in Bulgaria
- Barq's – root beer
- Barq's Floatz
- Barq's Red Crème Soda
- Beat – citrus-flavoured soft drink available in Mexico
- Belté
- Benedictino - bottled water available in Chile
- Beverly – Non-alcoholic bitter apéritif available in Italy
- Bibo – fruit punch available in Turkey, South Africa, Mozambique, Kenya and Canada
- Big Crush
- Big Tai
- Billson's Brewery - an Australia-based maker of ready-to-drink alcoholic beverages
- Bimbo
- Bimbo Break
- Bird's Nest
- Bistra – bottled water in Croatia
- Bistrone – Corn soup available in Japan
- Bjäre – Coca-Cola's own julmust, available in Sweden
- Black Cherry Vanilla Coca-Cola
- BlackFire
- Blue Sky
- Bodyarmor SuperDrink
- Boco
- Bom Bit Maesil
- BonAqua BonActive – grapefruit-flavored sports drink formerly available in Hong Kong and Macau, now replaced by Aquarius.
- Bonaqua/BonAqua/Bonaqa – bottled water, carbonated and noncarbonated, fruit-flavoured or unflavoured. Available in Hong Kong, parts of Europe, Asia, Africa, and South America. Called "aquaBona" in Portugal and Spain.
- BotaniQ – fruit-flavoured water available in Ukraine
- BPM Energy – Energy drink available in Ireland
- Brazzi – brand of juice drinks, sold in Iceland
- Bright And Early
- Brisa – Bottled water and fruit-flavoured water available in Colombia
- Burn – Energy drink available in Latin America, Europe, North Africa, and South Korea Known as "Buzz" in Japan

== C ==
- Cafe Zu – Canned coffee with ginseng available in Thailand
- Caffeine Free Barq's
- Caffeine-Free Coca-Cola – a caffeine free version of Coca-Cola introduced in 1983
- Caffeine-Free Diet Coke/Coca-Cola light – diet Coke with no caffeine
- Caffeine-Free New Coke – the caffeine-free version of New Coke
- Capri-Sun - a brand of juice drinks targeted primarily at children distributed by the Coca-Cola Company in select territories
- Cal King – yogurt drink available in Japan
- Calypso - a range of lemonade drinks
- Canning's – fruit-flavoured soft drink available in Trinidad & Tobago. Rebadged version of Fanta.
- Cappy – juice drink available in some parts of Europe and the Palestinian Territories
- Caprice
- Carioca
- Carver's
- Cascal
- Cepita del valle – juice drink available in Argentina
- Chaho
- Charrua
- Chaudfontaine – Mineral water from a spring in Belgium. It's available in Belgium and the Netherlands
- Chaywa – coffee sold at gas stations by means of vending machines across South Africa
- Cheers – fruit-flavoured soft drink available in Philippines
- Cherry Coke – cherry-flavored Coca-Cola
- Coca-Cola Cherry Float - Released 2026 - Cherry float-flavored Coca-Cola, also available in zero sugar.
- Chinotto – lemon-lime-flavored soft drink available in Venezuela. see Sprite.
- Chinotto light
- Chippewa
- Chivalry – fruit soda available in China
- Ciel – Purified, noncarbonated bottled water available in Angola, Mexico, and Morocco
- Ciel+ – flavored water available in Mexico
- Citra – later Fanta Citrus. Grapefruit-flavored soft drink
- Club
- Coca-Cola – Namesake Coca-Cola product
- Coca-Cola BlāK – Coca-Cola with coffee flavor added, now available as Coca-Cola Plus Coffee No Sugar
- Coca-Cola Black Cherry Vanilla – Replaced with Coca-Cola Vanilla in 2007
- Coca-Cola C2 – discontinued lo-carb and low sugar version
- Coca-Cola California Raspberry – Released 2018, a naturally flavored variant of Coca-Cola sweetened with cane sugar.
- Coca-Cola Citra – a citrus cola, available only in Japan
- Coca-Cola Clear – a clear cola, available in Japan
- Coca-Cola Energy Energy Drink, available in the United Kingdom and much of Europe.
- Coca-Cola Georgia Peach – Released 2018, a naturally flavored variant of Coca-Cola sweetened with cane sugar.
- Coca-Cola Life – a cola with less sugar and sweetened with cane sugar and stevia
- Coca-Cola Light (see Diet Coke)
- Coca-Cola with Lemon 2005 Limited edition, available only in some places in Europe along with its Zero counterpart
- Coca-Cola with Lime – lime-flavored Coke
- Coca-Cola Move – 2023 limited edition
- Coca-Cola with No Calories and with Sweeteners from the Plant Stevia – a cola with no calories and sweetened with stevia extracts. Currently available in Greece
- Coca-Cola Plus - A health-conscious Coca-Cola containing dietary fibre, launched in Japan in 2017
- Coca-Cola Raspberry – a test marketed raspberry-flavored Coke. Only in Finland and New Zealand
- Coca-Cola Stevia No Sugar – a test product as a replacement for Coca-Cola Life. Launched only in New Zealand in 2018.
- Coca-Cola Orange – 2007 limited edition, available only in the UK
- Coca-Cola Orange Vanilla – Released 2019 - the zero sugar version was also released.
- Coca-Cola Oreo zero sugar, available in the UK
- Coca-Cola Starlight – 2022 limited edition, available in North America.
- Coca-Cola Stevia – Released 2019, available only in Canada, test product as a potential replacement for the current Coca-Cola Life.
- Coca-Cola Zero Sugar – diet version of Coca-Cola, sister product of Diet Coke
- Cocoteen
- Coke II – Re-formulated Coca-Cola, replaced original formula Coca-Cola as "New Coke" for a brief time in 1985. Re-branded Coke II in 1992. Discontinued ca. 2002.
- Colette Cola – discontinued, was only available in the German Democratic Republic
- Costa Coffee – British coffee chain and is served worldwide.
- Cresta
- Cristal – mineral water
- Cumberland Gap
- Crystal - bottled water in Mauritius

== D ==
- Daft Cola – The same as Mexican Coke, but put in limited edition Daft Punk bottles and sold exclusively in French clubs
- Daizu no Susume – grapefruit-flavored soy soft drink available in Japan
- DANNON and Danone (under license)
- Dasani – Bottled water
- Dasani Active
- Dasani Balance
- Dasani Flavors – flavored and lightly sweetened water
- Dasani Nutriwater
- Dasani Plus – Vitamin-enhanced flavored water
- Dasani Sensations
- Deep River Rock – bottled water available in Ireland
- Delaware Punch – fruit-flavored, non-carbonated soft drink, discontinued due to/in response to the COVID-19 pandemic
- Del Valle – Mexican nectars and juices, acquired by The Coca-Cola Company and bottler Coca-Cola FEMSA in 2007
- DESCA
- Diet A&W (Under license)
- Diet Andina Frut/Andina Frut light
- Diet Andina Nectar/Andina Nectar light
- Diet Barq's
- Diet Cherry Coke – diet version of Cherry Coke
- Diet Coke/Coke Light – Low-calorie version of Coca-Cola (formerly known as Diet Coca-Cola or Coca-Cola Light), sister product of Coca-Cola Zero
- Diet Coke Black Cherry Vanilla – the ill-fated black cherry vanilla diet Coke
- Diet Coke Citra/Coca-Cola light Citra – Coca-Cola light (diet Coke) with lemon-lime flavor
- Diet Coke Plus – Diet Coke fortified with vitamins
- Diet Coke Sweetened with Splenda – diet Coke with splenda instead of aspartame
- Diet Coke with Lemon/Coca-Cola light with Lemon – a lemon-flavored diet Coke
- Diet Coke with Lime/Coca-Cola light with Lime – a lime-flavored diet Coke
- Diet Coke with Raspberry
- Diet Crush – diet version of Crush
- Diet Dr. Pepper
- Diet Fanta/Fanta light/Fanta Zero/Fanta Free – diet versions of Fanta
- Diet Freskyta – diet version of Freskyta
- Diet Inca Kola – diet version of Inca Kola
- Diet Kia Ora – diet version of Kia Ora
- Diet Krest – diet version of Krest
- Diet Lift/Lift light – diet version of Lift
- Diet Lilt/Lilt Zero – diet versions of Lilt
- Diet Master Pour – diet version of Master Pour
- Diet Mello Yello – diet version of Mello Yello
- Diet Nestea/Nestea light/Nestea Sin Azúcar – diet versions of Nestea
- Diet Northern Neck Ginger Ale/Northern Neck Diet Ginger Ale - diet version of ginger ale, discontinued due to/in response to the COVID-19 pandemic
- Diet Oasis – diet version of Oasis
- Diet Quatro/Quatro light – diet version of Quatro
- Diet Sarsi – Root beer-flavored soft drink
- Diet Schweppes (Under license)
- Diet Seagrams – diet version of Seagrams
- Diet Sport
- Diet Sprite/Sprite light – diet version of Sprite
- Diet Tai/Tai light – diet version of Tai
- Diet Vanilla Coke – diet version of Vanilla Coke
- Diva
- Dobry (brand) ("Kind" in Russian)
- Doğazen – drinking spring water in Turkey
- Dorna – Sparkling mineral water available in Romania and Moldova
- Dr. Pepper- Only in Europe & S. Korea (Dr. Pepper is an independently owned company elsewhere)
- Dr. Pepper Zero Sugar - Only in Europe (Dr. Pepper is an independently owned company elsewhere)
- Drim
- Dunkin' Donuts – Released 2017, ready-to-drink iced coffee beverages available in Original, French Vanilla, Mocha, Espresso, Cookies & Cream and Pumpkin Spice flavors.
- Dunkin' Donuts Shot In The Dark – Released 2018, ready-to-drink iced espresso beverages available in Mocha, Vanilla and Caramel flavors.

== E ==
- Earth & Sky – Available in the Philippines
- Eight O'Clock – non-carbonated powdered juice drink available in the Philippines
- Eight O'Clock Funchum
- El Rayek
- Elephant Available in Sri Lanka
- Escuis
- Escuis light
- Eva Water
- Enviga – fruit-flavored green tea available in Austria, Belgium Czech Republic, Hungary, Netherlands, Slovakia, Spain, and the United States
- Emotion – Available in many countries

== F ==
- Fairlife – United States
- Fanta – several fruit-flavored soft drinks (different for each region)
- Fanta J-Lemon – Available in Thailand
- Fanta J-Melon – Available in Thailand
- Fanta Lactic – Milk drink available in Hong Kong, Macau, Taiwan, and the United States
- Fanta Portello (Sri Lanka only)
- Fanta Shokata
- Far Coast – coffee and tea brand in Canada
- Fernandes – several tropical fruit-flavored soft drinks only available in Suriname, the Netherlands, and the Caribbean Netherlands
- Finley
- Fioravanti – fruit-flavored soft drink available in Ecuador (1878) and Spain (2006)
- Five Alive – Five-fruit juice blends available in Kenya, Nigeria, Tanzania, Uganda, and the United Kingdom
- Five Alive (US) – Blend of five citrus juices available in Canada and the United States
- Fizz – A carbonated tamarind drink produced in Lebanon.
- Flavor Rage
- Floatz
- Fontana
- Fraser & Neave
- Freezits
- Fresca – flavored caffeine-free, calorie-free soft drink
- Fresca 1 – grapefruit-flavored soft drink available in Costa Rica, Mexico, and Panama
- Frescolita
- Freskyta
- Fresquinha
- Fress – First introduced in Japan 2004
- Frestea (under license)
- Fria – fruit-flavored soft drinks bottled in Curaçao
- Frisco – fruit-flavored carbonated soft drink available in Finland and Lithuania
- Frucci
- Frugos
- Frugos Fresh
- Fruita – (South Australia)
- Fruitia
- Fruitlabo
- Fruitopia – non-carbonated soft drinks
- Fruitopia Freeze
- Fruitopia Tea
- Fruktime
- Frutina
- Frutee - variant of Fanta only sold on the Caribbean island of Barbados
- Frutonic – Lightly carbonated soft drink available in Belgium, Luxembourg, and New Zealand
- Full Throttle – Citrus-flavored energy drink available in the United States and Canada
- Full Throttle Blue Demon – Agave Lime Tangerine energy drink available in the United States
- Full Throttle Sugar Free
- Full Throttle Coffee
- Fuze Beverage – vitamin infused juice and tea drinks available in the United States and Ecuador
- Fuzetea

== G ==
- Genki No Moto
- Georgia – coffee drink available in Bahrain, India, Japan, South Korea, Qatar, Oman, Saudi Arabia, and the United Arab Emirates It is also available in the United States exclusively through Japanese Supermarkets.
- Georgia Cafe au Lait
- Georgia Club – coffee beverage available in Singapore, Japan, and India
- Georgia Gold
- Gini
- Glacéau – vitamin water sold in the United States, Britain, and France, and Canada
- Glacéau Fruitwater – sold in the United States
- Glacéau smartwater – sold in the United States and China
- Glacéau Vitaminenergy – sold in the United States
- Glacéau Vitaminwater – sold in the United States
- Glacéau Vitaminwater zero – sold in the United States
- Gladiator – an energy drink available in Mexico and Brazil
- Godiva Belgian Blends – Co-branded coffee/chocolate drink with Godiva, available in the United States
- Gold Peak Tea – iced tea drink, lemon-flavored, green, diet, unflavored, and diet unflavored, available in the United States
- Gold Spot
- Golden Crush
- Goulburn Valley
- Grapette
- Groovy
- Guaraná Jesus
- Guaraná Kuat light
- Guaraná Kuat Zero

== H ==
- Hajime – Green tea available in Japan
- H2OK
- Hansen's
- Happy Valley
- Haru no Mint Shukan
- Haru Green Tea – tea drink available in South Korea
- Hawaï – Tropical sparkling soda that originated in Morocco (1991). It can now also be found in the Netherlands, Belgium, France, Spain and Tunisia. (2020)
- Healthworks
- Hero
- Hi-C – juice drink available in the United States and Philippines
- Hi-C Tea – tea drinks available in Costa Rica, El Salvador, Hong Kong, Indonesia, Macau, Mariana Islands, Nicaragua, and Philippines
- Hires
- Hi Spot
- Hit – fruit-flavoured carbonated soft drink available in Venezuela See Fanta.
- Honest Tea – tea sold in USA
- Hot Point
- Horizon
- Huang – tea available in Japan
- Hubert's – lemonade and juices

== I ==
- Ice Dew (冰露) – bottled water available in China
- Ice mountain – bottled water available in Singapore
- Ikon
- i Lohas - bottled water available in Japan and Taiwan
- Inca Kola – soft drink available in Peru, Bolivia, Ecuador, Chile, and Sweden It's also available in Spain, America and Canada through Latin American food stores.
- Innocent Drinks – Took control in 2013
- Ipsei
- Iron Brew – South African soft drink
- Izvorul Alb

== J ==
- Jaz Cola – cola specifically developed for consumers who live in the Visayan Islands in the Philippines
- Jericho – mineral water from Jericho
- Jet Tonic
- Jinmeile
- Jolly Juice
- Joy
- Joya – flavor sodas Available in some cities of Mexico
- Jozuni Yasai
- Jurassic Well
- Just Juice
- Juta

== K ==
- Kevin Harris – Available in Chile and Brazil
- Kapo Axion
- Kapo Super Power
- Keri
- Keringet Mineral water
- Kia-Ora
- Kidsfruitz
- Kilimanjaro (water)
- Kin – bottled water available in Argentina. Known as Benedictino since 2021.
- Kin Cider – a lemon-lime-flavored soft drink in South Korea
- Kin Light
- Kinley – This brand is used by two types of drinks:
1. Bottled still water available in Bangladesh, Bulgaria, Pakistan, India, Sri Lanka, Maldives, and Nigeria
2. A carbonated water with a wide array of variants: tonic, bitter lemon, club soda, and fruit-flavored. Available in Austria, Belgium, Bulgaria, Czech Republic, Denmark, El Salvador, Germany, Hungary, India, Israel, Italy, Lithuania, Luxembourg, Maldives, Moldova, Nepal, Netherlands, Norway, Poland, Romania, Slovakia, Sweden, Switzerland, United States, West Bank-Gaza, and Zambia
- Kiwi Blue – bottled water available in New Zealand
- KMX – a multidimensional energy drink available in Puerto Rico and the United States
- Kochakaden – flavored tea available in Japan
- Kola Inglesa
- Koumi Soukai
- Krest
- Kristal Water – bottled water, available in Malta only
- Kropla Beskidu – bottled water, available in Poland only
- Kuat – Guarana soft drink available in Brazil and the United States
- Kuat Light
- Kuli
- “Kruzhka i Bochka" kvass – Russia&Ukraine
- Kyun
- KisT – Sold in Panama. (Panama version of Fanta)

== L ==
- Leed
- Lift – fruit juice soft drink. Available in: Albania, Australia, Belgium, Bulgaria, Colombia, Czech Republic, Fiji, Germany, Guatemala, Hungary, North Macedonia, Mexico, New Zealand, Philippines, Poland, Slovakia, United States, and Vanuatu
- Lift plus
- Lift Plus light
- Lilia – Natural mineral water available in Italy
- Lilt
- Limca – Lemon-lime soft drink available in India, Nepal, Nigeria, Saudi Arabia, the United Arab Emirates, and Zambia
- Limelite
- Limonade
- Linnuse
- Lion
- Love Body – Red oolong tea diet drink with dietary fiber available in Japan
- Lemon & Paeroa (L&P) – Distributed in New Zealand and recently in Australia

== M ==
- Maaza – Mango juice drink with added calcium available in Pakistan, Bangladesh, India, Netherlands, and Maldives
- Mad River
- Magnolia
- Magnolia Funch
- Magnolia Zip
- Malvern Water – bottled spring water available worldwide under the Schweppes brand
- Manantial – bottled water available in Colombia
- Manzana Lift
- Manzana Mia
- Mare Rosso – Non-alcoholic bitter soft drink available in Spain
- Marocha Chaba no Ko – Unflavored green tea drink available in Japan
- Master Chill
- Master Pour
- Matusov Pramen
- Mazoe
- Meijin
- Mello
- Mello Yello – Citrus soft-drink available in American Samoa, Canada, Guam, Japan, Mariana Islands, and the United States
- Mello Yello Zero
- Mer – juice drink available in Sweden
- Mezzo Mix light orange-flavored Coke
- Miami
- Mickey's Adventures – Vitamin-enriched juice drink available in Austria, Belgium, Dominican Republic, France, Hong Kong, Mexico, Netherlands, Portugal, Slovakia, Spain, and Switzerland
- Mickey & Friends – fruit juice available in Japan
- Migoro-Nomigoro
- Minaqua
- Minute Maid – brand of juice drinks, with a sub-brand of fruit-flavored soda which contains some fruit juice
- Minute Maid Active – orange juice drink enriched with Glucosamine HCI available in the United States
- Minute Maid AntiOx – Combination of fruit juices with antioxidizing properties available in Spain
- Minute Maid Clásicos – Unsweetened fruit juices available in Spain
- Minute Maid Coolers – fruit beverages available in the United States
- Minute Maid Deli
- Minute Maid Duofrutas – Mix of fruit juice, skimmed milk, and vitamins available in Spain
- Minute Maid Fresh
- Minute Maid Fruit Plus – juice drink available in Japan
- Minute Maid Heart Wise – orange juice drink naturally sourced with plant sterols available in the United States
- Minute Maid Hi-C – Available in Costa Rica
- Minute Maid Juice Box – 100% juice drink available in the United States
- Minute Maid Juice To Go – juice drink marketed in plastic bottles to drink on the go available in the United States
- Minute Maid Just 10 – fruit punch-flavored juice drink available in the United States
- Minute Maid Lemonades and Fruit Drinks – fruit drink available in the United States
- Minute Maid Light – Low calorie fruit drinks available in the United States
- Minute Maid Limón&Nada – Lemonade drink available in Spain
- Minute Maid Mais – Ready-to-drink juice drink available in Brazil
- Minute Maid Multi-Vitamin – orange juice enriched with vitamins and minerals available in the United States
- Minute Maid Nutri+ – flavored milk drink available in Mexico and Vietnam
- Minute Maid Premium – 100% fruit juices available in Spain
- Minute Maid Premium Lemonades and Punches – juice drinks available in the United States
- Minute Maid Premium Orange Juice and Premium Blends (Frozen & Refrigerated) – fruit drinks available in the United States
- Minute Maid Pulpy Orange – Drink with orange pulp and flavors available in India
- Minute Maid Selección – fruit juices and nectars available in Spain
- Minute Maid SojaPlus – Drink with fruit juice and soy available in Spain
- Minute Maid Soft Drink
- Minute Maid Splash
- Mireille
- Mone
- Monsoon
- Montefiore
- Mori No Mizudayori – bottled water available in Japan
- Morning Deli – fruit drink available in Japan
- Mother (100% Natural Energy) – Canned energy drink available in Australia since late 2006
- Mount Franklin – bottled water available in Australia
- Mountain Creed
- Mountain Creed Zero Sugar
- Moxie – regional Maine soda
- Moya semya
- Mr. Pibb — soft drink
- Mr. Pibb Zero Sugar — no calorie soft drink
- Multiva – bottled water available in Poland
- Multivita

== N ==
- N-Juice
- Nada
- Nagomi
- Nalu – kiwi-flavored, low in calories soft drink available in Belgium, Luxembourg, and Netherlands
- Namthip – bottled water available in Thailand
- Nanairo Acha
- Nativa – yerba mate-flavored, briefly available in Argentina
- Naturaqua
- Nature's Own – flavored mineral water available in Papuva Nueva Guinea
- Nectar Andina
- Nectarin
- Neptūnas - bottled water available in Baltic countries (Lithuania, Latvia & Estonia)
- Nevada – bottled water available in Venezuela
- Neverfail – bottled water available in Australia
- New Coke
- NeXstep
- Next
- Nico's Brassness
- Nordic Mist – Line of adult mixers soft drink available in Chile, Finland, Portugal, and Spain
- Northern Neck Ginger Ale - ginger ale discontinued due to/in response to the COVID-19 pandemic
- NOS (drink)
- Nutri Boost
- Nusta

== O ==
- Oasis – Non-carbonated juice drink available in Belgium, United Kingdom, Ireland, Malta, France, and the Netherlands
- Odwalla – juice drinks and natural health beverages available in the United States and Canada
- OOHA
- Old Colony
- Olimpija
- OK Soda
- Oreo Coke, a limited time release of Coca-Cola, sold alongside an Oreo Cookie flavor, sold in Canada, US, Europe, Asia, Australia,

== P ==
- PopCola
- Paani
- Pacific Orchard
- Pampa
- Pams
- Peace Tea
- Pearona
- Peats Ridge Springs
- Pepe Rico
- Piko
- Pilskalna
- Planet Java
- Play
- Pocarrot
- Pocket Dr.
- Poiana Negri – Sparkling water available in Romania
- Poms – sour apple-flavored soft drink available in Morocco and in Canada
- Ponkana – juice drink available in Philippines
- Pop Cola – Available in the Philippines
- Portello
- Powerade – sports drink
- Powerade alive
- Powerade light
- Powerade Option
- Powerade Zero
- Powerplay
- Pulp Ananas
- Pump – bottled water and flavoured water available in Australia, South Africa, New Zealand, and Fiji
- Pure Joy (纯悦) – bottled water available in China

== Q ==
- Qoo – non-carbonated drink available in Japan
- Quatro – grapefruit and lemon-flavoured soft drink available in Argentina, Chile, Colombia, and Uruguay
- Quwat Jabal – citrus-flavoured soft drink available in the Middle East

== R ==
- Ramblin' Root Beer
- Rani juice – a fruit-based juice available in the Middle East.
- Raspberry Coke
- Ready to Brew
- Real – mineral sparkling water in Moldova
- Real Gold – Energy drink available in Japan
- Red Flash
- Red Lion
- Refresh Tea
- Relentless
- Rich
- Richy
- RimZim – cumin seed-flavoured soft drink available in Bangladesh and India
- Rio Gold
- Ripe N Ready
- Risco
- Riwa
- RiverRock - Irish mineral water
- Robinson Brothers
- Römerquelle – Austrian mineral water
- Rosa – still and sparkling mineral water available in Serbia
- Rosalta
- Roses
- Royal Club Shandy
- Royal Tru – an orange-flavored soft drink available in the Philippines
- Royal Tru light – light version of Royal Tru Orange

== S ==
- Safia
- Samantha
- Samurai – an energy drink available in Vietnam and Philippines
- San Luis – bottled water available in Peru
- San Sao
- Santiba – Soda and ginger ale available in the United States in the 1970s
- Santolin
- Sarsi – root beer brand available in the Philippines
- Saryusaisai – tea drink available in Japan
- SchiBe Balls – a bubbly brown drink
- Schweppes (Under license)
- Scorpion – energy drink available in Japan and India
- Seagram's – Ginger ale, club soda, seltzer, and tonic water available in Mexico, Norway, Sweden, Trinidad & Tobago, U.S. Virgin Islands and the United States
- Seasons
- Seltz
- Sensation
- Sensun
- Senzao – guaraná-flavoured carbonated soft drink available in Mexico
- Shichifukuzen
- Shizen Plus – Green tea blended with complementary natural herb extracts. Available in Thailand
- Shock
- Signature
- Sim
- Simba
- Simply Apple
- Simply Lemonade
- Simply Limeade
- Simply Orange – Pasteurized orange juice available in the United States
- Simply Pop - Juicy soda drink
- Sintonia
- Sky Cola
- Slap
- Smart – Carbonated soft drink developed by Coca-Cola for consumers in China
- Smart Water
- Sobo
- Sodafruit Caprice Oranges
- Sokenbicha – Blended tea drink available in Japan and the United States
- Sonfil
- Soonsoo 100
- Southern Sun
- Sparkle
- Sparkling Yogurt – Carbonated yogurt manufactured by Global Beverage Ent. Inc.
- Sparletta – a range of sodas, including cream soda and Iron Brew
- Splash – a clear soft drink available since 1995 in the autonomous community of Andalusia, Spain
- Splice – a lemon-lime soda
- Sport Cola
- Sport Plus
- Spring! by Dannon – bottled spring water available in the United States
- Spring! by Dannon Fluoride to Go – Fluoridated spring water available in the United States
- Sprite – lemon-lime-flavored soft drink
- Sprite 3G
- Sprite Cranberry
- Sprite Ice
- Sprite Remix
- Sprite Light
- Sprite Zero
- Spur
- Stoney Ginger Beer
- Sugar Free Full Throttle
- Sun Valley
- Sunfill – juice drink available in parts of Asia, Africa, Europe, and the United States
- Sunfilled & Fruit Tree
- Supa
- Superkools
- Supper Cola – brand of soft drinks and juices in Pakistan
- Surge – Citrus soda, discontinued 2003, re-released in 2014 as an Amazon exclusive and later in 2015 in fountains at Burger King restaurants. Retail re-release in 2018 in 16oz cans.
- Svali – brand of juice drinks, sold in Iceland
- Sweecha
- Swerve – Sweetened milk formerly available in three flavors – a vanilla-banana flavour called Vanana, a blueberry-strawberry flavour called Blooo, and a chocolate flavour

== T ==
- Tab – Coke's original diet soda, sweetened with saccharin, discontinued in 2020, due to/in response to the COVID-19 pandemic
- Tab Energy
- Tab x-tra
- TADAS
- Tahitian Treat
- Tai
- Tanora
- Tarumi
- Tavern
- Tepelene - still and sparkling mineral water available in Albania and Kosovo
- The Tea for Dining
- Tea World Collection
- The Kearnels Homebrew – tea beverage available in Taiwan
- The Spirit of Georgia – competitive product to Bionade available in Germany
- The Wellness
- Thextons
- This Water – Coca-Cola is a 58% shareholder in parent company Innocent Drinks
- Thums Up – Carbonated soft drink in India and Bangladesh
- Thunder – Fruit-flavored energy drink available in the Philippines, replacing Samurai.
- Tian Tey – tea available in Belgium
- Tian Yu Di/Heaven and Earth – tea drinks and bottled water available in Hong Kong, Mariana Islands, and Singapore
- Tiky – Pineapple-flavored soft drink available in Guatemala
- Top
- Topo Chico – Sparkling water bottled in Mexico
- Toppur – flavored and unflavoured sparkling water available in Iceland
- Top's
- Tropical – chain of flavors in El Salvador
- Tropico (soft drink) - brand of juice drinks in France
- Trópí – brand of juice drinks, sold in Iceland (has of 2019 been rebranded into the international version: Minute Maid)
- Turkuaz – drinking water in Turkey
- Twist

== U ==
- Ultra Energy – energy drink, available in Serbia
- Urge - energy drink originating in Norway, available in Scandinavia
- Urun

== V ==
- Valle – orange Juice sold in South America
- Valpre – bottled water available in South Africa
- Valser – flavored and unflavoured bottled water available in Germany, Russia, and Switzerland
- Vanilla Coke
- Vault – hybrid energy citrus soda (discontinued)
- Vault Zero (discontinued)
- VegitaBeta
- Vica
- Victoria – fruit sodas available only in the state of Querétaro in Mexico
- Vita – orange-flavored juice drink available in Zambia
- Vital – bottled water available in Chile
- ViO
- Vital O
- Vitamin Water
- Vitingo
- Viva/Viva! – mineral water available in the Philippines
- Vlasinska Rosa – water packaged in Serbian Vlasina factory (purchased by Coca-Cola HBC in 2005), best selling non sparkling water in the region

== W ==
- Water Salad
- Wilkins – distilled drinking water available in the Philippines
- Winnie the Pooh Junior Juice

== Y ==
- Yang Guang – literal meaning "Sunshine"; flavored tea (China)
- Yang Guang Juicy T
- Yoli – lemon-lime soda (only in Acapulco, Guerrero, Mexico)
- Youki
- Yumi
