= Jugos del Valle =

Mexican fruit juice and beverage producer

Jugos del Valle S.A. de C.V.
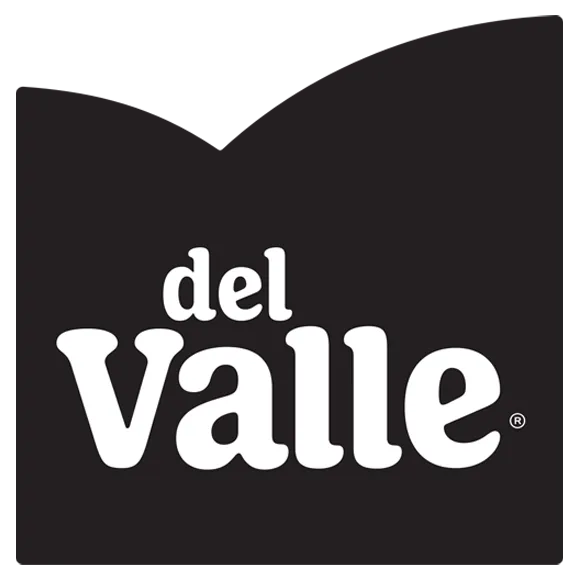
- Type: Subsidiary
- Industry: Retail
- Founded: Vallejo, Azcapotzalco, Mexico City (1947)
- Founder: Luis Cetto
- Headquarters: Tepotzotlán, Mexico State, Mexico
- Area served: Mexico; United States; Brazil; Puerto Rico; Paraguay; Chile; Argentina; Colombia; Central America
- Products: fruit juices and beverages, snacks
- Brands: Del Valle; Florida 7 Clam Twist; Frutsi; Bebere; Pulpy; Andina del Valle (Chile); Cepita Del Valle (Argentina); Powerade (bottler); Ciel (bottler); Burn (bottler); Gladiator (bottler); Energy Brands (bottler); Fuze (bottler)
- Owner: The Coca-Cola Company
- Parent: Coca-Cola FEMSA; Sidral Mundet; Arca Continental; Leche Santa Clara

Jugos del Valle (Del Valle Juices) is a Mexican producer of fruit juices and beverages. Founded in 1947, today Jugos del Valle is one of the leading food, juice and beverage companies in Mexico producing popular brands such as Del Valle, Florida 7, Frutsi, Bebere, among others, also acting as a bottler for some Coca-Cola drinks such as Powerade, Energy Brands and Gladiator Energy Drink. Operations range from the US, to Brazil, Venezuela, Puerto Rico, Chile, Argentina, Colombia, and most parts of Central America. Since 2007 is a wholly owned subsidiary of Coca-Cola FEMSA, the main Mexican bottler of Coca-Cola.

== History ==
In 1947, following a long career in the wine industry, Santiago Ovalle to commercialize grape juice, which led to the opening of Jugos del Valle's first factory in Santa Marta, Santa Marta. A second factory, now the most important operations center of the company, opened in 1968 in Tepotzotlán.

After a group of investors led by P. E. Manuel Albarrán Macouzet acquired the company in 1978, the "Frutsi" brand was launched in 1982 in 355 millilitres (12.5 imp fl oz; 12.0 US fl oz) glass containers. The "Botellín" brand followed in 1988, the same year that Jugos del Valle first exported its products to the US.

In 1992, a new juice plant opened in Zacatecas, which also produced fruit pulp used in different products and exported nectars worldwide in aluminum cans. Jugos del Valle became a public company in 1994. At the same time the company established the most modern waste water treatment plant in Latin America and launched a new juice called "Mini Valle" in a 250 millilitres (8.8 imp fl oz; 8.5 US fl oz) cardboard container.

The "Valle Practic" brand was brought to the market in 1995, the first of its kind to have an easy open cardboard container. "Val-Vita" was created to enhance production and commercialization of alimentary products. In 1996, the company launched "Jumbo Practic" in an easy open container, the only product from Del Valle that contains 2 litres (0.44 imp gal; 0.53 US gal) of juice. In the same year the company established its first international subsidiary in the United States.

In 1997 Del Valle started selling fruit pulp to national and international clients and established a second subsidiary in Brazil. The following year, the company acquired Company Barrilitos and launched "Apretón", a product which used the first metalized plastic container on the market. Del Valle Brazil opened its first production factory in Americana, São Paulo in 1999.

Charlene McArthur de Albarrán (she is namesake with a Utah, USA, politician) formally created the Grupo Del Valle Foundation in 2002. The move allowed many people to have a house and a proper nutrition. In 2005, the group's steering committee placed the Director General of Del Valle in charge of worldwide operations at the request of the board of directors. The company then acquired Infonet, which allowed it to enter strategic alliances with companies such as Tetra Pak. "Del Valle Light" was brought to the market in the same year. In 2006, the soy-based "Del Valle Soya" was launched and a new factory inaugurated in Monterrey.

The following year, Del Valle and Coca-Cola FEMSA S.A.B. de C.V./The Coca-Cola Company announced a trading agreement, which allowed Coca-Cola to increase its presence in Latin America and Del Valle to increase its level of distribution 15 times. Since 2007 Jugos Del Valle portfolio brands are part of Coca-Cola FEMSA and distributed in Mexico, United States, and most parts of Latin America.

Following the merging with Coca-Cola operations, Del Valle started to bottle brands like "Gladiator" and "Valle Fruit" in 2008 while "Powerade" was relaunched as part of this. Also as a part of the conditions imposed for the buying by the COFECO, Coca-Cola had to finish the distribution of Barrilitos soda brand among Mexico. The Barrilitos brand is still distributed in the United States by Arca Continental/Coca-Cola while in Mexico these rights are owned by local bottler Del Fruto, totally unrelated to the former company.

== Markets ==
Products are exported to countries including the US, Spain, Brazil and El Salvador with a presence in more than 30 countries on five continents.

=== Brazil ===
Sucos del Valle or Jugos del Valle Do Brasil covers up to 70% of the Brazilian market, and is considered the leading brand in the country. The São Paulo plant has a monthly production capacity of 10 million liters. The company manufactures a range of products including light juices as well as orange juice with honey and coconut juice. The specialization in production has allowed it to enter the European and Asian markets while maintaining its presence in the Mexican market.

=== United States ===
Jugos del Valle has had a presence in the Texas market for more than 10 years through Hispanic markets. The US export market for the company is now worth $42 million per annum.

== Products ==
Del Valle has many products, and who has been present in international markets since 1994.

=== Juices and nectars ===
- Del Valle: Principal brand released in 1947.
- Del Valle Reserve: Juices and nectars of different berries.
- Florida 7: Frozen juices and concentrates.
- Clam Twist: Tomato and clam juice.

=== Children's Drinks ===
- Frutsi

=== Orangeades ===
- Bebere: Sold in one gallon containers and often bought by housewives.

=== Fruit drinks ===
- Del Valle Pulpy: Contains fruit pieces.

=== Isotonic ===
- Powerade

=== Energy drinks ===
- Burn: Fortified with caffeine.
- Gladiator

=== Teas ===
- Fuze Tea: Coca-Cola's first global tea brand.
