= Nalu =

Nalu may refer to:

== Organisations ==
- National Army for the Liberation of Uganda
- National Amalgamated Labourers' Union, a trade union in the UK active from 1889 to 1921
- National Agricultural Labourers' Union, a trade union in the UK active from 1872 to 1896

== Other uses ==
- Nalu (drink)
- Nalu people, West Africa
- Nalu language, spoken by the Nalu people
- Nalu at Fulham Correctional Centre, a prison unit in Australia
- Nalu River (纳噜水): another name for the Liao River in China
- Prince Nalu, a character in Barbie: Fairytopia and Barbie: Mermaidia

== See also ==
- Naluo language (disambiguation)
- Nalus, a city in Iran
