= Tab (drink) =

Diet cola brand

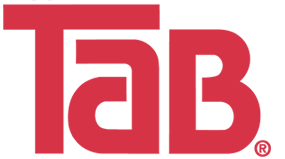

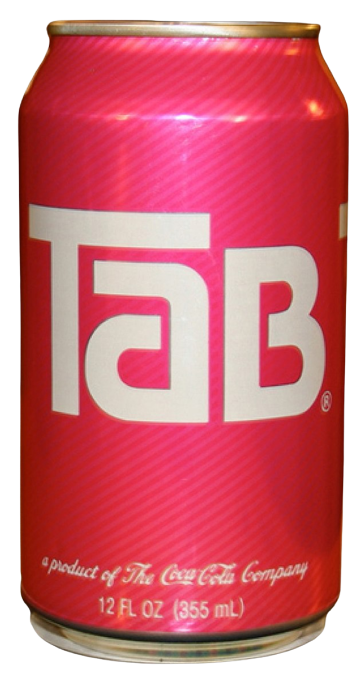
- 12 fl oz (355 mL) can of Tab
- Type: Soft drink
- Manufacturer: The Coca-Cola Company
- Origin: United States
- Introduced: 1963; 63 years ago
- Discontinued: December 31, 2020; 5 years ago
- Color: Caramel
- Flavor: Diet cola
- Variants: Tab Clear: Tab X-Tra; Tab Energy
- Related products: Diet Coke: Coca-Cola Zero Sugar
- Website: us.coca-cola.com/tab

Tab (stylized as TaB) is a diet cola soft drink produced and distributed by The Coca-Cola Company. It was introduced in 1963 as the company's first diet drink, and was produced until its discontinuation in 2020. Several variations were made, including a number of fruit-flavored, root beer, and ginger ale versions. Caffeine-free and clear variations were released in the late 1980s and early 1990s, and a Tab-branded energy drink was released in 2006, though it used a different formula from the standard cola.

Following studies in the early 1970s that linked saccharin, Tab's main sweetener, with bladder cancer in rats, the United States Congress mandated warning labels on products containing the sweetener. The label requirement was later repealed when no plausibility was found for saccharin causing cancer in humans.

Tab was popular among some people throughout the 1960s and 1970s as an alternative to Coca-Cola. It did not gain much attention in international markets, however. Tab's popularity declined after the Coca-Cola company's launch of Diet Coke in 1982. Coca-Cola continued to produce Tab in the United States, though in considerably smaller quantities than its more popular mainstay beverages, such as Coca-Cola and Diet Coke. According to the company, three million cases of Tab were made in 2011, and the beverage retained a cult following. Coca-Cola discontinued Tab at the end of 2020.

== History ==
Tab was created in 1963 by Coca-Cola after the successful sales and marketing of Diet Rite cola, owned by the Royal Crown Company. Previously, Diet Rite had been the only sugarless soda on the market. Tab was marketed to consumers who wanted to "keep tabs" on their weight.

Coca-Cola's marketing research department used its IBM 1401 computer to generate a list of over 185,000 four-letter words with one vowel, adding names suggested by the company's own staff; the list was stripped of any words deemed unpronounceable or too similar to existing trademarks. Of a final list of about twenty names, "Tabb" was chosen, influenced by the possible play on words, and shortened to "Tab" during development. Packaging designer Robert Sidney Dickens gave the name the capitalization pattern ("TaB") used in the logo as well as creating a new bottle design for the soft drink.

For a time in the 1970s, Coca-Cola introduced six variety flavors of Tab (all of which were also sugar-free): Root Beer, Lemon-Lime, Ginger Ale, Black Cherry, Strawberry, and Orange. A caffeine-free version of the original Tab flavor was introduced in 1983, alongside caffeine-free versions of Coca-Cola and Diet Coke. Tab Clear, a caramel color-free version of Tab, was released in the United States in 1992, and subsequently in the United Kingdom and Japan, in order to confuse consumers into thinking the new rival Crystal Pepsi was a diet cola and thereby limit its appeal. Tab Clear was discontinued in 1994.

In 2006, Coca-Cola introduced Tab Energy. Though it shares the Tab branding, its formula is entirely different from that of the standard cola: it is sweetened with sucralose and has a sour, tart flavor.

=== Saccharin safety debate ===
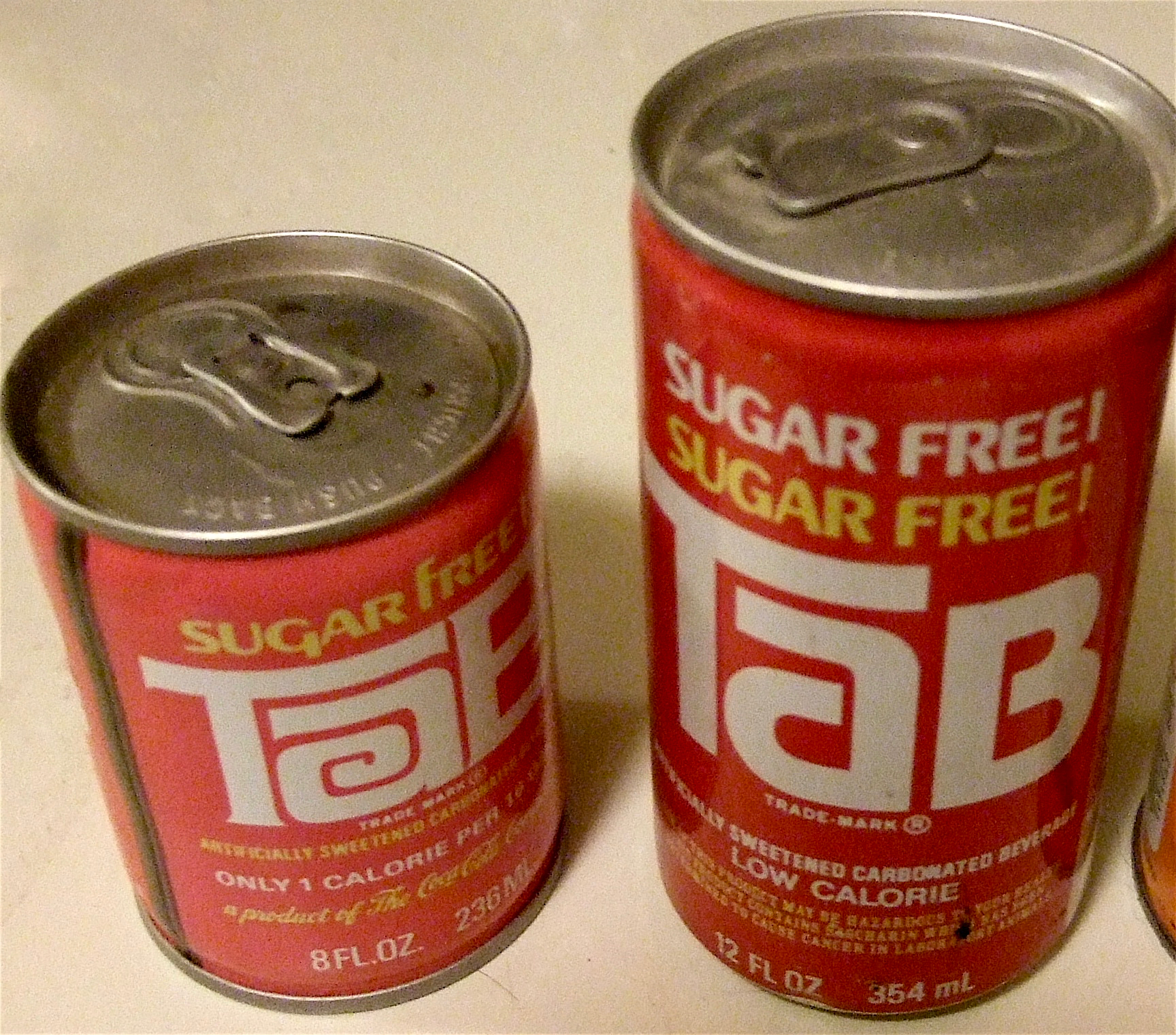
Early-1970s Tab can and a late-1970s can bearing the saccharin warning along the bottom

Tab was reformulated several times. It was initially sweetened with a mixture of cyclamate and saccharin. After the Food and Drug Administration (FDA) issued a ban on cyclamate in 1969, sodium saccharin was used as the beverage's primary sweetener.

Studies on laboratory rats during the early 1970s linked high volumes of cyclamate and saccharin with the development of bladder cancer. As a result, the United States Congress mandated that further studies of saccharin be performed and required that all food containing saccharin bear a label warning that the sweetener had been shown to cause cancer in laboratory animals. Despite this, Tab remained commercially successful and was the best-selling diet soda in 1982. In May 1984, Coca-Cola introduced Nutrasweet into the Tab formula, which alienated a significant portion of its market, and resulted in numerous consumer complaints regarding a perceived change in flavor.

In the absence of further evidence that saccharin caused cancer in humans, the substance was delisted in 2000 from the U.S. National Toxicology Program’s Report on Carcinogens; this led to the repealing of the warning label requirements for products containing saccharin. In December 2010, the United States Environmental Protection Agency removed saccharin from its list of hazardous substances.

== Availability ==
Tab's popularity began to decline in 1982 with the introduction of Diet Coke, although Tab retained something of a cult following in the United States, where customers purchased about 3 million cases in 2008. In 2011, the Coca-Cola Company reported that it produced approximately 3 million cases of Tab that year (in contrast to 885 million cases of Diet Coke). John Sicher, editor of Beverage Digest, commented in 2013:

[Tab] has pockets of popularity around the country. You see it on shelves in New York and a few other places. It certainly is not a brand you would find in most stores in the U.S. It has a small but devoted following. Coke is right to keep it available.

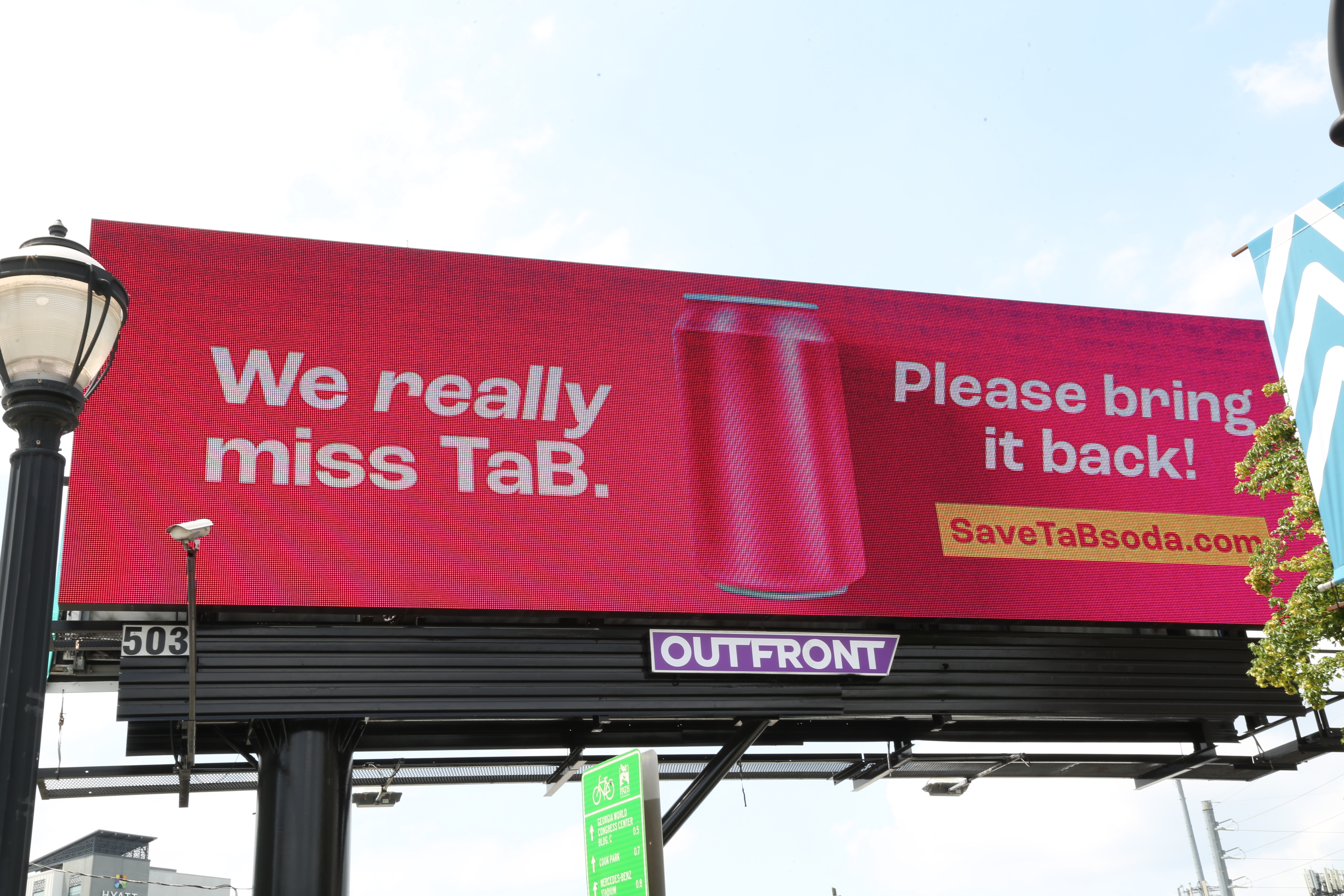
During Summer 2022, the Save Tab Soda Committee targeted the Coca-Cola company with several billboards to encourage Tab's revival.

The product was also available in the United States Virgin Islands, the Southern African Customs Union, Norway (under the name Tab X-Tra), Canada, and Spain. Tab was available in Australia in the 1960s to 1980s. It was also sold in the United Kingdom from the late 1970s to the mid 1990s.

As part of their efforts to scale back on under-performing brands during the COVID-19 pandemic, in October 2020, Coca-Cola announced that it was discontinuing Tab, along with Coca-Cola Life, Delaware Punch, Diet Coke Feisty Cherry, Northern Neck Ginger Ale, Diet Northern Neck Ginger Ale, Odwalla, and Zico.

As of June 2021, Tab was still available at Coca-Cola stores in Atlanta, Orlando, Las Vegas and select Georgia locations.

In 2021, a group of Tab soda fans created the Save Tab Soda Committee.

== Variants ==
| Name | Year launched | Notes | Picture | Ref. |
|---|---|---|---|---|
| Tab | 1963 | Original flavor. Sweetened with cyclamate-saccharin mixture upon release, but cyclamate was removed after 1969, and saccharin was the principal sweetener. In 1984, Nutrasweet was introduced to the formula. | | |
| Tab Strawberry | 1970s | Strawberry flavored diet soda; sold for a time in the 1970s alongside other diet drinks using the Tab name. | | |
| Tab Lemon-Lime | 1970s | Lemon-Lime flavored diet soda; sold for a time in the 1970s alongside other diet drinks using the Tab name. This is a predecessor to Sprite Zero, by which it likely was replaced. | | |
| Tab Black Cherry | 1970s | Black-Cherry flavored diet soda; sold for a time in the 1970s alongside other diet drinks using the Tab name. | | |
| Tab Root Beer | 1970s | Sugar-free root beer; sold for a time in the 1970s alongside other diet drinks using the Tab name. | | |
| Tab Ginger Ale | 1970s | Sugar-free ginger ale; sold for a time in the 1970s alongside other diet drinks using the Tab name. | | |
| Tab Orange | 1970s | Sugar-free orange soda; sold for a time in the 1970s alongside other diet drinks using the Tab name. This is a predecessor to Fanta Zero, which was launched in the early 2000s. | | |
| Tab Plus | 1977 | Tab Plus was a short-lived variant of Tab out of Canada that appeared in some northern US states. However, Tab Plus was made with sugar. It is assumed this was Coca-Cola's effort to bring a non-diet version of Tab into the normal soft drink market which did not succeed. | | |
| Caffeine Free Tab | 1983 | Original Tab flavor without the caffeine. It was sold during the 80s and vanished soon after. | | |
| Tab Clear | 1992 | Clear diet cola. Was first sold in the U.S. and later to Australia, the UK and Japan, and was discontinued within a year. | | |
| Tab (Southern African Customs Union variant) | 1990s | In these countries, Tab uses a different recipe compared to Spain and the U.S., where it is a caffeine-free drink, and uses less carbonation. The areas this can be found are Botswana, Lesotho, Namibia, South Africa and Eswatini. | | |
| Tab X-Tra | 1994 | A Norwegian version of Tab with a different name, made to compete with Pepsi Max in the country. It was also sold in Sweden and Finland, but the drink was discontinued in Sweden in 2007 and discontinued in Finland at an earlier date. After 2007, it was exclusively sold in Norway until it was discontinued in 2021. | | |
| Tab Energy | 2006 | A Tab-branded energy drink which uses an entirely different recipe from the cola. It was also sold in Mexico, New Zealand and Spain, where it is called Tab Fabulous. | | |
