= NOS (drink) =

Energy drink company

NOS Energy Drink

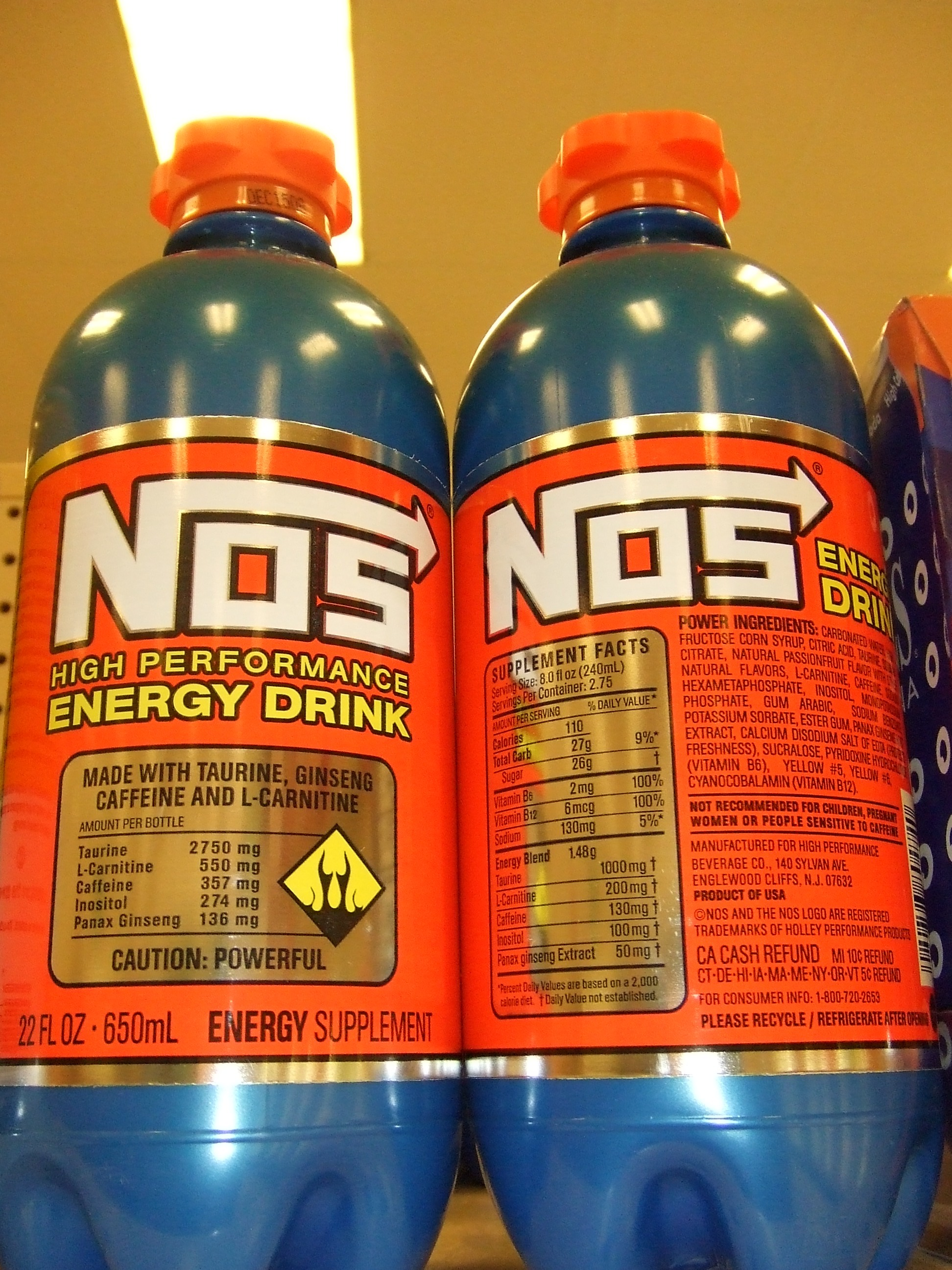
- Front and back labels
- Type: Energy drink
- Manufacturer: Monster Beverage
- Origin: United States
- Introduced: 2005; 21 years ago
- Variants: NOS Original; NOS GT Grape; NOS Sonic Sour; NOS Nitro Mango; NOS Zero Sugar; NOS Grand Prix Guava
- Website: drinknos.com

NOS is an energy drink sold in 16-and-24-US-fluid-ounce (470 and 710 mL) cans. The drink was also distributed in a bottle designed to look like a NOS (Nitrous Oxide Systems) tank but this bottle has been discontinued. Formerly a property of the Coca-Cola Company, it is currently produced by Monster Beverage and licensed by Holley Performance, which owns the trademark. NOS contains 160 mg of caffeine, with an unknown amount of taurine and guarana. L-Theanine was removed as a "CMPLX6" ingredient in 2016, with inositol becoming listed as one of the six featured ingredients on the can. NOS Energy is currently available in Original, Zero Sugar, GT Grape, and Grand Prix Guava.

== History ==
In February 2005, the Fuze Beverage company launched the beverage. The name "NOS" was licensed from Holley Performance Products, which manufactures the Nitrous Oxide Systems (NOS) brand of automotive nitrous injection systems. According to Holley, NOS is the first automotive product to have a consumable food product share its name and logo. In February 2007, Fuze was purchased by the Coca-Cola Company, which transferred the NOS licence to Coca-Cola. On June 12, 2015, Coca-Cola announced the transfer of its energy division, including NOS and Full Throttle, to Monster Beverage.

== Team NOS ==
NOS has been involved in various forms of motorsports as its main source of advertising. Team NOS currently consists of NASCAR Cup Series driver Ricky Stenhouse Jr., Formula Drift driver Chris Forsberg, World of Outlaws drivers Sheldon Haudenschild and Tyler Courtney along with Ultimate Drift Brasil driver Erick Medici and YouTuber TJ Hunt. They also are the title sponsor of the World of Outlaws Sprint Cars, known officially as the “World of Outlaws NOS Energy Drink Sprint Cars”. They are the title sponsor of the Knoxville Nationals.

NASCAR driver Kyle Busch and off-road driver Brian Deegan are former members of Team NOS. Busch became a NOS Energy driver in 2008 when he first joined Joe Gibbs Racing. He has raced the No. 18 NOS Energy Toyota Camry to victory lane a record number of times in the Xfinity Series, where he is the all-time leader in race wins, initially from 2008 until 2011, when he switched to then-rival Monster Energy in 2012.

Following Monster's acquisition of Coca-Cola's energy beverage products, and a corporate decision to realign the Busch Brothers, both of whom are affiliated with Monster Beverage, Kyle was aligned with NOS Energy in 2016. In the fall of 2016, Monster Beverage released its newest flavor "NOS Rowdy" which was inspired by Kyle Busch and his nickname "Rowdy". The sponsorship ended after the 2018 season. The sponsorship would be switched back to Monster Energy in 2019. Kyle Busch ultimately started his own energy drink and ended his sponsorship with Monster and NOS.

In 2019, NOS became the title sponsor of the World of Outlaws Sprint Car Series, replacing Craftsman Tools. NOS is also the primary sponsor of World of Outlaws NOS Energy Drink Sprint Cars Series driver, Sheldon Haudenschild.

== Ingredients ==
Ingredients are carbonated water, high fructose corn syrup, citric acid, sodium citrate, sodium hexametaphosphate (preservative), caffeine, taurine, natural flavors, acacia, potassium sorbate (preservative), glycerol ester of rosin, inositol, sucralose, yellow 5, calcium disodium edta (preservative), pyridoxine hydrochloride (vitamin B6), yellow 6, guarana, and cyanocobalamin (vitamin B12).
