= Bonaqua =

Bottled water brand sold in Hong Kong

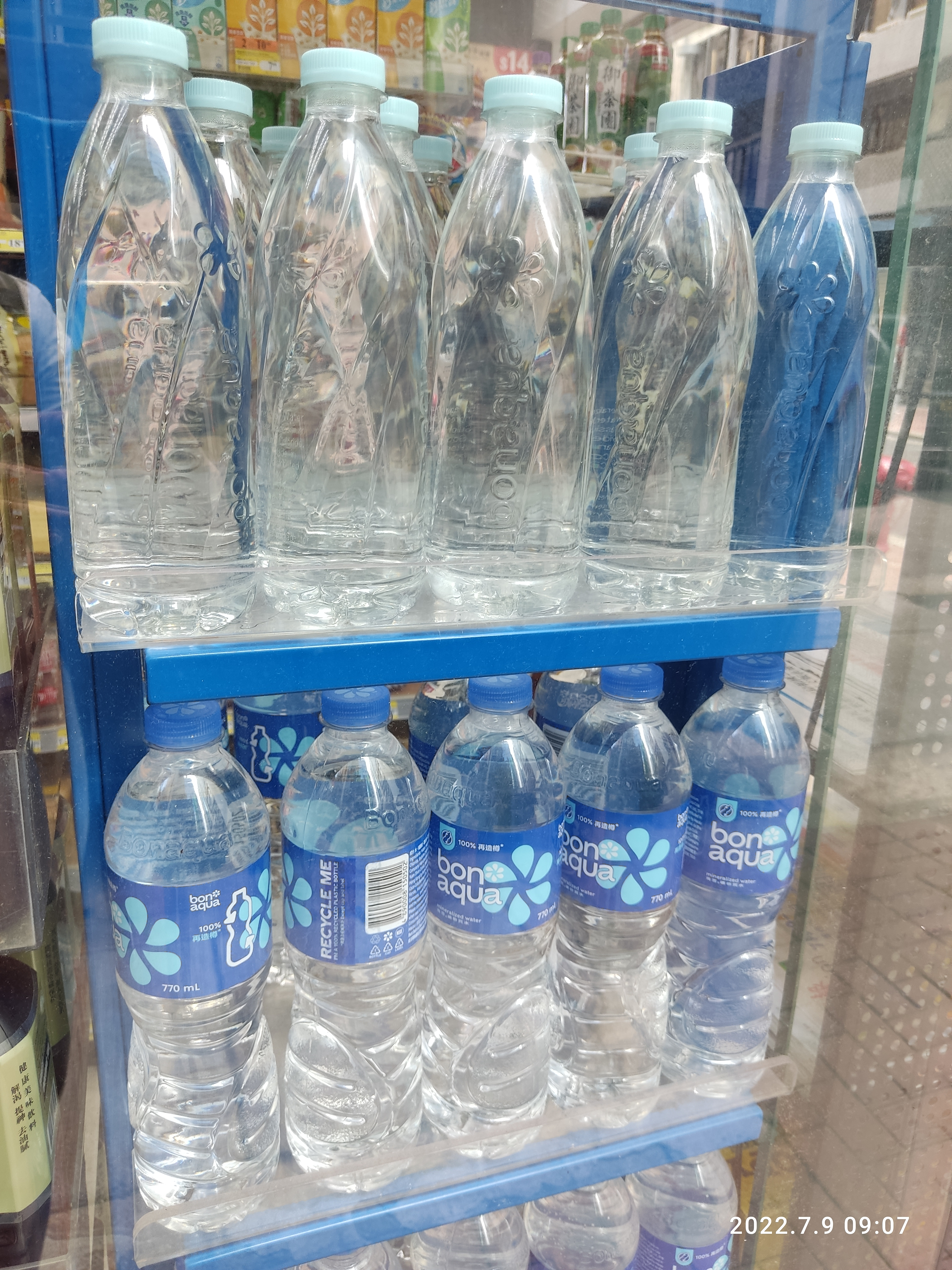
Bonaqua label-less bottle design (top) Bonaqua regular bottle design (bottom)

Bonaqua is a mineralized bottled water brand sold in Hong Kong and Mongolia owned by The Coca-Cola Company and Swire Coca-Cola HK. It is one of the many brands of Coca-Cola bottled water. The term "Bonaqua" stands for "Good water" in Latin ("bona aqua" is read "bonaqua" in Latin because of synaloepha or elision. The homepage states incorrectly that it comes from French, but "good water" in French is "bonne eau"). The product is filtered, mineralized and bottled.

== Water processing ==
=== Filtration ===
According to Swire Coca-Cola's own website, each bottle of “Bonaqua” undergoes a series of purification procedures with the water being filtered by a multi-barrier filtration system, reverse osmosis treatment and disinfection. The filtration process of Bonaqua's water is certified by the National Sanitation Foundation

=== Minerals ===
Minerals like magnesium sulphate, potassium chloride and sodium chloride are claimed to be added after the filtration process.

== Sustainability ==
=== Label-less Bottle ===
In 2021, "Bonaqua" released a new label-less version of bottled water which was sold in Hong Kong and later in Taiwan in mid-2022. aimed at being more environmentally-friendly. The new label-less design uses rPET rather than the conventional PET used in its regular version. The new label-less bottle design is also 52.8% lighter than the regular version.
