= Ameyal =

Mexican soft drink brand

Ameyal (from the Nahuatl word āmēyalli, meaning natural well or spring) is a brand of Mexican soft drink. It is also a brand of fruit sodas available only in Toluca, Cuernavaca, and Mexico D.F. Ameyal was formerly owned by Coordinación Industrial Mexicana (CIMSA), a Coca-Cola bottling company stationed in Toluca, Cuernavaca, and Mexico D.F. In 2008, Ameyal was acquired by The Coca-Cola Company. There was also a Club Soda version of Ameyal, but was acquired by Coca-Cola and renamed to Ciel Mineralizada.

In 2024, Mexico's Federal Consumer Protection Agency (Profeco) found the company's bottle labelling did not comply with government requirements. The following year, the regulator endorsed Ameyal's Strawberry Kiwi flavored drink after performing a quality test on soft drinks on the Mexican market.

A bottle of Ameyal Mandarin.

== Flavors ==
- Strawberry-Kiwifruit
- Pineapple
- Lemonade
- Sangria
- Tutti-frutti
- Mandarin
