= Full Throttle (drink) =

Energy drink brand

- We Live Full Throttle.
- Type: Energy drink
- Manufacturer: Monster Beverage
- Origin: United States
- Introduced: 2004; 22 years ago
- Related products: Mother, Monster Energy, NOS, Vault, Aspire Energy
- Website: www.drinkfullthrottle.com

Full Throttle is an energy drink brand produced by Monster Beverage. It debuted in late 2004 in the United States and Canada under their former owner The Coca-Cola Company. It also was known for its sponsorship of National Hot Rod Association competitions from the 2009 to 2012 seasons.

On June 12, 2015, Monster Beverage closed on the deal to acquire The Coca-Cola Company's energy drinks line. Coca-Cola transferred ownership of all of its worldwide energy businesses including NOS, Full Throttle and nine smaller brands to Monster. Monster transferred all of its non-energy drink businesses to Coca-Cola, including Hansen's natural sodas, Peace Tea, Hubert's Lemonade, and Hansen's juice products.

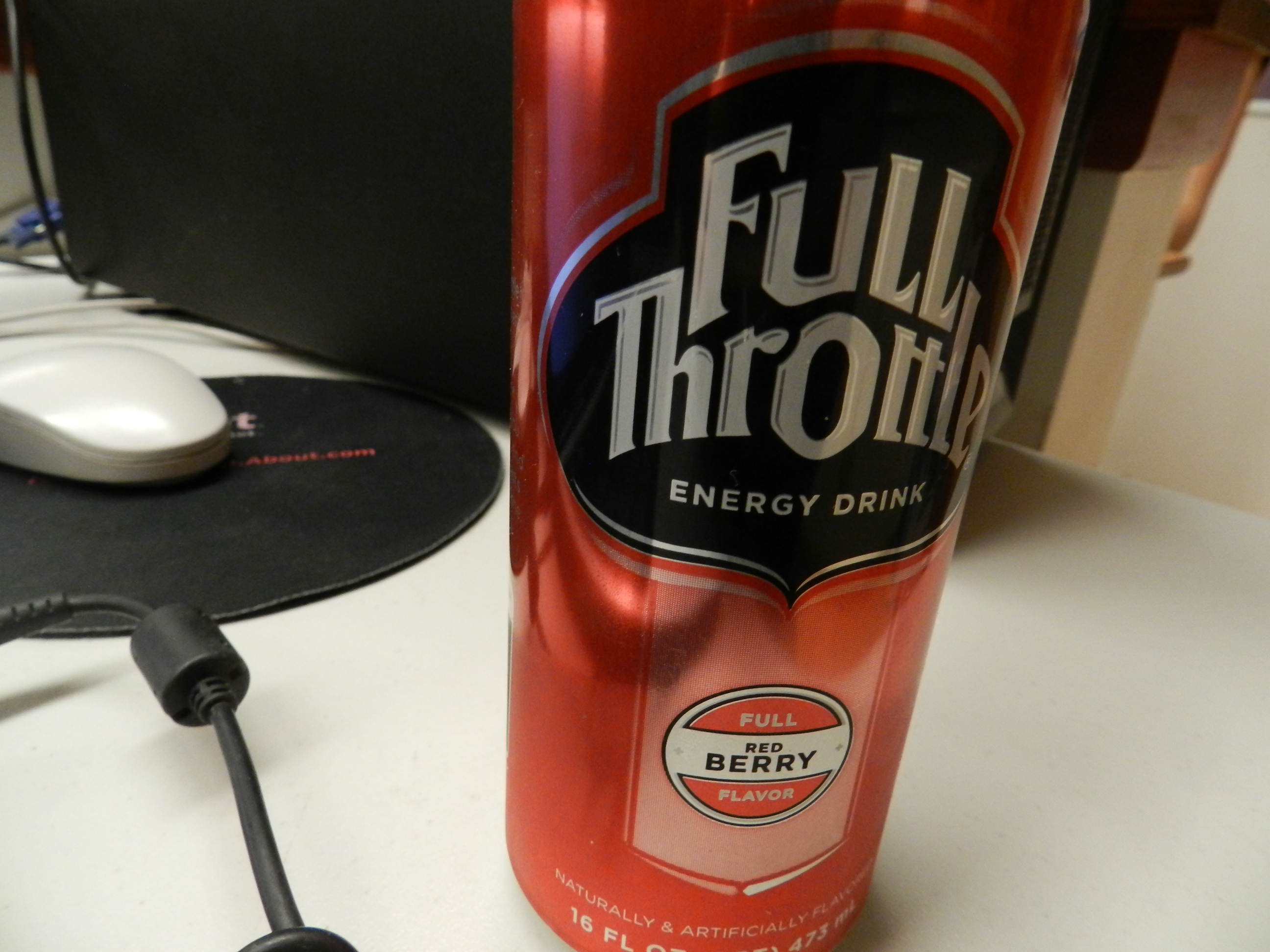
A red berry flavored Full Throttle drink

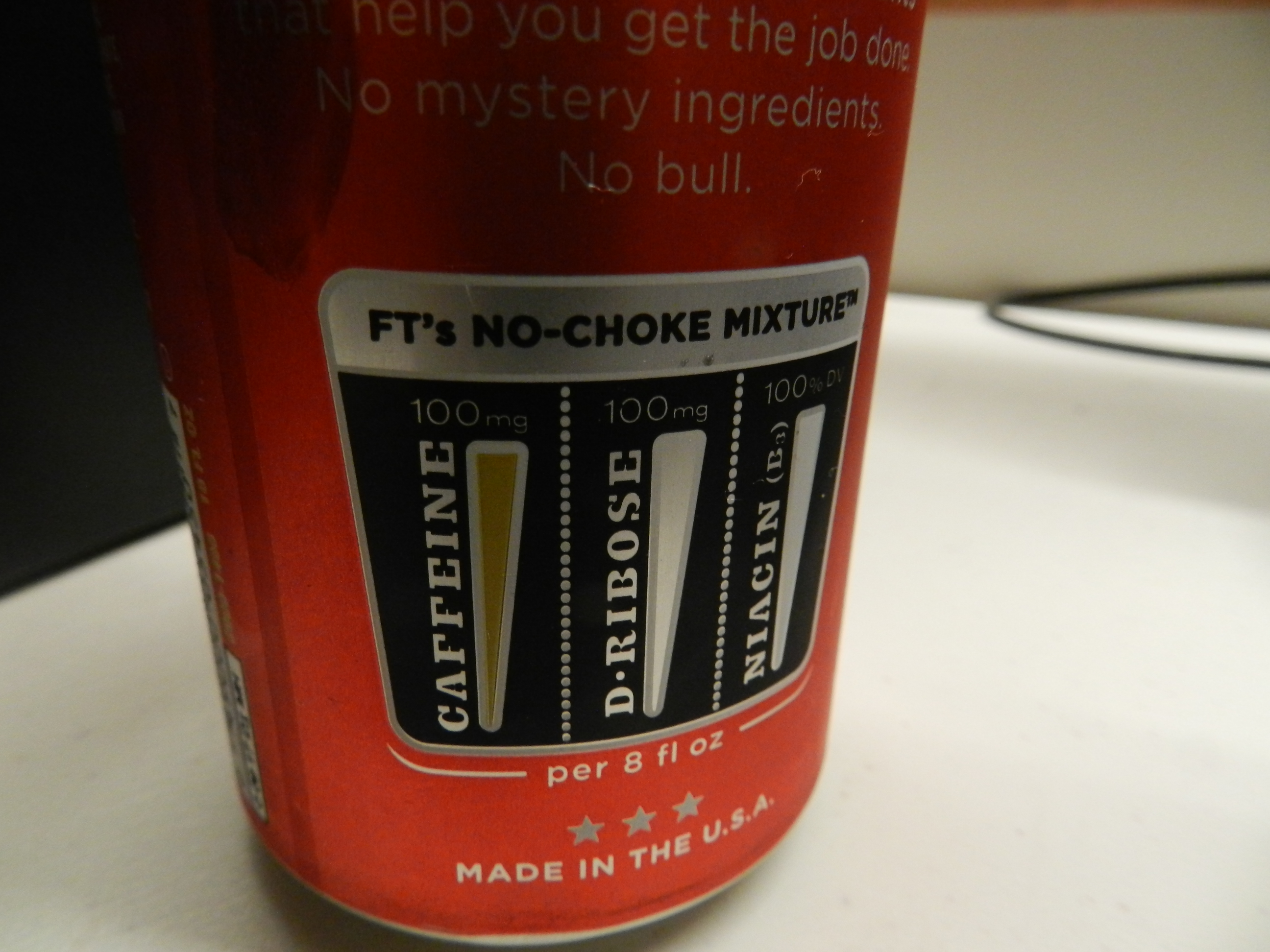
Full Throttle No-Choke Mixture

== Full Throttle Coffee ==
Previous logo

In 2008, Full Throttle released three coffee energy drinks of its own in the flavors Caramel, Vanilla, and Mocha in Southeast and Pacific Northwest markets. Coca-Cola claims it was made with "100% premium Arabica coffee", and it was available in 15oz cans, just like Monster's Java line and Rockstar's Roasted line. The drink's tagline was "Coffee. Fully Charged" prior to it being discontinued.

== Current drinks ==
- Full Throttle Red Apple
- Full Throttle Original Citrus

== Discontinued drinks ==
- Full Throttle True Blue
- Full Throttle Orange
- Full Throttle Blue Agave/Blue Demon
- Full Throttle Red Berry
- Full Throttle Original Citrus Sugar Free
- Full Throttle Night
- Full Throttle Fury Berry
- Full Throttle Fury Orange
- Full Throttle Fury Blue
- Full Throttle Fury Berry Sugar Free
- Full Throttle Mother
- Full Throttle Unleaded
- Full Throttle Hydration
- Full Throttle Coffee Vanilla
- Full Throttle Coffee Mocha
- Full Throttle Coffee Caramel
- Full Throttle Twisted (Fountain Exclusive)
- Full Throttle Tigerz
