= Red Flash =

American soft drink brand

Nutritional value per 100 g (3.5 oz)
- Energy: 25 kJ (6.0 kcal)
- Carbohydrates: 28 g
- Fat: 0 g
- Protein: 0 g
Vitamins and minerals
Minerals	Quantity %DV^{†}
Potassium	0% 12 mg
Sodium	1% 12 mg
- Other constituents: Quantity
- Caffeine: 27 mg
- ^{†}Percentages estimated using US recommendations for adults, except for potassium, which is estimated based on expert recommendation from the National Academies. Source: "the Coca-Cola Company" (PDF). Archived from the original (PDF) on 2007-09-28. (130 KB)

Red Flash is a soft drink sold by The Coca-Cola Company in the Southwestern United States. It is designed to compete against Big Red brand soft drink that is found in the same market. It was introduced in 2000.
