= Hawaï (drink) =

Moroccan soft drink

- Type: Soft drink
- Manufacturer: The Coca-Cola Company
- Origin: Morocco
- Introduced: 1991
- Color: Yellow-Orange
- Flavor: Tropical
- Variants: Can, plastic bottle, glass bottle

Hawaï is a tropical-flavored carbonated soft drink from Morocco, marketed by The Coca-Cola Company. It was first launched in 1991 by the Société Industrielle Marocaine (SIM), and later acquired by Coca-Cola in 1997.

== History ==
Hawaï was introduced to the Moroccan market in 1991 by SIM. In 1997, Coca-Cola acquired the brand, consolidating its position in the Moroccan soft drink market.

== Characteristics ==
The drink is known for its bright yellow color and tropical flavor, which combines fruits such as mango, pineapple, and passion fruit. The original formula has remained largely unchanged since its launch. In 2019, a pineapple variant was introduced.

== Distribution ==
While primarily distributed in Morocco, Hawaï has gained popularity among Moroccan diaspora communities in Europe, particularly France, Belgium, and Spain. Since the 2010s, it has become increasingly available in European supermarkets and in retail outlets such as halal butchers, corner shops, and fast food outlets.
