= Valpre =

Bottled spring water brand

Valpré
- Country: South Africa
- Source: Fricona Valley, Paulpietersburg, Northern KwaZulu-Natal, South Africa
- Type: Still water, sparkling water
- Calcium (Ca): 10
- Chloride (Cl): 2
- Fluoride (F): <0.1
- Magnesium (Mg): 10
- Potassium (K): 1.0
- Sulfate (SO_{4}): 4.0
- Website: Valpré Still Spring Water
- All concentrations in milligrams per liter (mg/L); pH without units

Valpré is a bottled spring water by The Coca-Cola Company available in South Africa. The brand is bottled in two forms, still and sparkling.

Coca-Cola South Africa announced on the 12 October 2009 that it will establish a new Valpre Water Bottling plant in Heidelberg, Gauteng.

It is claimed to be brought to the consumer just as they found it in the Fricona Valley, in the highlands of northern KwaZulu-Natal.
