= Far Coast =

Coffee brand

Far Coast is The Coca-Cola Company's entry into the specialty coffee, tea and premium roast & ground coffee category.

Coca-Cola officially launched the Far Coast brand in 2006 with the opening of four "concept stores" in Toronto, Oslo, Singapore, and Atlanta. The stores, which have subsequently closed, were used for the purpose of conducting market and consumer research before the brand was fully commercialized in the early part of 2008.

All Far Coast coffee blends are independently certified Fair Trade, Rainforest Alliance, or organic by the OCIA.

Recently Far Coast was featured as the Official Brewed Beverage of the Vancouver 2010 Winter Olympic Games. The brand's coffees, teas and cocoa were served at all Olympic venues, including the Vancouver and Whistler Athlete's Villages, where Far Coast displayed their locally designed outdoor tables and chairs made out of reclaimed pine destroyed by the Mountain Pine Beetle. During the Games, all Far Coast products were served in a 100% compostable cup, lid, and hot beverage sleeve - an Olympic Games first.

In Canada, Far Coast is served in a number of high traffic venues, including the CN Tower, Ontario Place, and nationwide at Cineplex Entertainment theatres.

Far Coast items are now on sale on spreadthered.ca and it appears the website has been removed indicating a possible discontinuation of the product line.

== See also ==
- List of coffeehouse chains
