= Delaware Punch =

Non-carbonated grape-flavored drink owned by The Coca-Cola Company

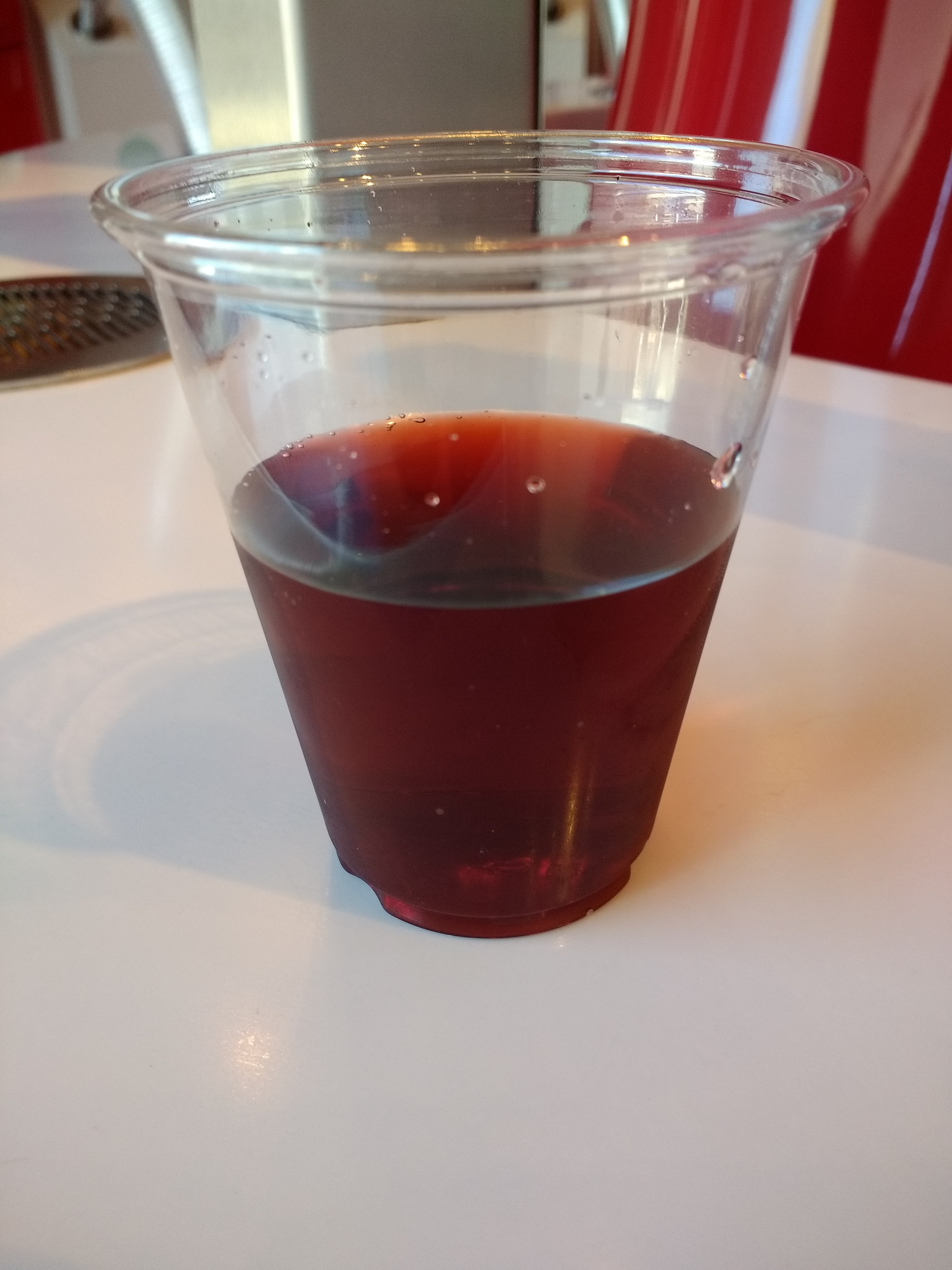
Delaware Punch

Delaware Punch is a fruit-flavored soft drink. Its formula used a blend of fruit flavors, with grape (Methyl anthranilate) being the most prominent. It was not carbonated and was caffeine-free.

Delaware Punch was created by Thomas E. Lyons in 1913. The brand was owned by The Coca-Cola Company, but has been discontinued since 2020 in the United States as a response to the COVID-19 pandemic.

Delaware Punch was named for the Delaware grape cultivar from which its flavor was derived. The grape was first grown in Delaware County, Ohio, and the drink therefore has no affiliation with the state of Delaware.

In October 2020, as part of their efforts to scale back on underperforming brands during the COVID-19 pandemic, The Coca-Cola Company announced the underperforming regional brands such as Tab, Northern Neck Ginger Ale, Coca-Cola Life, Diet Coke Feisty Cherry, Zico and Delaware Punch would all be discontinued by the end of 2020, in favor of focusing more on their popular brands.

Although originally discontinued, Delaware Punch is still available in the United States at World of Coca-Cola at Taste It!, a part of the attraction. It is still currently sold in Mexico and Guatemala.
