= Stoney (drink) =

African soft-drink beverage

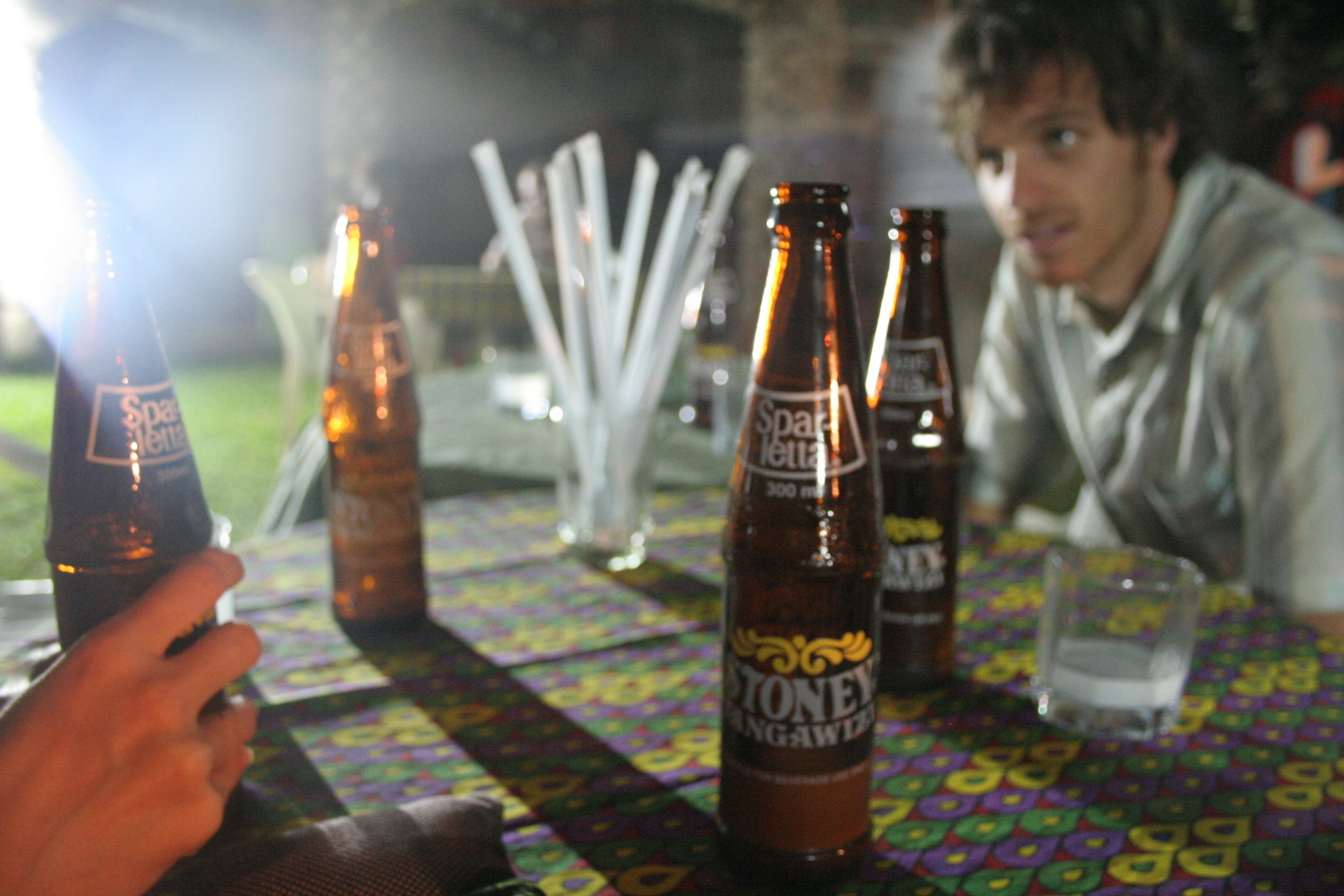
Stoney Tangawizi, consumed in the Eastern Democratic Republic of the Congo

Stoney Ginger Beer, or Stoney Tangawizi as it is called in Swahili-speaking Africa, is a ginger beer soft-drink sold in several countries across the African continent. The product, sold in a brown bottle or can, is made and distributed by The Coca-Cola Company.

As is common with ginger beers in comparison to the lighter ginger ales, the ginger flavour present in Stoney is especially intense. There are several varieties of Stoney in different parts of Africa. In South Africa there are four different stoneys; regular, sugar free, javaman and whankey/extra kwetsa. Although they are all bottled by Coca-Cola, their recipes vary: the versions in Southern Africa tend to be more carbonated and sweeter, while the East Africa version tends to have a much more intense ginger taste. Stoney Ginger Beer was introduced in South Africa in 1971.
