= Mare Rosso =

Non-alcoholic soft drink with a "Bitter Herb" flavor

Mare Rosso is made by The Coca-Cola Company in Spain. It is a non-alcoholic soft drink with a "Bitter Herb" flavor. It was developed as a competing drink to PepsiCo's Bitter Kas.
