= Ambasa =

Japanese soft drink

Ambasa アンバサ
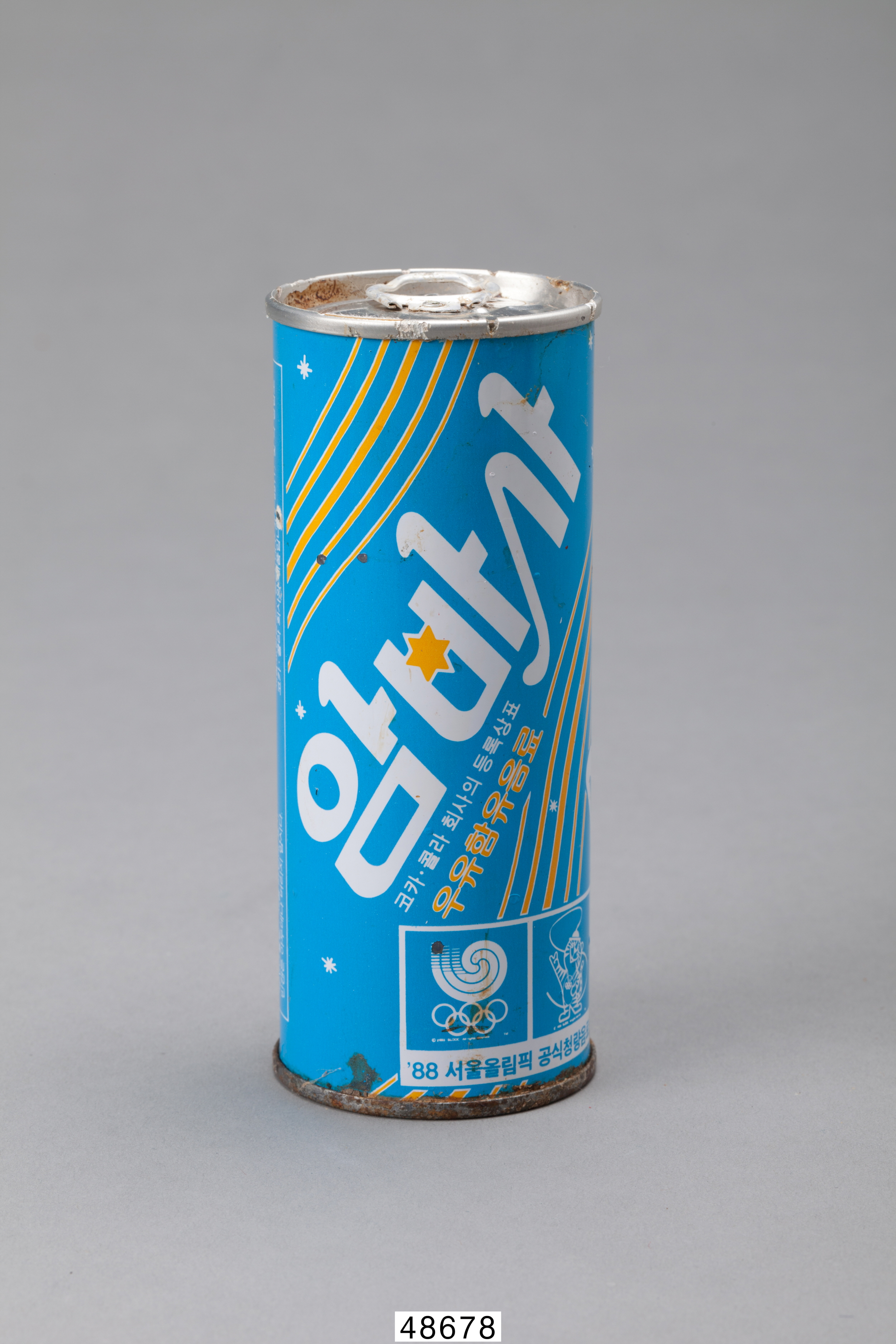
- Ambasa can in South Korea during 1980s
- Type: Milk-based soft drink
- Distributor: The Coca-Cola Company
- Origin: Japan
- Introduced: 1982
- Flavour: Varies

Ambasa (アンバサ) is a milk-based soft drink sold by the Coca-Cola Company. It was introduced in Japan 1982, and into South Korea in 1984. Variants of this drink, like non-carbonated or fruit (melon and strawberry) flavoured versions, are sold in Japan. The Korean version includes water, liquid fructose, sugar, skim milk powder, carbon dioxide, and citric acid.
