= Victoria (drink) =

Brand of fruit sodas produced by The Coca-Cola Company

Victoria is a brand of fruit sodas produced by The Coca-Cola Company. It is available only in the state of Querétaro, Mexico, and surrounding areas. Originally owned by the Grupo Fomento Queretano (FOQUE), a Coca-Cola bottling company in Querétaro, the Victoria brand was acquired by Coca-Cola in 2008.

== Flavors ==
- Apple
- Tamarind
- Currant
- Pineapple
- Lemon
- Mandarin
- Sangria
- Orange
