= Fruktime =

Russian soft drink brand

Fruktime is a series of the carbonated soft drinks which are sold in Russia, distributed by The Coca-Cola Company. It is made in various flavours: Buratino (caramel), Tarhun (tarragon), Hand bell (Bellflower), Lemonade, Pear, Strawberry, Apple, Cream soda, Kvass, and Baikal (Natural). The drink is no longer available in Ukraine.

It is issued in bottles PET in capacity 0.5, 1 and 2 liters.
