= Simba (soft drink) =

Branded citrus soft drink

- Type: Soft drink
- Manufacturer: The Coca-Cola Company
- Origin: United States
- Introduced: 1968
- Discontinued: 1972
- Flavor: Lemon citrus

Simba was a sugar-sweetened, lemon-flavored citrus "thirst-quenching" soft drink created by The Coca-Cola Company. The drink was named "Simba" (meaning "lion") in the Bantu language Swahili. The soft drink was heavily researched, test marketed in 1968, introduced nationally in 1969 but ultimately withdrawn in 1972 after sales did not reach expectations.

== Trademarks ==
According to the United States Patent Office, "Simba" was trademarked by The Coca-Cola Company on January 23, 1968, as a trade name for "soft drink syrup and beverage made therefrom". The trademark was renewed on September 10, 1988, but expired on May 16, 2009.

== "Thirst quenching" flavor profile ==
After more than a year of market research, the Coca-Cola Company determined there was a void in the kinds of soft drink beverages then available – the category did not have a formula that was "a pure thirst quencher". Simba was described by W. R. Windmiller, then president of the Pacific Coca-Cola Bottling Company as a "tart, lemon-flavored sugar based drink... not similar to any other soft drinks now on the market". He said Simba had been developed by "a special team of the Coca-Cola Company's flavor scientists".

=== Derived from Mountain Dew research ===
In 1979, Bob Kimball, Coca-Cola USA's marketing manager of new product development discussed how the formula for Simba stemmed from Coca-Cola's competitive market research of PepsiCo's Mountain Dew. The company developed three formulas that closely replicated Mountain Dew. One of the duplicative formulas was code-named "Jericho" by the company and, according to Kimball, was "the base for Simba, a drink Coca-Cola had marketed in the late 60s for a couple of years".

== Test marketing ==
Coca-Cola began limited test marketing of Simba in the Seattle-Tacoma, Washington, Louisville, Kentucky as well as the greater New York City markets in 1968 after more than a year of market research.

== Limited "national" introduction ==
In February 1969, Chicago newspapers reported that "a new soft drink called Simba from Coca-Cola" was on the way.

In April 1969, The Coca-Cola Company, Inc. announced it was "ready to market nationally its first new soft drink in three years", the citrus-flavored beverage Simba. Reporting "'encouraging' results rom test marketing in four large cities", the company said "it is making the product available immediately to its 975 bottlers in the U.S.".

During the August 1969 introduction in Oregon, Lawrence Baer described Simba in his weekly The Baer Facts column in the Salem Capital Journal newspaper, as "able to conquer all kinds of thirst, starting with the African thirst… a serious, personal affliction which demands special treatment... You’ll find it in the heat of Pittsburgh, the bustle of New York and the dusty playing field of Willamette University… The cool, clean tart taste of Simba is the cat’s meow when it comes to taming thirst, yet wild enough to mix well with all sorts of company".

However, a national rollout of Simba was not completed in 1969. In 1970, it was reported Simba was being introduced to the Kansas City, Manhattan and Sedalia, Kansas markets. In 1970, the Simba brand was assigned a new marketing director, Lowell W. Lehman, Jr by Coca-Cola USA.

In 1971, two years after the "national rollout of Simba" announced in 1969, markets such as Atchison – St. Joseph, Missouri were still being added.

== "African Thirst" marketing campaign ==
The Coca-Cola Company's Allied Products Group of Coca-Cola USA was assigned marketing responsibility for the promotion of Simba. The group selected New York City based Tinker Pritchard Wood Associates as the brand's advertising agency. Emery T. Smyth, the agency's president discussed the development of the brand's image, how the TV commercials were shot in Africa and how the brand marketing had been developed from research that found the "weak spot in the total (soft drink) market had been 'thirst'" at a 1968 American Association of Advertising Agencies conference. Actor Richard Boone was hired for the campaign's commercial voice-overs. Flown from his home in Hawaii to Hollywood to record the announce tracks, he was paid $75,000 (equivalent to $724,177 in 2025).

A marketing campaign was developed around the theme of Simba being able to quench the kind of extreme thirst experienced in Africa. The brand used a stylized male lion as the predominant visual element. The original "Simba" logo featured a stylized red sun in place of the dot in the lower case "i" in the yellow lettering of the word Simba.

=== Racially different versions of television commercials ===
External videos
- Two Simba commercials start at 2:13 in

The marketing campaign featured television commercials apparently designed with different racial appeal. At least two Simba soft drink commercials were created which only differed in the footage used at the end of each commercial. In one version, the commercial ended with a white hunter in the African bush drinking a bottle of Simba while the other version ending with footage showing a Black hunter in the African bush drinking a bottle of Simba. Both commercials were identical save for the different endings.

== Racial backlash ==
If Coca-Cola wanted the "African Thirst" campaign to appeal across racial lines, the plan did not succeed.

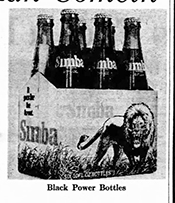
A 1969 newspaper photo showing a six-pack of bottled Simba soft drink with the caption "Black Power Bottles".

In 1969, in a nationally syndicated Newsday article that in some markets featured a sub-headline "Black Power", newspapers reported "From deep in the heart of Atlanta comes word that Coca-Cola, the biggest company in the South, is introducing something called 'Simba'". The article mentioned the slogan "It Conquers the African Thirst" and described how the TV commercials "featured footage of the dark continent's game preserves" and explained the marketing campaign was "Coke ...making a strong pitch to the newly discovered Afro-American consumer". The accompanying photo of the new six-pack of Simba soft drink bottles was sometimes captioned "Black Power Bottles".

In 1971, Asani Adeniyi Imam, a Fulbright scholar and Vice-Principal of the Advanced Teachers College Kano in Kano, Nigeria said Simba's marketing reinforced negative stereotypes of Africa in the United States and helped exacerbate frustrations felt by Black Americans in school as they looked within the culture for something with which they could identify. "...you hear about the sun beating down and the African thirst and how you can drink Simba and take care of all that... that presents a pretty negative image... A person with that kind of heritage can't have a positive image of himself".

A 1973 article in Franciscan Message magazine called out the Simba marketing campaign as being inherently racist, saying "A particularly ugly appeal is that based on racial differences. ...but it's Coca-Cola that gets the 'medal' for the most blatant appeal for the Negro trade. The firm originated and is marketing a special drink solely for the Negro trade. The drink is Simba... the name Simba was chosen deliberately".
