= Northern Neck Ginger Ale =

Ginger ale

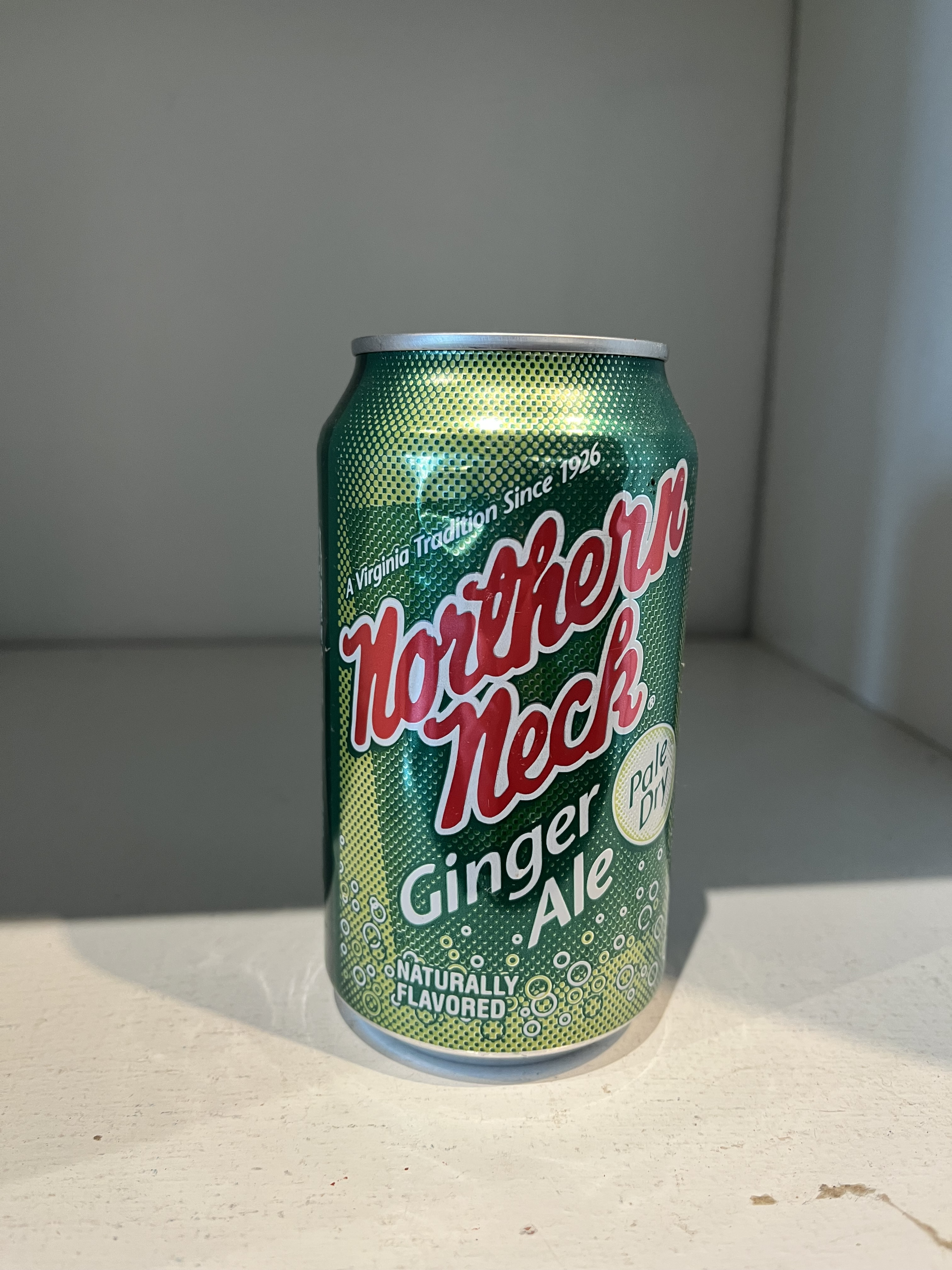
- Type: Ginger ale
- Manufacturer: Northern Neck Bottling Co. (until 2001); The Coca-Cola Company (2001–2020)
- Origin: United States, Montross, Virginia, U.S.
- Introduced: 1926; 100 years ago
- Discontinued: 2020; 6 years ago

Northern Neck Ginger Ale was a regional ginger ale sold in the Northern Neck region of Virginia for 94 years from 1926 until its discontinuation in 2020.

== History ==
Northern Neck Ginger Ale was created in 1926 by Arthur Carver in Montross, Virginia. The ginger ale was developed from a family recipe made during prohibition, and was originally sold as Carver's Ginger Ale. It was bottled in Montross until 2001 under Carver's company, Northern Neck Brewing Co., which also bottled Coca-Cola products under license. It was sold in the Northern Neck region and nearby areas such as Fredericksburg and Richmond. The recipe was sold to Coca-Cola in 2001, who then moved production to Sandston, Virginia. Production was discontinued in 2020 due to the COVID-19 pandemic.

In January 2019, a bill was sponsored by representative Margaret Ransone, whose district included several counties in the Northern Neck, to make it the official soft drink of Virginia. The bill followed a petition made in July 2018. The bill did not come to pass, however.

== Discontinuation ==
Following a shortage of aluminum cans due to the COVID-19 pandemic, Northern Neck Ginger Ale was discontinued by the end of 2020, along with other products such as TaB, Delaware Punch and Diet Coke Feisty Cherry. Due to the discontinuation of the soda, a non-profit group called the Northern Neck Foundation, along with a Facebook group and a petition, were started to convince Coca-Cola to bring it back. The group rented a billboard in Richmond. Several Virginia politicians, such as Tim Kaine, Ralph Northam, and Rob Wittman sent appeals to Coca-Cola to reinstate the brand. King George County, Westmoreland County, and Montross also adopted a resolution of support for reinstating the brand.
