= Amita (fruit juice) =

Brand of fruit juices

- Type: Fruit Juice
- Manufacturer: The Coca-Cola Company
- Origin: Greece
- Introduced: 1983; 43 years ago

Amita is a brand of fruit juices, nectars and drinks that is exclusive to Greece and Albania. It can be bought online for a significant up charge, a result of its costly shipping fees. Amita has been a subsidiary brand of Coca-Cola since its release in Greece in 1983. Amita is currently available in 13 flavors, those being Orange, Peace, Sour Cherry, Apple, Green Apple, Banana, Pineapple, Strawberry, Lemon, Pomegranate, Cranberry, Orange Apple and Apricot, Apple Orange and Carrot.
