= Santiba =

Line of soft drinks

Santiba was a line of soft drinks sold by The Coca-Cola Company in the United States. The flavors sold include ginger ale, club soda, quinine water and a citrus soda. It was introduced in 1969. It is no longer produced. The trademark for Santiba was issued to Coca-Cola in 1969 and has expired as of 1992.
