= Grupo Tampico =

- Type: Private
- Industry: Automotive, Plastics, Services, Soft drinks and Tourism
- Founded: 1912; 114 years ago
- Founder: Leo Fleishman
- Headquarters: Tampico, Tamaulipas, Mexico
- Key people: Herman H. Fleishman (President); Robert A. Fleishman (Vice President & CEO)
- Products: Coca-Cola, Escuis, Ciel, Megamotors, Plásticos Panamericanos, etc.
- Website: www.gtglobal.com

GT Global (formerly Grupo Tampico) is one of the largest companies in northeastern Mexico. It is located in Tampico, Tamaulipas. GT Global's main products are finance, automobiles, plastics and tourism services.

== History ==
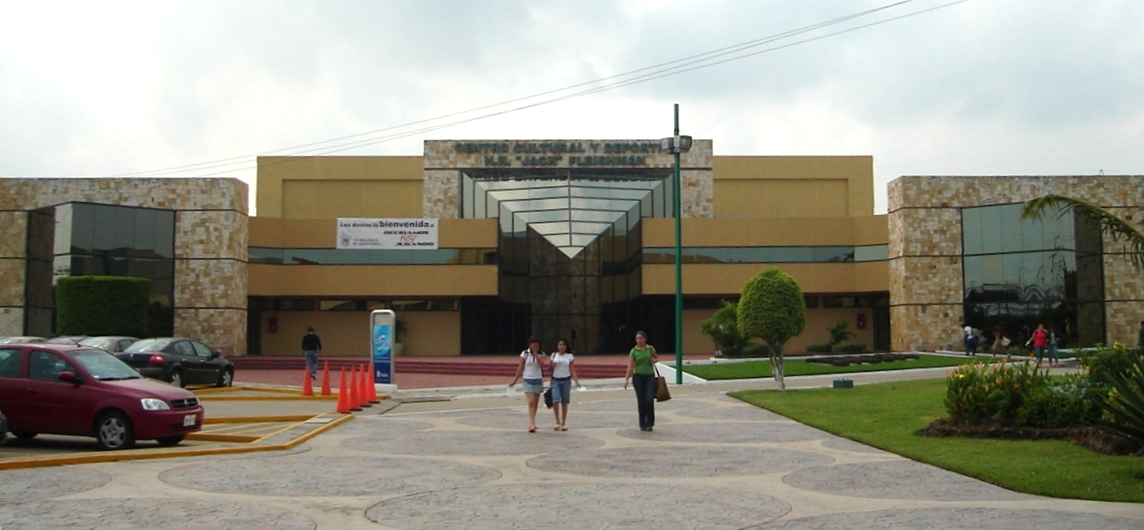
The H. H. "Jack" Fleishman Cultural Center at ITESM Campus Tampico, is named for the third owner of Grupo Tampico

GT Global (formerly Grupo Tampico) began in 1912 as "La Pureza", a soft drink company, under the leadership of Leo Fleishman. His son H. H. Fleishman led the development of the second-generation companies of the group. He also negotiated with The Coca-Cola Company so that, in 1926, Tampico became the first city in Mexico to bottle Coca-Cola.

His son, H. H. "Jack" Fleishman, later continued with the growth and diversification of the third-generation companies of Grupo Tampico. Today, Herman H. Fleishman, a son of H. H. "Jack", is the president and CEO of GT Global while his brother, Robert A. Fleishman is vice president and chief operating officer.

GT Global is today, with its leading brands of products and services, one of the most important business organizations in northeastern Mexico, with a presence in the states of Tamaulipas, Veracruz, San Luis Potosí, Jalisco, Nuevo León, Coahuila and the State of Mexico.

In 2006 GT Global opened a new Coca-Cola bottling plant in Altamira, named La Pureza after the original name of GT Global which Leo Fleishman founded in 1912.

On 29 June 2011, was announced that FEMSA will merge to the bottling division of Grupo Tampico, agreeing to pay $9.3 billion pesos ($790 million dollars) in stock for the Coca-Cola bottling operations of Grupo Tampico.

== Divisions of GT Global ==
=== Automotive ===
- Megamotors Tampico (Chrysler, Dodge, Jeep and Ram)
- Megamotors Madero (Chrysler, Dodge, Jeep and Ram)
- Mercedes-Benz Tampico
- Mitsubishi Motors
- Toyota
- Megamotors Trucks (Mercedes-Benz)
- Mazda

=== Tourism ===
- Camino Real
- Mansión Real
- Interviajes
- Thrifty Tampico

=== Plastics ===
- Plásticos Panamericanos
- GT Plastics norte

=== Services ===
- Club de Industriales
- Águila Seguridad
- Almacenes Miramar
- Aerotaxi

=== Finance ===
- GT Credit

=== Real Estate ===
- Altama
