= Frutonic =

Carbonated fruit juice drink

Frutonic is a lightly carbonated soft drink made of juice and water by The Coca-Cola Company. It is sold in Belgium, Luxembourg, and New Zealand. Flavors include lemon, orange and strawberry.
