= Quwat Jabal =

Soft drink

Quwat Jabal (Arabic: قوة جبل) is a citrus-flavored carbonated soft drink sold in the Middle East. It is produced by Coca-Cola.

It is lemon-lime flavored, made with real lemon and lime juice. Caffeine content is 14.5 mg per 100mL, or about 51.5mg per 12oz (355mL).
