= Tiky =

Pineapple-flavored soft drink

Tiky is a pineapple-flavored soft drink distributed by Fabrica de Bebidas Gaseosas Salvavidas, S.A. in Guatemala.
