= Gladiator (energy drink) =

Lucha libre-themed line of energy drinks

Gladiator Energy Drink is a lucha libre-themed line of energy drink sodas first released in México in 2008 by The Coca-Cola Company. This product is endorsed by lucha libre stars of Consejo Mundial de Lucha Libre like Místico, Perro Aguayo, Jr., Último Guerrero and Dr. Wagner, Jr. In July of the same year, Gladiator Energy Drink is released in Dominican Republic and in 2009 is released in Brazil.

This sparkling drink was first introduced in Ukraine in 2009; One year after, the production line for Gladiator added the 0,5-litre PET bottle.

== Flavors ==
- Fruits
- Red Citrus
- Citrus Punch (only in Mexico)
