= Fuze Beverage =

Drink manufacturer

- Type: Subsidiary
- Industry: Beverage
- Founded: 2000
- Founder: Lance Collins
- Headquarters: Englewood Cliffs, New Jersey, United States
- Products: Alternative beverages
- Number of employees: 1500 (2020)
- Parent: The Coca-Cola Company
- Website: www.fuzebev.com

Fuze Beverage (/fjuːz/ fyooz), commercially referred to as simply Fuze (marketed in Greece, Switzerland, Turkey, Georgia, Kazakhstan and Kyrgyzstan as Fuse; formerly in Malaysia and Singapore as Heaven and Earth and in Indonesia as Frestea), is a manufacturer of teas and non-carbonated fruit drinks enriched with vitamins. Currently, the brand consists of five vitamin-infused lines: Slenderize, Refresh, Tea, Defensify, and Vitalize. The use of vitamins, amino acids, and herbs, and alternative sweeteners such as crystalline fructose places Fuze products in what is known in the industry as the new age beverage category.

== History ==
Fuze Beverage was founded by Lance Collins and creative director Paula Grant in the basement of Collins' Englewood Cliffs, New Jersey home in 2000. Bruce Lewin obtained funding for the fledgling company in 2001. He subsequently joined Fuze's board and became a major shareholder. Joe Rosamilia was also one of the founding investor/directors.

The brand was launched, first in the Northern California market in 2001 with three flavors packaged in fruit-themed bottles: mixed berry, banana colada and cranberry raspberry. In 2002 the brand launched two additional flavors, peach mango and tropical punch; the same year, the company grew to 30 employees and moved out of Collins' basement.

The company continued to expand rapidly, launching new flavors throughout 2004 and 2005. Since 2005, Fuze products may be found in most major retailers, with sales exceeding 11 million cases by 2006.

The company's growth attracted the attention of The Coca-Cola Company, which purchased Fuze Beverage in February 2007 for an estimated $250 million. Coke also gained the rights to NOS Energy Drinks and WaterPlus as part of the purchase. It was one of Coke's largest acquisitions since it bought Odwalla Inc. for $186 million in 2001. The move was seen as a strategic effort to expand the company's portfolio of non-carbonated beverages, and specifically to compete with PepsiCo's SoBe line of fruit juice blends and enhanced waters. It also confirmed a strategy shift from Coke's long-time practice of developing new products in house in favor of buying innovative beverage companies. Fuze launched over 40 new products and line extensions since its inception. Coke named Carl Sweat, previously senior vice president of sales and marketing of its retail division, as president and general manager to lead Fuze as a separate entity. Company founder Lance Collins was named head of innovation and strategy.

With Coke's distribution system and relationships, sales more than doubled from 2007 to 2008. In 2009, Fuze entered into an agreement to sell its products fountain-style in over 22,000 Subway sandwich shops. Sweat departed the company in 2009 for a post in the global beverage unit at Starbucks

== False marketing of Fuze ==
Fuze beverages are marketed as natural health products and are fortified with a variety of vitamins, antioxidants and electrolytes, which are widely considered to be a factor in the maintenance of good health. Fuze beverages are labelled as Enhanced Real Fruit Beverage(s) and contain a mix of concentrated fruit juices and fruit purees in addition to other ingredients. However, the exact amount of fruit juices per 547ml bottle is unclear due to the product label, which presents medicinal and non-medicinal ingredients in separate lists; this information is also absent from the Fuze product website. It has been estimated that Fuze beverages contain between 1.0% and 5.0% actual fruit content.

Fuze's Slenderize line of products has the widest selection of flavors, and it is implied that these products will assist in weight loss either by satisfying a dieter's cravings for sweets or by incorporating the drink into a more filling smoothie mix using fresh fruit and yogurt. However, to date there is no scientific evidence to support these claims or other previous assertions that Fuze products may help consumers avoid cancer, heart disease, colds, flu and infections of the lungs and kidneys.

== Ingredients ==
Some Fuze products, such as Fuze Iced Tea, are sweetened with HFCS and sucralose, an artificial sweetener.

== Fuze Iced Tea in Canada ==
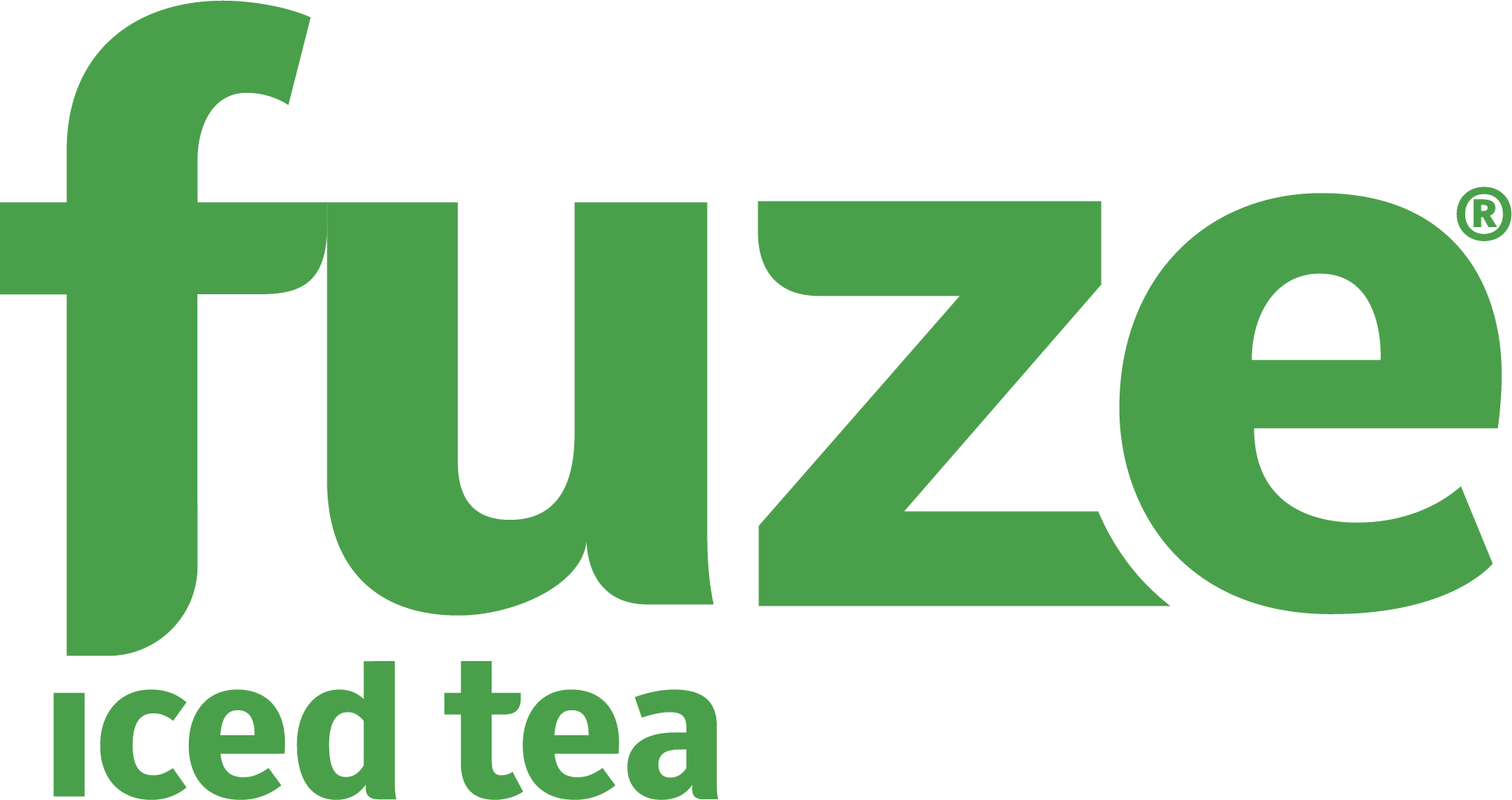
Logo for Fuze Iced Tea in Canada

In January 2025, Coca-Cola lost the rights to produce iced tea under the Nestea brand in multiple markets following the expiration of its remaining licensing agreements with Nestlé, the company would enter into a new licensing agreement with Keurig Dr Pepper Canada for the Canadian market. Coca-Cola subsequently rebranded Nestea in Canada as Fuze, as it still held the rights to the formulas it used when producing Nestea-branded beverages.
