= Tab Energy =

Energy drink

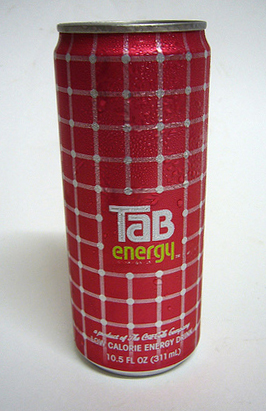
- Type: Energy drink
- Manufacturer: The Coca-Cola Company
- Origin: USA
- Introduced: February 2006; 20 years ago
- Website: www.tabenergy.com/index.jsp

Tab Energy is a discontinued low calorie energy drink created by The Coca-Cola Company. The beverage is unique as it is sweetened with sucralose (rather than saccharin), it has a translucent pink color, and is lightly carbonated.

It is packed in 10.5-US-fluid-ounce (311 ml) slim cans (with a shape similar to the can used for Red Bull). The New Yorker notes that the original Tab has 31 milligrams of caffeine and less than 1 calorie (4.2 kJ) per serving, while Tab Energy has 95 milligrams of caffeine and 5 calories (21 kJ). (It also contains 785 mg taurine, 116 mg ginseng extract, 19 mg carnitine, and 0.90 mg guarana extract, according to the can.)

The drink was targeted and advertised towards a female market as illustrated by the pink color theme and slogan 'Fuel to be Fabulous'. The song used in the American version of the commercial is "Cobrastyle" by the Teddybears.

Tab Energy is also available in Mexico since December 2006, in New Zealand since February 26, 2007, and in Spain since September 2008 under the name Tab Fabulous. This drink has been discontinued by Coca-Cola.

== Ingredients ==
Ingredients are carbonated water, citric acid, taurine, natural and artificial flavors, sodium citrate, sodium benzoate, ginseng extract, caffeine, vegetable juice, acesulfame potassium, sucralose, carnitine fumarate, niacinamide (Vitamin B_{3}), pyridoxine hydrochloride (Vitamin B_{6}), Guarana extract, and cyanocobalamin (Vitamin B_{12}).

== Ad campaign ==
The Tab energy drink campaign was driven by Hollywood Lifestyle. The product launch was on Feb. 2, 2006 with a premiere party during New York Fashion Week ‘06. Their ad campaign slogan is "Tab Energy... Fuel To Be Fabulous". The original broadcast of the Tab Energy commercial aired during the Oscar telecast in 2006. The commercial featured well dressed, attractive women, who could very well be Hollywood stars, and their daily activities, including shopping for extravagant clothing, driving expensive cars, dining at exclusive restaurants, and dating exceedingly handsome gentlemen.

The official website for the drink had various features, including links to photos of Tab launch parties at exclusive venues.

FoxNews.com published an article called "Pink Power: Tab Is Back, Sort Of" that mentions how Tab is the new favorite energy drink of Hollywood stars. There are even people quoted within the article that mention how "Nicole Richie and Fergie (from The Black Eyed Peas) were seen guzzling Tab Energy drink all over Manhattan… and when these two put their stamp of approval on a product, expect other celebrities to follow suit" and that ""[t]he design is great and it is a much prettier can to be caught by the paparazzi drinking — and the pink design makes it almost like an accessory."
