= Mother (drink) =

Energy drink

- Type: Energy drink
- Manufacturer: Monster Beverage Corporation
- Origin: Australia
- Introduced: 2006
- Variants: Original, Tropical Blast, Passion, Kicked Apple (NZ only), Frosty Berry, Kiwi Sublime (now discountinued), Epic Swell (now discontinued), Sugar Free (AU only), Razzle Berry, Lava Guava, Rainbow Sherbet, Orange Dreamsicle, Watermelon, White Gummy, Sour Snakes.
- Website: www.motherenergydrink.com

Mother is an energy drink that originated in Australia and New Zealand by Coca-Cola. Introduced in late 2006 after Coca-Cola's failed attempt to purchase Red Bull, it competes with the two leading energy drinks on the market, V and Red Bull, in the $151 million industry.

== Original version ==
The original Mother formula was a natural-based formula in response to consumers' health demands. It had a poor reception due to its unfavourable taste. The original formulation contained 106 mg of caffeine, 33 g of sugar, fruit of the açaí palm, 68% apple juice, 5% lemon juice, carbonated water, fructose and malt extract and trace quantities of guarana and ginseng, per 250 mL can.

== Reformulation and relaunch ==
Coca-Cola announced the reformulation and relaunch of Mother in June 2008 after 18 months on the market. Changes announced include a new taste ("extensively researched with consumers"), a larger 500 mL can, and a change of packaging colour from aluminium to black and red, the colour of the drink from yellow to green, along with a A$3 million marketing campaign. The primary focus of both the campaign and the new packaging is the reformulated taste of the drink, proclaimed on the packaging as 'New - tastes nothing like the old one!'.

Since then Coca-Cola has launched a 4x500 mL Mother take-home pack. Mother Surge was launched in July 2009, an orange flavoured variation with 5% juice and the same mix of Taurine, Caffeine and Guarana. Mother was launched into a 355 mL glass bottle in August 2009. And most recently a 'Mother of a mixer' 250 mL can was launched for bars/clubs in October 2009 followed by convenience stores in April 2010. In 2010 330 mL cans are stocked in some vending machines alongside other Coke Brands. In May 2010, a 150 mL variety, 'Mother Big Shot' was released, containing "double guarana and taurine... vs Mother regular per 100mL" according to the can. From November 2010, Mother released both a Low Carb and Lemon Bite variety of the drink. In July 2012, a sugarfree version was released (with a silver can instead of the black).

Recently, Coca-Cola launched a new Mother energy drink variant to the market, featuring "Fuel Cap Bottle". This drink is similar to the new Mother taste and boasts Mother's "8 energy ingredients" as the main push.

In March 2017 Mother Energy rebranded their logo and packaging designs, as well as introduced the Kicked Apple flavour.

== Nutritional information (reformulated) ==
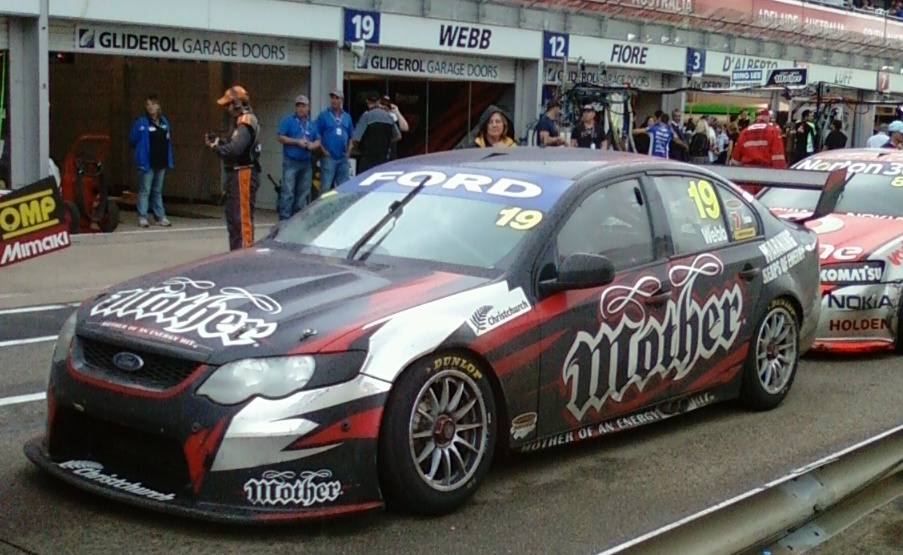
Ford FG Falcon of Jonathon Webb

Average quantities per 500 mL serving:

- Energy: 952 kJ (228 cal)
- Protein: 0 g
- Fat, total: 0 g
  - Saturated: 0 g
- Carbohydrates: 51 g
  - Sugars: 51 g
- Sodium: 240 mg
- Caffeine: 160 mg (guarana extract)
- Niacin (B_{3}): 9.0 mg
- Pantothenic acid (B_{5}): 3.3 mg
- Vitamin B_{6}: 1.0 mg
- Vitamin B_{12}: 0.5 μg
- Taurine: 2000 mg
- Glucuronolactone: 600 mg
- Inositol: 60 mg
