= Nalu (drink) =

Energy drink

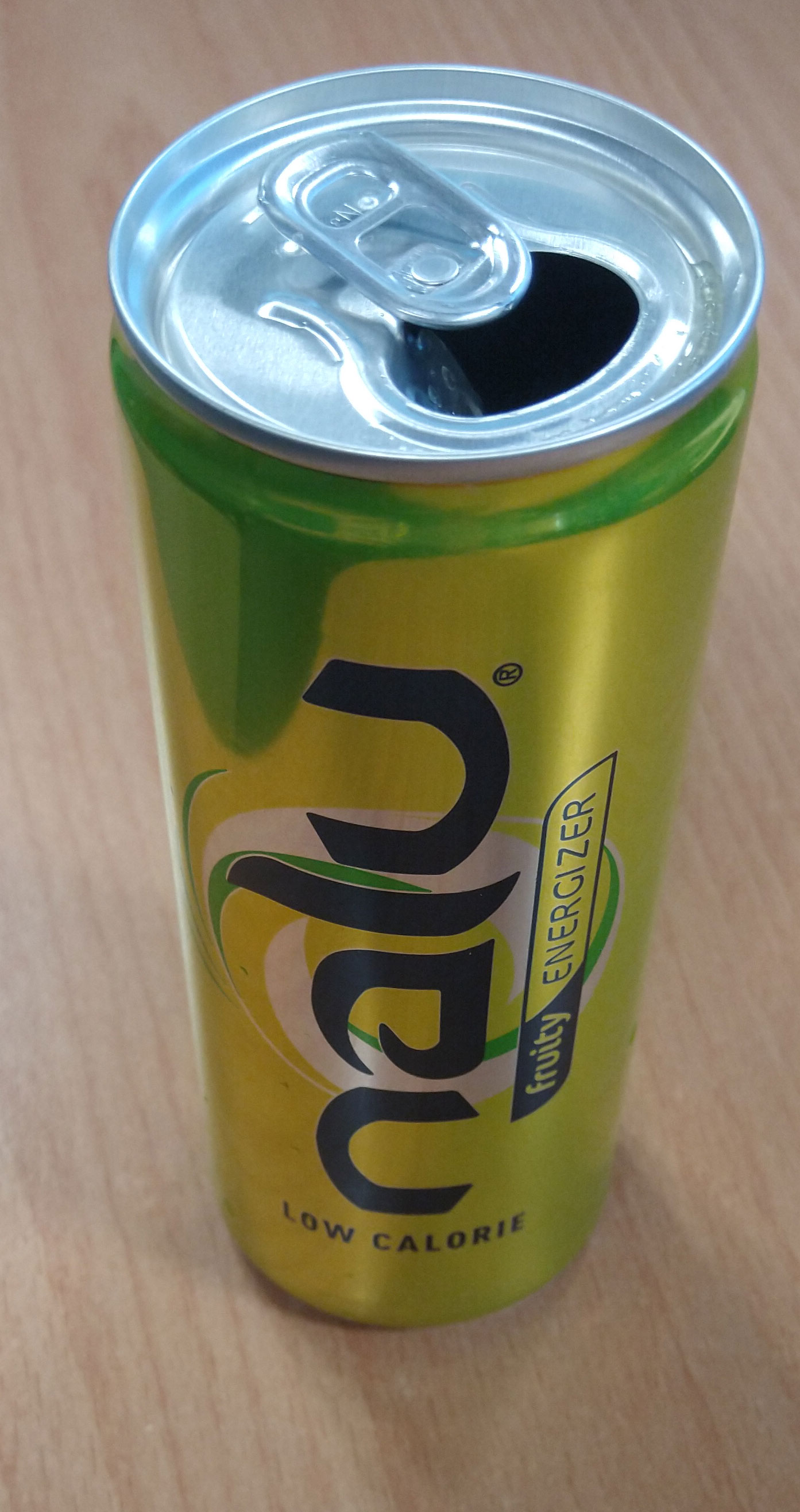
This is the "Original" flavour of the energy drink Nalu. Before the can there was a bottle version.

Nalu is an energy drink produced by The Coca-Cola Company, sold in the Benelux. The drink was launched in 2002. Its name stems from the Hawaiian word nalu, meaning wave or surf; the surf theme is maintained in the branding of the drink.

== Flavours and Variants ==
The three versions of Nalu and their flavors are:

- Fruity Energizer:
  - Original
  - Frost
  - Exotic
  - Passion
  - Melon Splash
  - Zero Sugar Original
- Tea Energizer:
  - Black Tea & Passionfruit
  - Green Tea & Ginger
  - Rooibos Tea & Hibiscus
- Botanical Energizer:
  - Blackcurrant & Lavender
  - Strawberry & Rhubarb
  - Yuzu & Rosemary

== Composition ==
Nalu drinks typically contain:

- Carbonated water
- Fruit juice from concentrate (orange, kiwi, mango, passionfruit, ...)
- Sugar and/or artificial sweeteners
- Caffeine
- B vitamins such as niacin (B3) and cobalamin (B12)
