= Ciel (drink) =

Brand of bottled water

- Type: Bottled water
- Manufacturer: Coca-Cola México
- Available: Mexico
- Website: www.coca-colamexico.com.mx

Ciel is a brand of bottled water owned by The Coca-Cola Company which is bottled and sold in Mexico, Angola, and Morocco. As of 2015, it held a 19.4% share of the bottled water market in Mexico. Bottled water brands owned by The Coca-Cola Company in multiple countries use the Ciel branding.

== History ==
Cola Cola Mexico introduced Ciel in 1996 in the states of Aguascalientes, Jalisco, Zacatecas, Durango, San Luis Potosi and Coahuila. In 1997, Ciel was released in Mexico City, and in 2001 was released in the states of Nuevo Leon and part of Tamaulipas. In that same year, The Coca-Cola Company released a mineral water version called Ciel Mineralizada in several markets.

In 2002, along with the acquisition of Panamerican Beverages (Panamco) made by Coca-Cola FEMSA, The Coca-Cola Company acquired Panamco's bottled water brand Risco, and converted it into Ciel, so the brand started being available in the states of Guanajuato, Puebla, Veracruz and Michoacán.

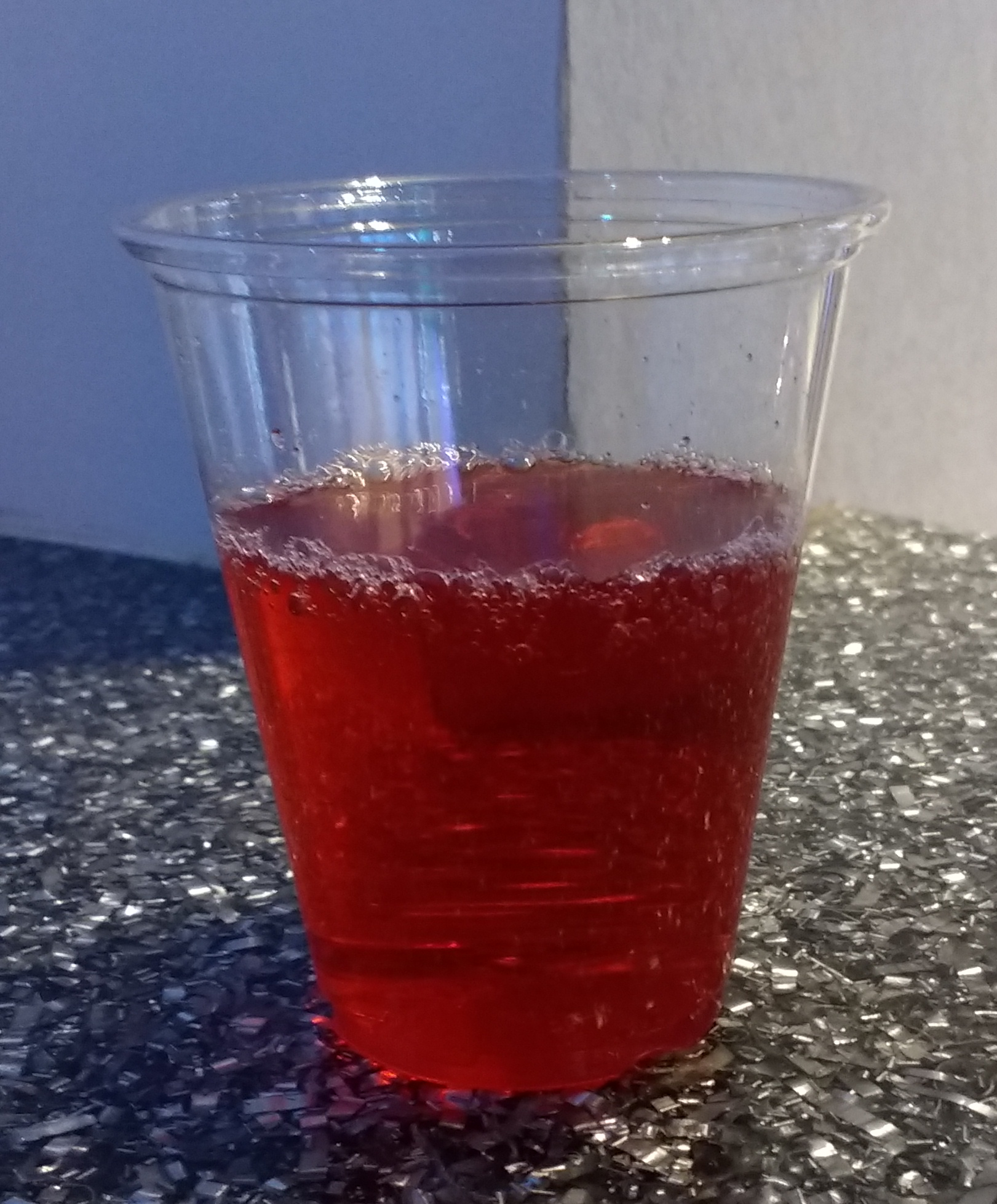
Ciel Aquarius

In 2005 Coca-Cola released a calorie-free flavored water version of Ciel called Ciel Aquarius (renamed Ciel+ in 2008). In that same year, Ciel Dasani was released, a functional water with skin nutrients and fiber available in four flavors: lemon-cucumber, papaya-carrot, grapefruit and mandarin-green tea; a year later, this product was discontinued.

In 2006 The Coca-Cola Company released Ciel Naturae, a line of sparkling flavored water available in three flavors: Jamaica, Peach and Lemon. In 2007 the product was renamed as Ciel Finamente Gasificada and later in 2008 was replaced by a new sparkling water line called Aquarius.

In 2007 Ciel became available in the cities of Saltillo and Monclova in Coahuila and Matehuala in San Luis Potosí. In that same year, Grupo Tampico bottlers in Tampico, Ciudad Valles, Poza Rica, Ciudad Mante and Ciudad Victoria replaced the purified water and club soda versions of its brand Peña Pura and turned them into Ciel; plus, CIMSA, the Coca-Cola bottling company in Toluca merged its bottled water brand De los Angeles with Ciel and renamed it as De los Angeles por Ciel and later as Ciel De Los Angeles. The De Los Angeles trademark is still property of CIMSA. At the end of 2008, Coca-Cola acquired Manantial Water from Grupo Yoli and became part of the Ciel lineup.

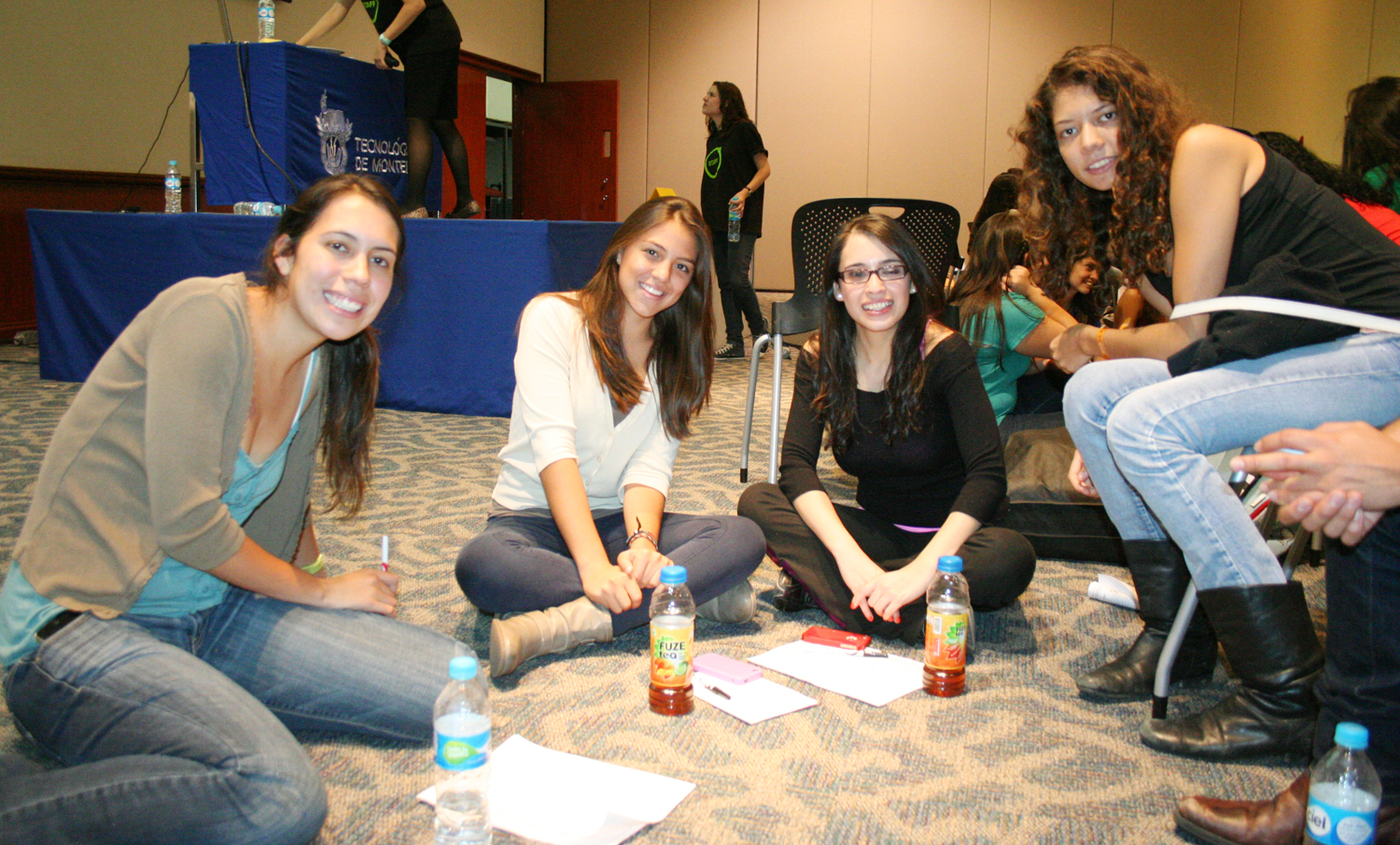
One of the teams at the "Reto Ciel" competition at ITESM-Campus Ciudad de México.

== Distribution ==
Ciel products are bottled and distributed by the Coca-Cola system, but only two Coca-Cola bottlers (Bebidas Refrescantes de Nogales and Bepensa) are selling their own bottled water brands, Nana and Cristal respectively, instead of Ciel water in their territories.

Arca Continental distributes ciel brands in their territories although they sell Topo Chico, their own mineral water brand, instead of Ciel Mineralizada in their northern territories.

== Varieties ==
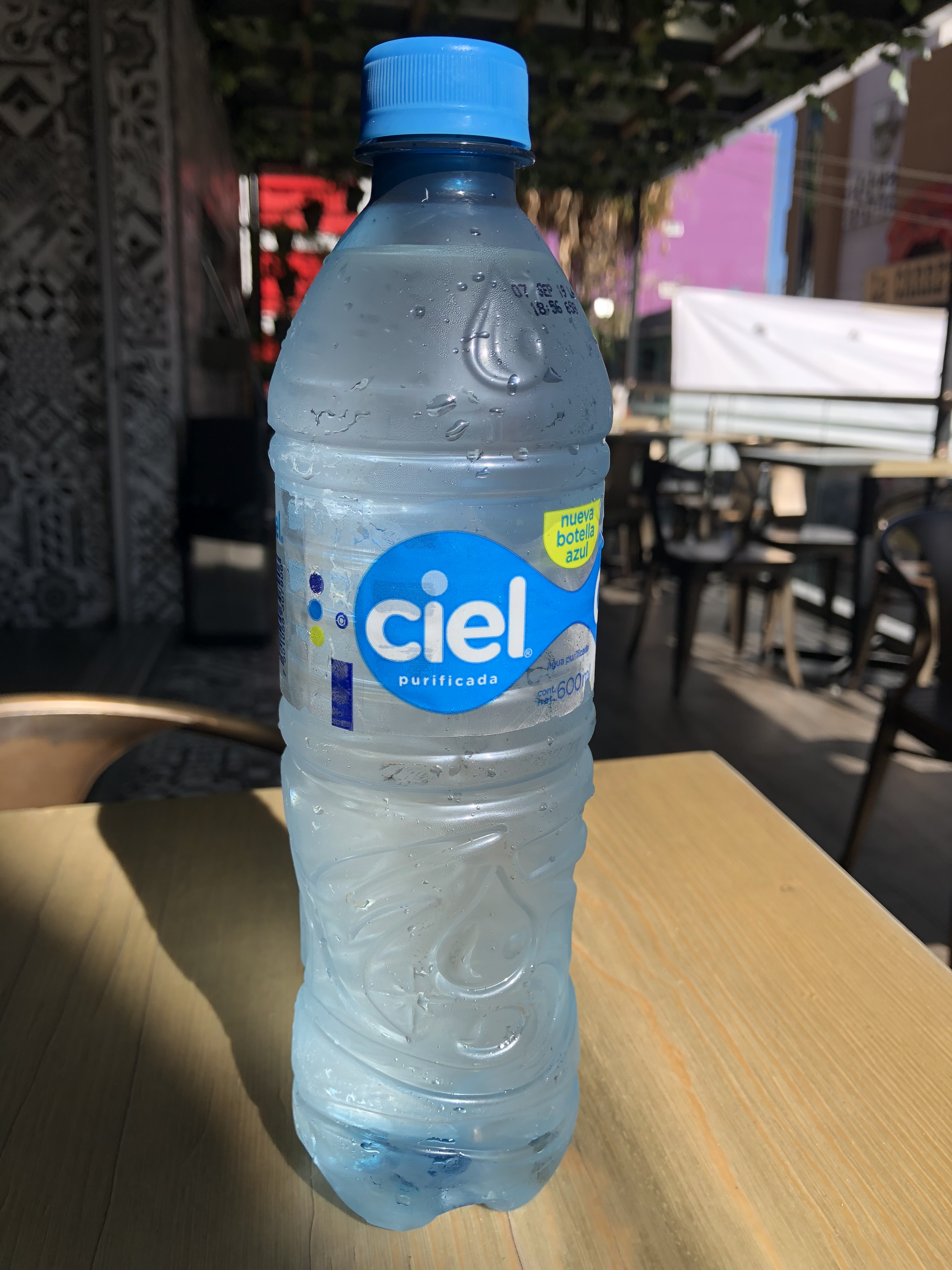
600ml bottle of ciel brand purified water bottled and distributed by Coca-Cola México

- Ciel - Purified water
- Ciel Mineralizada - Mineral water
- Ciel+ - Functional calorie-free flavored water sweetened with Splenda available in four flavors: Tangerine (active), Lime (defenses), Grapefruit (better digestion) and Jamaica (body purification)
- SierrAzul por Ciel - Purified water, available only at Coahuila, Sinaloa and Baja California Sur markets

== See also ==
- Cool Ridge
- Mount Franklin Water
- Pump
- List of Coca-Cola brands
- List of bottled water brands
