= List of soft drink products by brand name =

Brand name soft drink products (or their parent brand or brand family) include:

== By company ==
=== The Coca-Cola Company ===
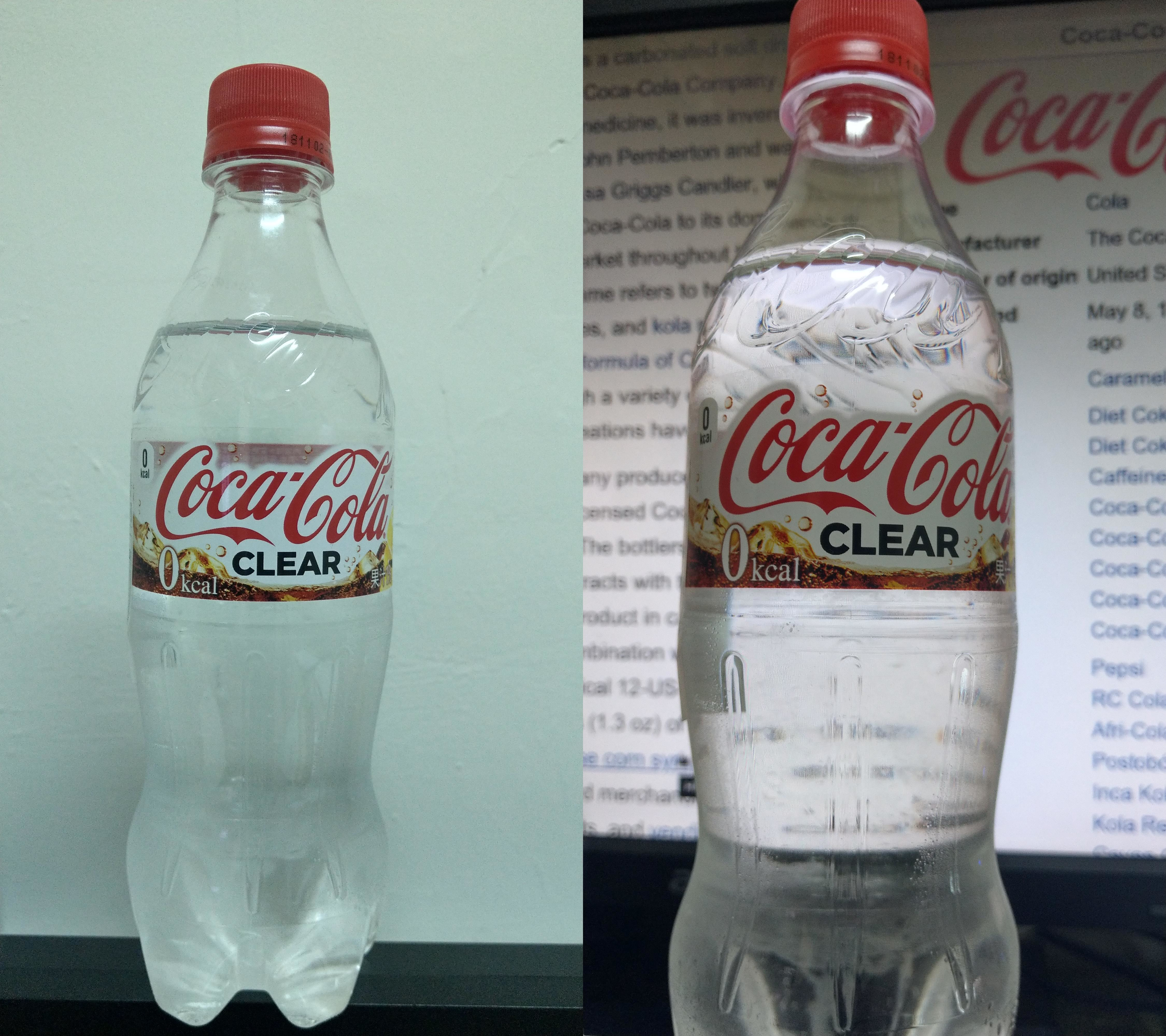
Coca-Cola Clear

- Ambasa
- Ameyal
- Appletiser
- Aquarius
- Barq's
- Beat
- Beverly (discontinued in 2009)
- Coca-Cola
  - Caffeine Free Coca-Cola
  - Coca-Cola Black Cherry Vanilla
  - Coca-Cola BlāK
  - Coca-Cola C2
  - Coca-Cola Cherry
  - Coca-Cola Citra
  - Coca-Cola Clear
  - Coca-Cola Life
  - Coca-Cola Light
  - Coca-Cola Light Sango
  - Coca-Cola Orange
  - Coca-Cola Orange Vanilla
  - Coca-Cola Raspberry
  - Coca-Cola Vanilla
  - Coca-Cola with Lemon
  - Coca-Cola with Lime
  - Coca-Cola Zero
  - Diet Coke
    - Diet Coke Lime
    - Diet Coke Plus
    - Diet Coke with Citrus Zest
    - Diet Coke with Lemon
    - Diet Coke with Zesty Blood Orange
  - New Coke (discontinued in 2002)
- Dasani

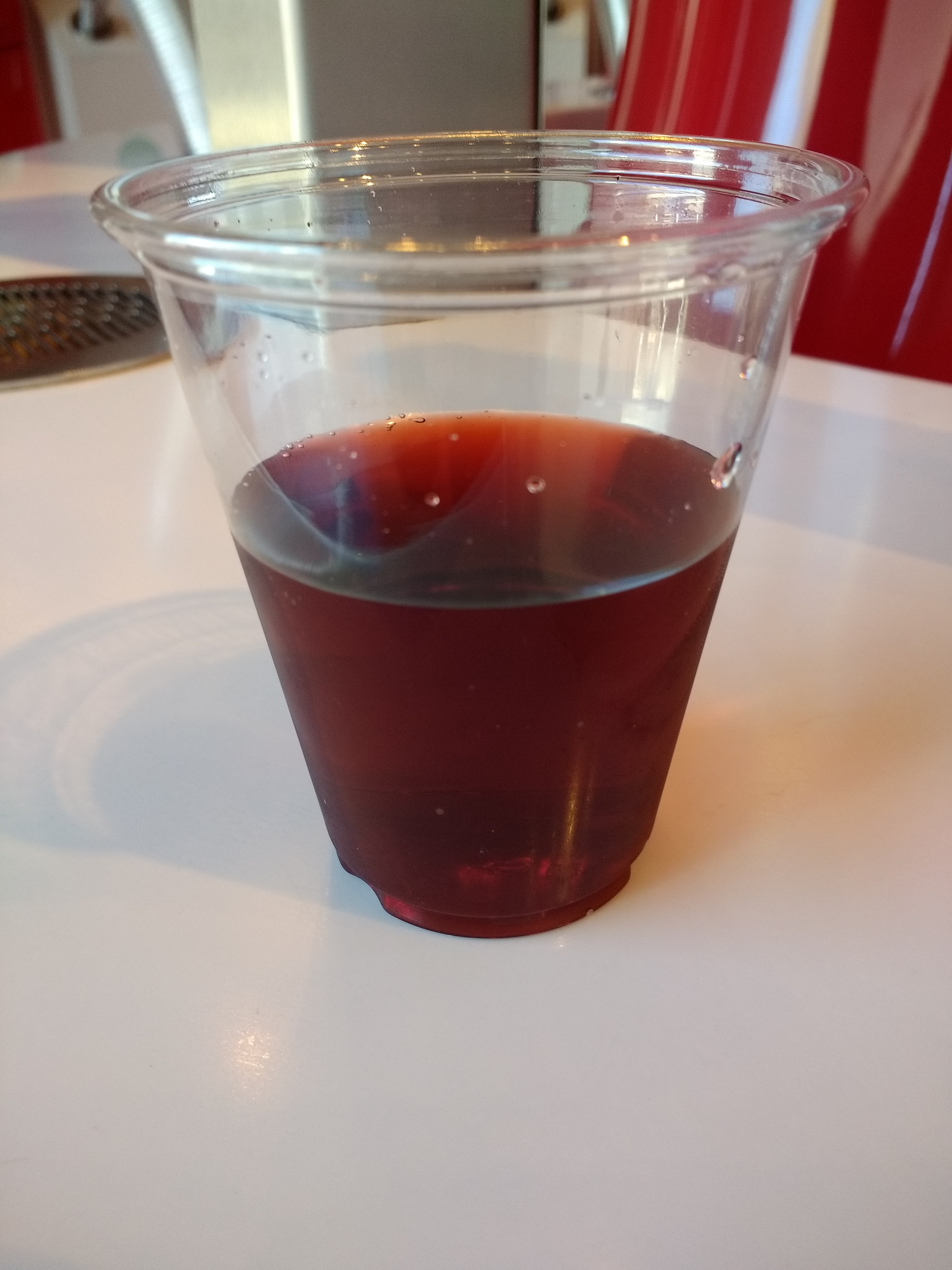
Delaware Punch

- Delaware Punch
- Fanta
  - Fanta Citrus
  - Fanta Exotic
- Fantasy
  - Cream Soda
  - Grape
  - Orange
  - Strawberry
  - Tangerine
  - Wild Cherry
  - Wild Strawberry
- Fresca
- Frescolita

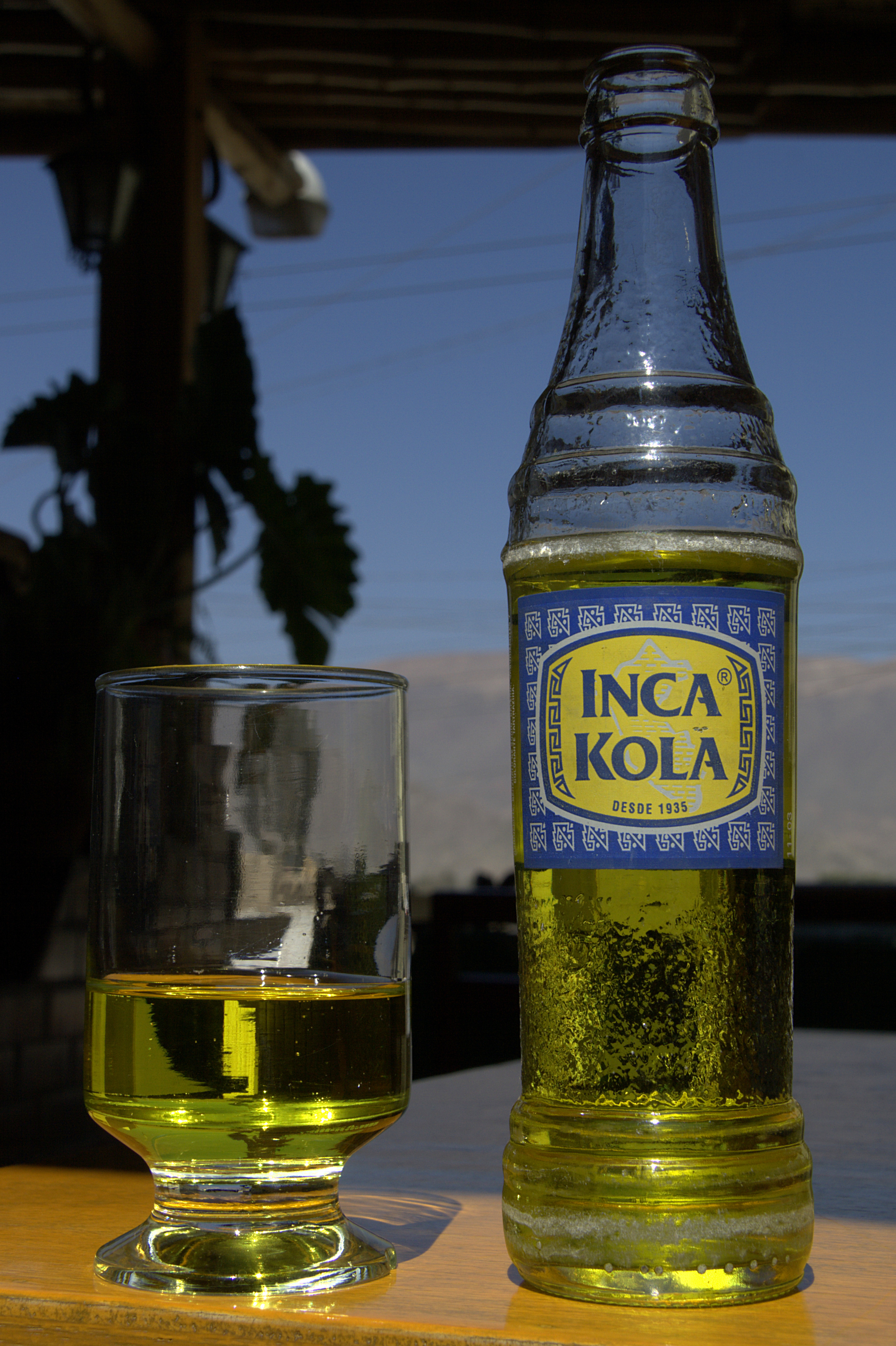
Inca Kola

- Inca Kola
  - Diet Inca Kola
- Leed (discontinued in 1984)
- Lemon & Paeroa
- Lift
- Lilt
- Limca
- Mello Yello
- Moxie
- Mr. Pibb
  - Pibb Xtra
- Powerade
- Royal Tru
- Qoo
- Sprite
  - Sprite Cranberry
  - Sprite Ice
  - Sprite Lemon+
  - Sprite Remix (discontinued in 2005)
  - Sprite Zero
- Surge
- Tab
  - Tab Clear
  - Tab Energy
- Thums Up
- Vault (discontinued in 2011)
  - Vault Red Blitz (discontinued in 2011)

=== PepsiCo ===
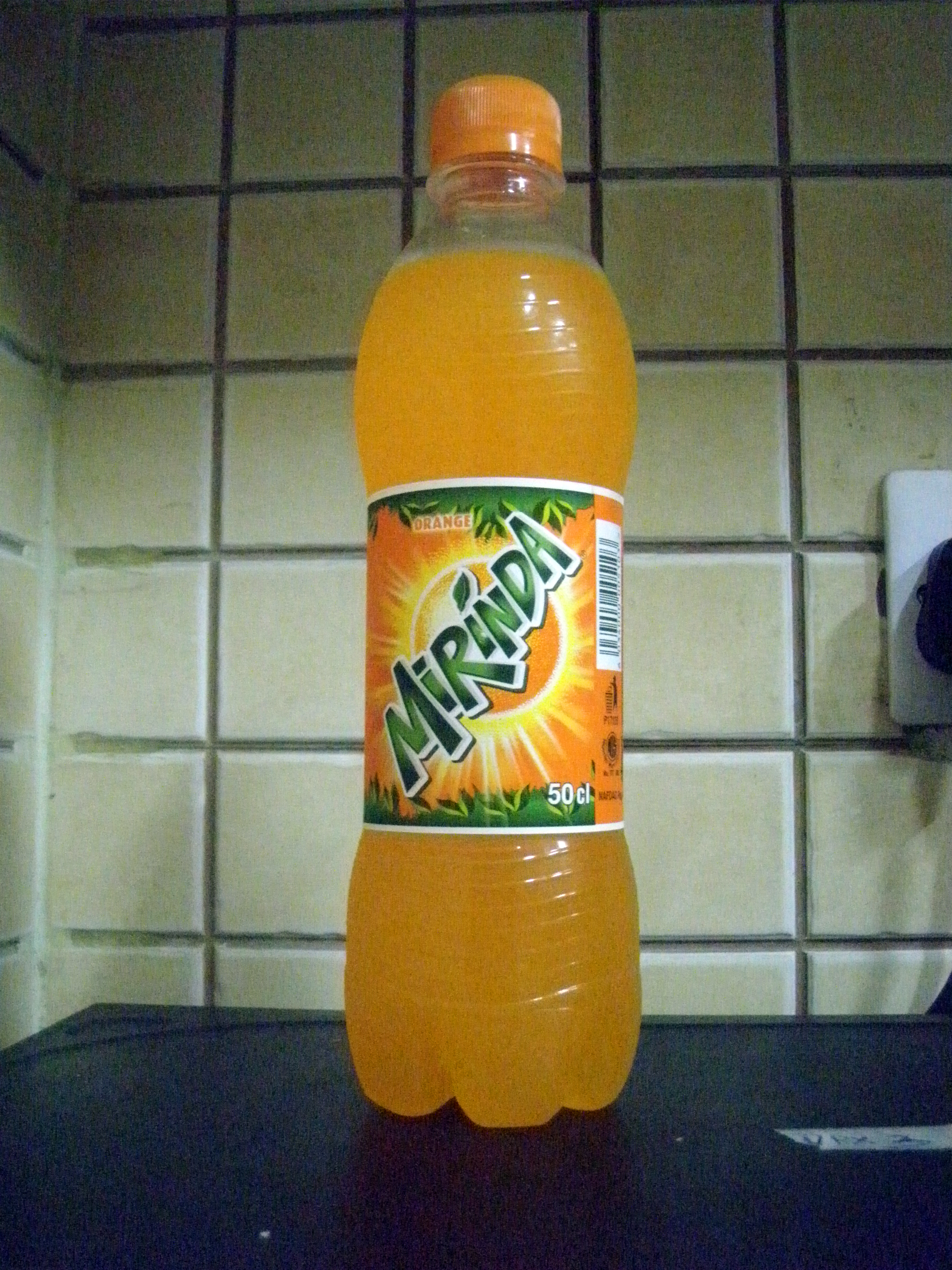
Mirinda

- AMP Energy
- Duke's
- Gatorade
- Mirinda
- Mountain Dew
  - Caffeine Free Mountain Dew
  - Diet Mountain Dew
  - KickStart
  - MDX
  - Mountain Dew Baja Blast
  - Mountain Dew Code Red
  - Mountain Dew Game Fuel (promotional)
  - Mountain Dew ICE Cherry
  - Mountain Dew ICE Lemon Lime
  - Mountain Dew LiveWire
  - Mountain Dew Pitch Black
  - Mountain Dew Pitch Black II (discontinued)
  - Mountain Dew Revolution (discontinued)
  - Mountain Dew Sangrita
  - Mountain Dew Super Nova (discontinued)
  - Mountain Dew Voltage
  - Mountain Dew White Out
- Mug Root Beer
  - Nature's Twist (regular and sugar free)
- Pepsi
  - Crystal Pepsi
  - Diet Pepsi
  - Pepsi Cola
  - Pepsi Fire
  - Pepsi Jazz Black Cherry & Vanilla
  - Pepsi Jazz Strawberries & Cream
  - Pepsi Lime
  - Pepsi Mango
  - Pepsi Max
  - Pepsi Perfect
- Rockstar Energy
- Seaman's Beverages (Orange and Ginger Ale)
- Sierra Mist (discontinued in 2023)
- Slice (discontinued)
- Starry

=== Keurig Dr Pepper ===
- 50/50
- 7 Up
- A&W Cream Soda
- A&W Root Beer
- Barrelhead Root Beer
- Big Red (soft drink)
- Cactus Cooler
- Canada Dry
- Canfield's Diet Chocolate Fudge
- Crush
- Dr Pepper
- Gini
- Hawaiian Punch
- Hires Root Beer
- IBC Root Beer
- RC Cola
  - Diet Rite
  - Nehi
- Ricqlès
- Schweppes
- Squirt
- Stewart's Fountain Classics
- Sun Drop
- Sunkist
- Sussex Golden
- Venom Energy
- Vernors
- Wink

=== Hamoud Boualem ===
- Hamoud
- Orange Blaze
- Selecto
- Slim (Lemon)
- Slim (Orange)
- Lim on orange
- Lim on lemon and lime

o’ju orange o’ju cocktail

=== National Beverage ===
- Faygo
- La Croix Sparkling Water
- Shasta

=== Others ===
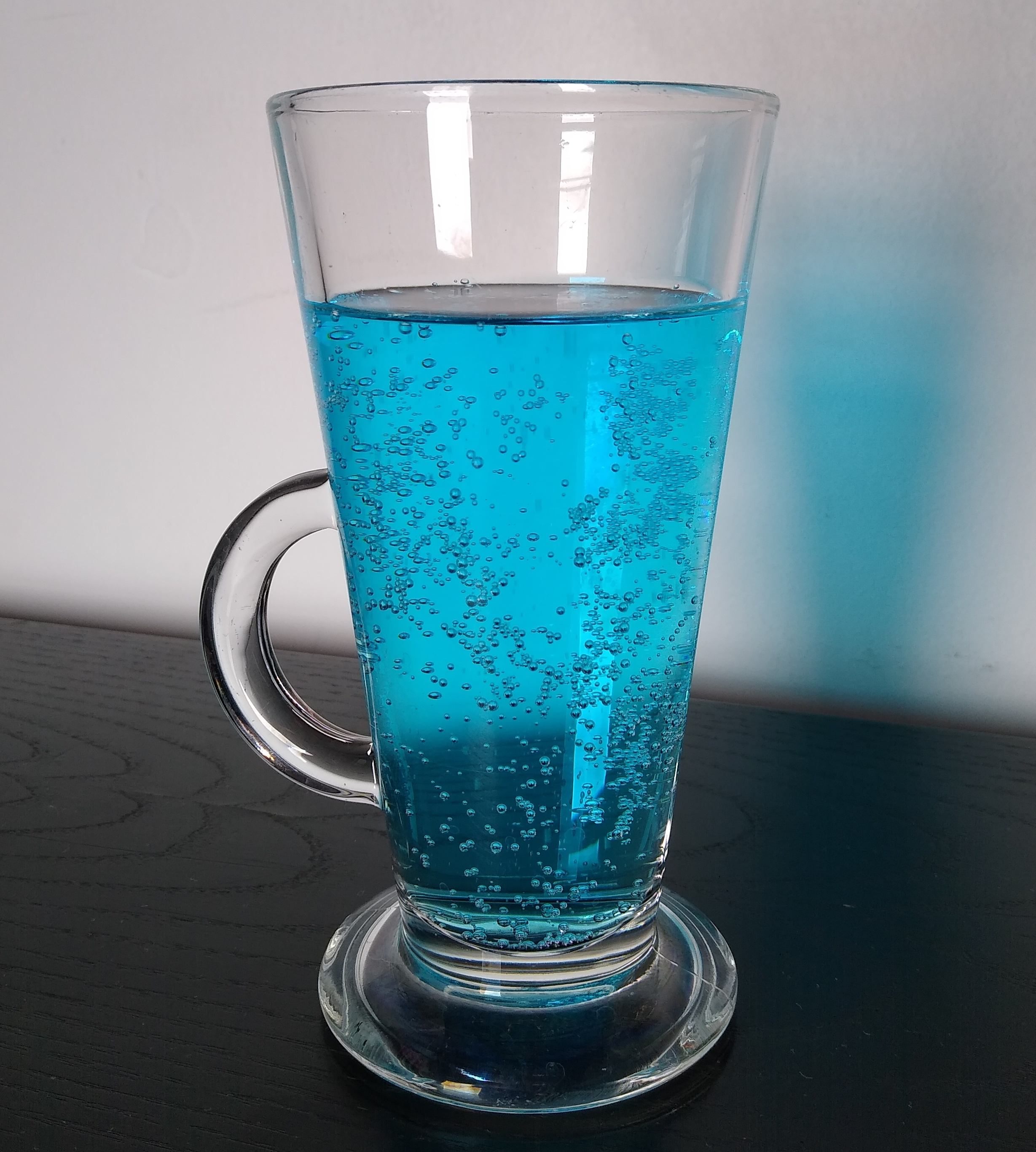
Barr

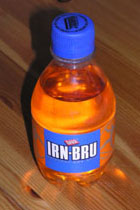
Irn-Bru

- Ale-8-One
- Barr
- Bawls
- Boylan Bottling Company
- Cheerwine
- Dr Brown's
- Irn-Bru
- Jarritos
- Jones Soda
- Julebrus
- Julmust
- Kinnie
- Lucozade
- Monster Energy
  - Full Throttle
- Moxie
- Nehi
- Orangina
- Oronamin C Drink
- Pocari Sweat
- Sangria Señorial
- Shloer
- Sidral Mundet
- Sodastream
- Steaz
- Sumol
- Tizer
- Vimto

== By type ==
=== Cola ===
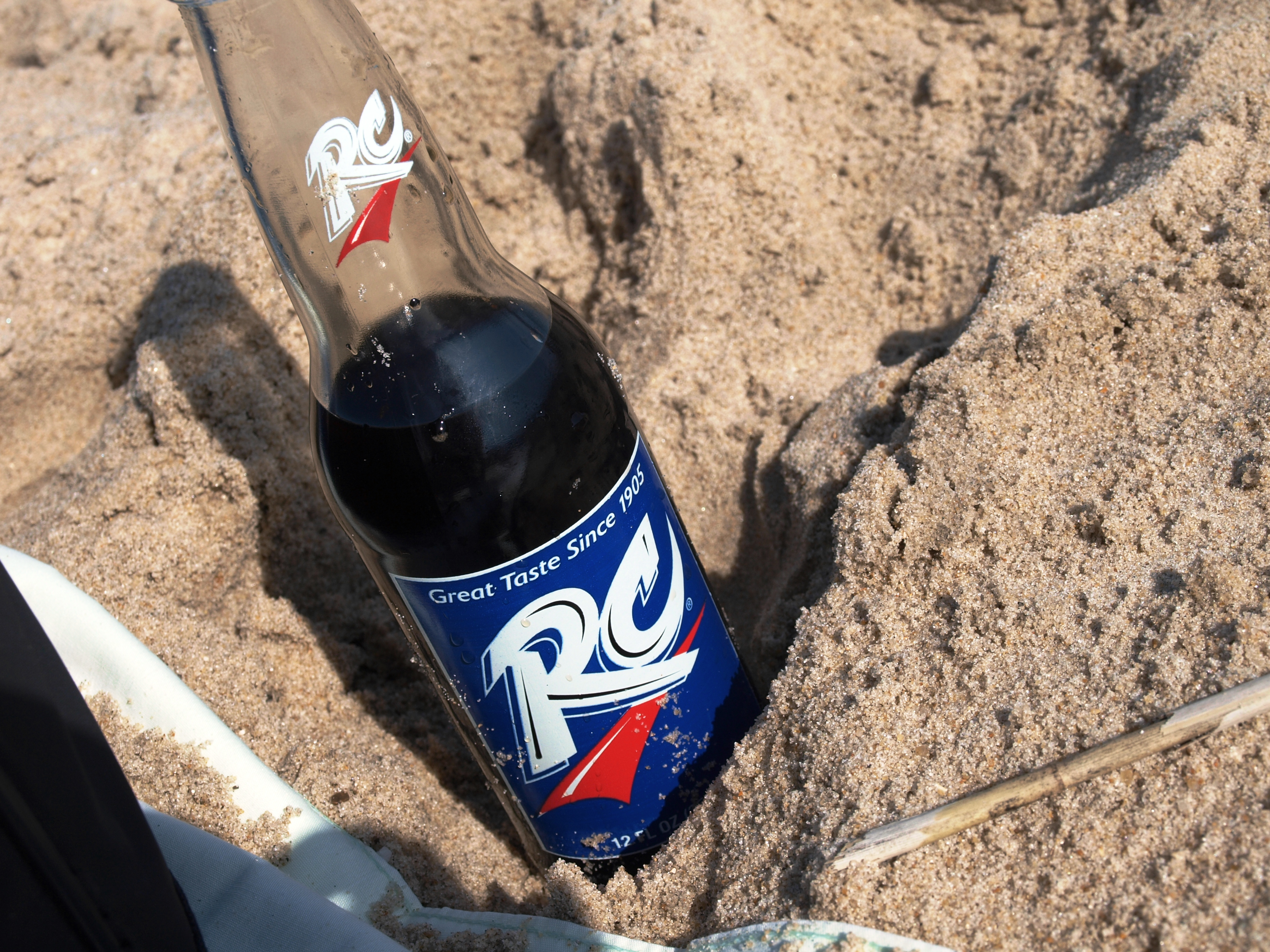
RC Cola

- Breizh Cola
- Coca-Cola
- Green Cola
- Jolt Cola
- Mecca Cola
- Pepsi
- RC Cola
- Topsia Cola
- Virgin Vanilla Cola

=== Lemonade ===
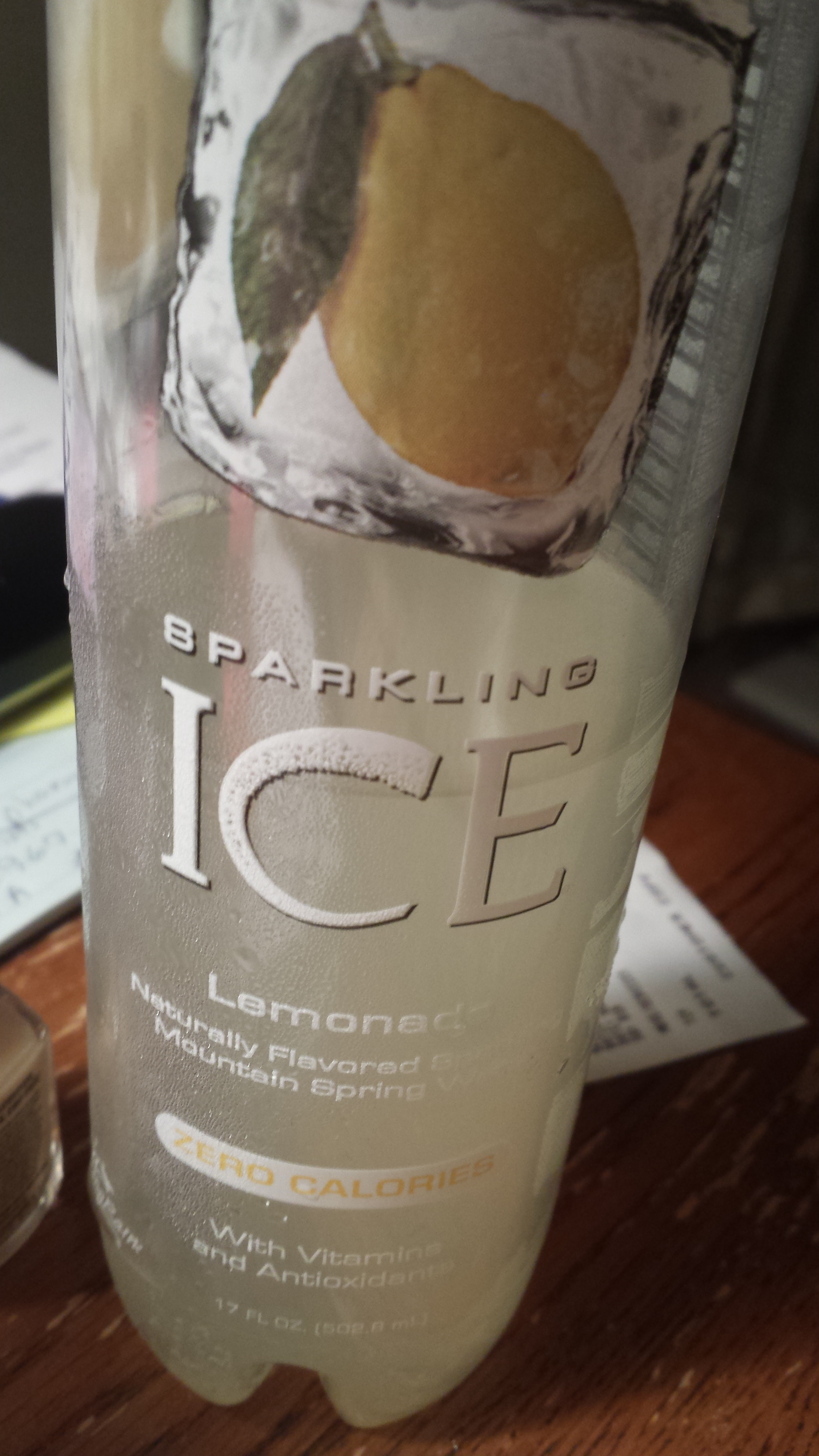
Sparkling Ice (Lemonade Flavor)

- Bubble up
- Corona
- Cresta
- R. White's (Britvic)
- Sprite

=== Citrus soda ===
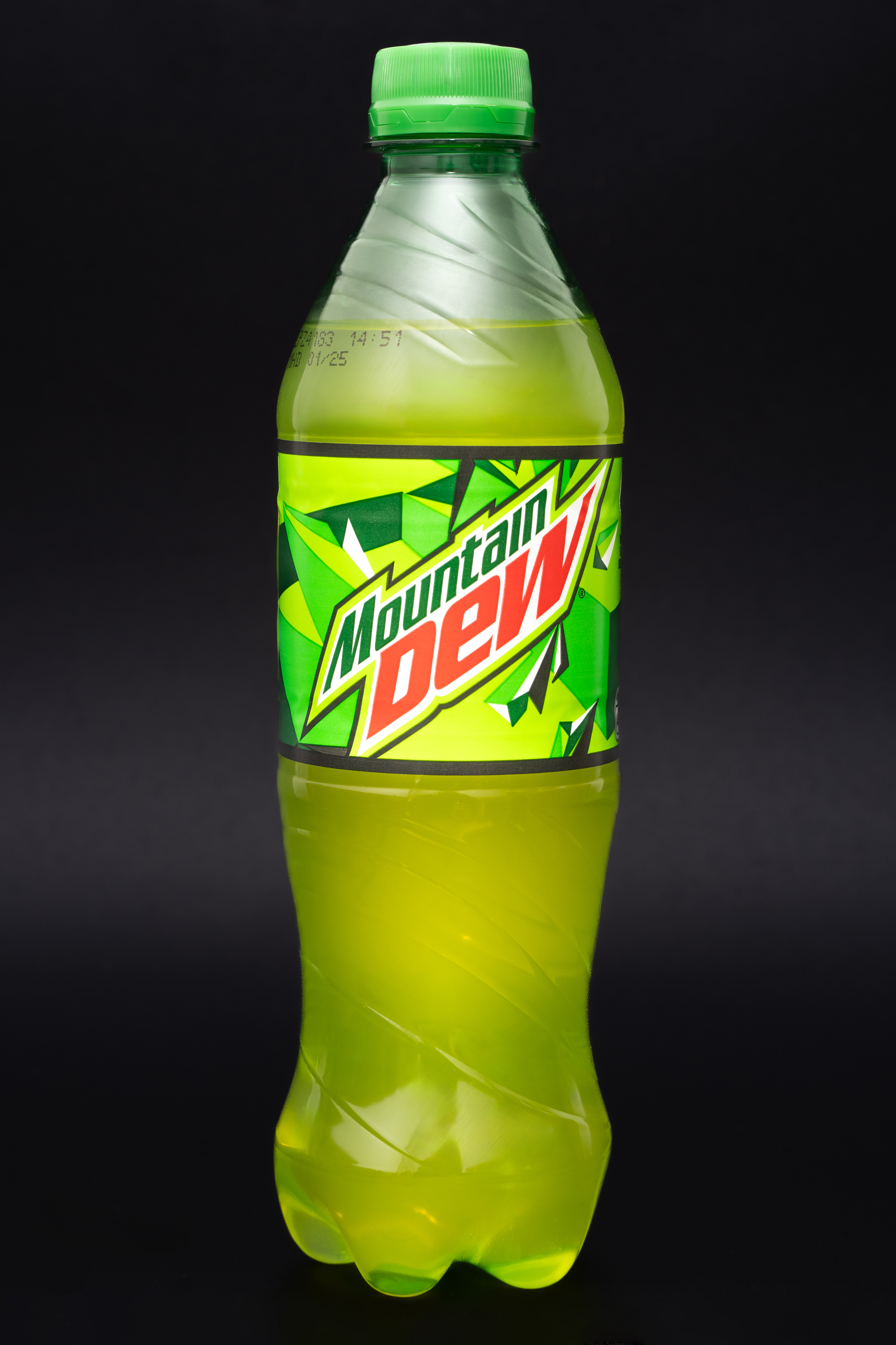
Mountain Dew (Original Citrus Flavor)

- Britvic
  - Tango
- Kinnie
- Quatro
- Ramune
- Solo (Australia) (lemon flavored)
- Solo (Norway) (orange flavored)
- Squirt
- Tropicana Tw!ster Soda
- Mountain Dew

=== Mineral water ===
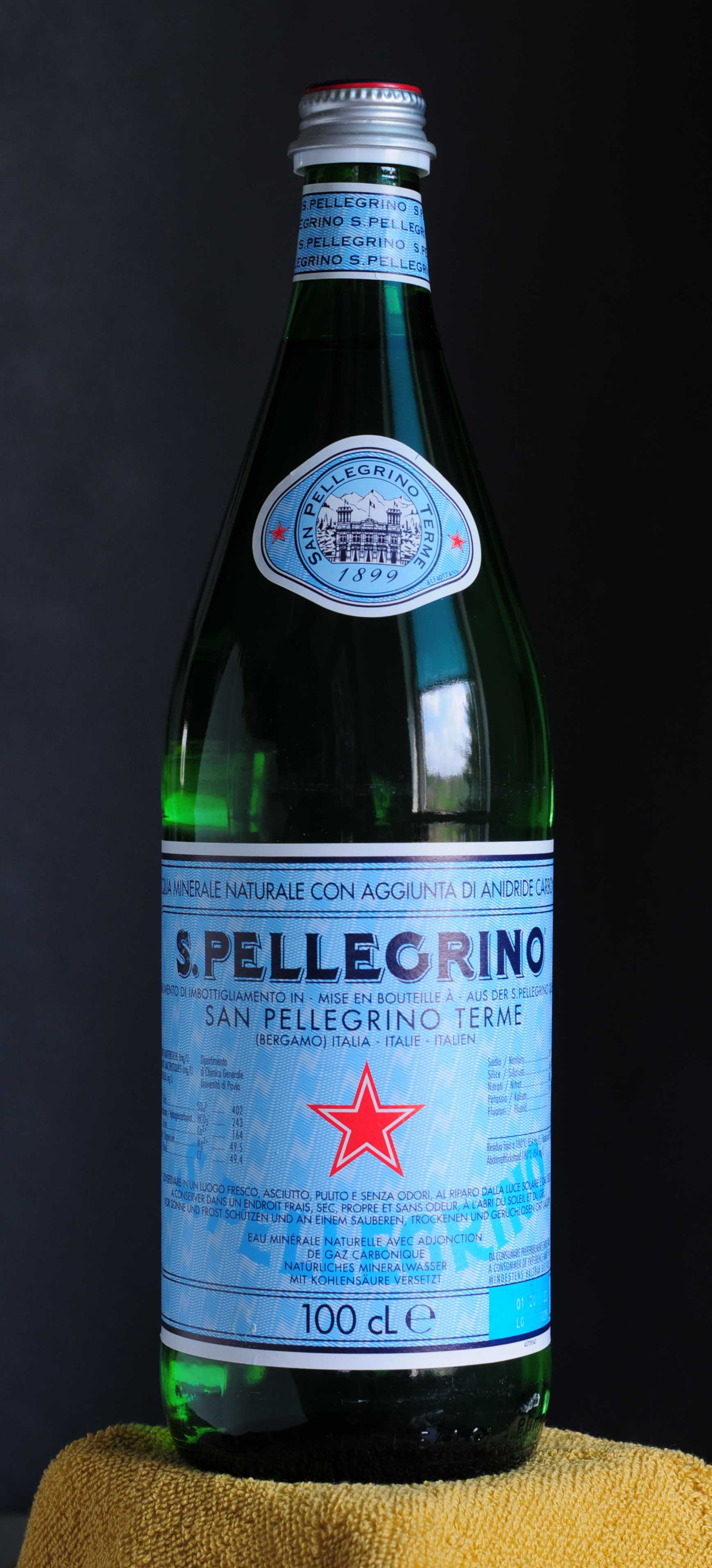
San Pellegrino

- Aquafina
- Bilbor
- Bisleri
- Borsec
- Buxton
- Buziaș
- Damavand
- Fiji
- Highland Spring
- Masafi
- Nectar
- Nestle
- Perrier
- Polar Beverages
- San Pellegrino
- Vittel
- Volvic
  - Volvic Revive
- Voss

=== Juice (and related) ===
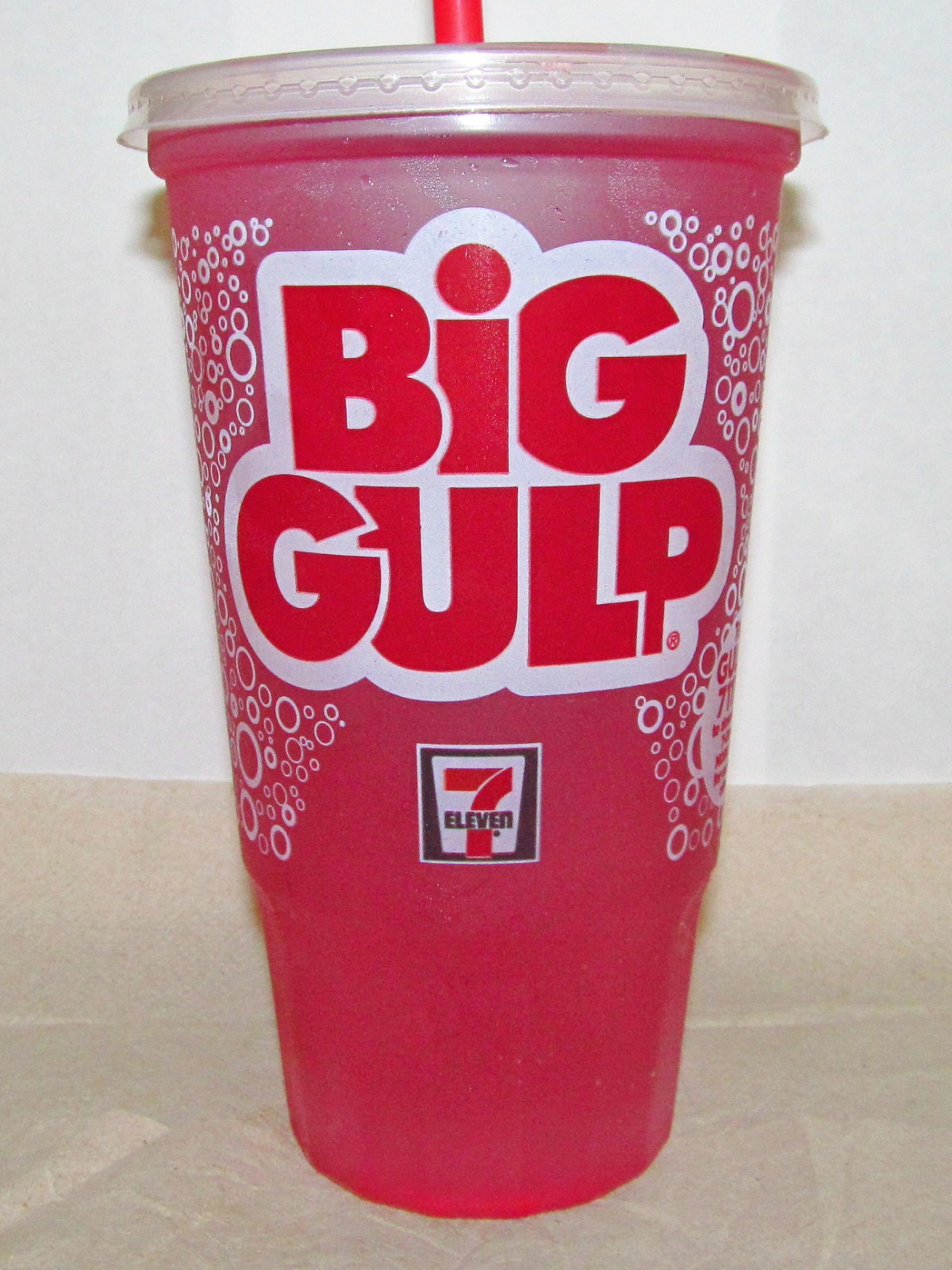
7-Eleven Big Gulp (Hawaiian Punch)

- Copella
- Cottee's
- Crusha
- Frijj
- Izze
- J2O
- Kool-Aid
- Minute Maid
- Mott's
- Orangina
- Pago International
- Pet
- Robinsons
- Suntop
- Yazoo Chill
- Yoo-hoo
- Hawaiian Punch

=== Other ===
- Bacon soft drink (various producers)
- Bludwine / Budwine
- Liptonice
- Dash Water

== See also ==
- List of soft drink flavors
- List of soft drink producers
- List of soft drinks by country
