= Gin bucket =

Gin Bucket
- Type: Mixed drink
- Ingredients: One or Two handles Gin; 4 L Fresca, Sprite, 7-up, Sierra Mist, or Squirt; Fresh squeezed citrus fruit
- Base spirit: Gin
- Standard drinkware: bucket+turkey baster
- Preparation: Mix all in bucket, add ice

A gin bucket is an American mixed drink consisting of gin and typically Fresca placed in a suitably sized bucket, with ice and chopped fruit added. Traditionally, the gin is drunk by means of a turkey baster, eliminating the need for glasses.

== History ==
The gin bucket is an Indiana University tailgating tradition. A specially themed gin bucket is used during the annual Indiana v. Purdue football game, Old Oaken Bucket, using a wooden bucket, appropriately called the "Old Oaken Bucket O'Gin." Indiana has served as a spawning spot for the Gin Bucket which has since been brought to many other Midwestern universities (such as Northwestern University), including notoriously "dry" campus at which the bucket has an underground following.

== Drinking ==
One of the key aspects of the gin bucket is that of how it is consumed. A proper gin bucket is to be consumed using a turkey baster. In some regions, a gin bucket is traditionally drunk with a gathering of 6 to 10 people and 2 turkey basters. The drinkers circle around the bucket with the turkey basters on opposite sides. The basters are then filled and tapped over the top of the bucket to signal that the bucket has begun. The starting people then drink the baster, fill it up and pass it to the person to their left, who continues the pattern. If the two basters ever catch up to each other, the person with the two basters must drink both and then the basters are split to opposite sides and the race starts over again. Gin buckets are also consumed without a competitive approach, but there is still often the unspoken agreement that the last person to baste must fill and then give to another to drink, keeping the baster in motion.

== Variations ==
Many variations exist among different regions, typically varying the soda with fresh citrus juices, although in some instances Tequila is added to create a "superbucket." Also, several holiday themed containers have replaced the typical bucket, such as replacing the bucket with a plastic Jack-o'-lantern, thus creating a "Jack-o'Gin."
