= Damavand (disambiguation) =

Damavand (Persian: دماوند) may refer to one of these:

- Mount Damavand, the highest peak in Iran
- Damavand County, a county in Tehran Province
- Damavand, Iran, the capital of Damavand County
- Damavand Mineral Water, an Iranian brand of mineral water
- Damavand Street, a street in central and eastern Tehran
- Damavand College
- Iranian frigate Damavand
