= National Association of Cider Makers =

- Abbreviation: NACM
- Formation: 1920
- Purpose: Cider and perry making in England, Wales, Scotland and Northern Ireland
- Location: The Bounds, Much Marcle, Herefordshire, HR8 2NQ
- Region served: England, Wales, Scotland and Northern Ireland
- Members: English, Welsh, Scottish and Northern Irish cider makers
- Chairman: David Sheppy
- Affiliations: Association of the Cider and Fruit Wine Industries of the European Union (AICV), Welsh Perry & Cider Society, South West of England Cider Makers Association, Three Counties Cider and Perry Association
- Website: cideruk.com

The National Association of Cider Makers is a membership organisation that represents the UK cider industry.

== Function ==
Formed in 1920, the NACM represents cider makers, large and small, across Great Britain and Northern Ireland. The major centres of production are in Herefordshire and Somerset in England, but cider makers are now present outside of these traditional areas.

The UK cider industry produces around 750 million litres of cider a year, utilising 56% of all the apples grown in the UK. Cider has less than a 7% share of the UK drinks market, considerably less than beer, wine and spirits.

Twice a year the NACM hosts a reception at Westminster with the All Party Parliamentary Cider Group to champion cider makers and the wider cider category.

== Structure ==
Members include:

- Aspall
- Aston Manor
- C&C Group
- Carlsberg (Somersby)
- Cornish Orchards
- H. P. Bulmer
- Merrydown
- Molson Coors
- Sheppy's
- Thatchers
- Weston's

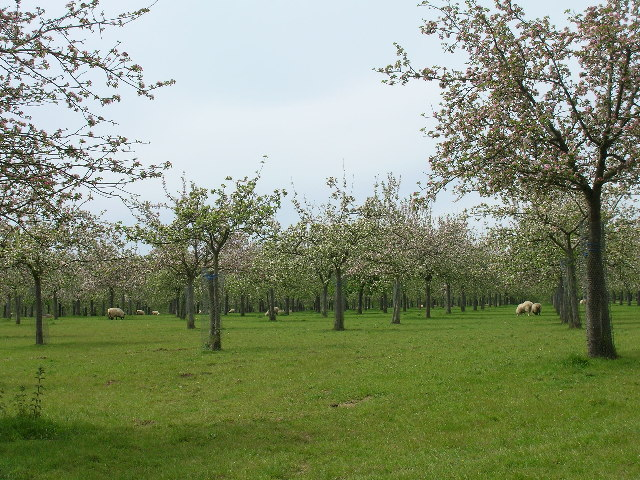
Cider apple orchard in Somerset
