= Citra =

Citra may refer to:

- Chitra (art), a historic art that includes paintings, sketching with or without multiple colors
- Citra (drink), a lemon flavored soda sold in India in the late 1980s and early '90s, owned by the Parle group
- Citra (emulator), a discontinued experimental Nintendo 3DS emulator
- Citra Awards, or Piala Citra, the annual awards for cinematic achievements in Indonesia
- Citra, Florida, town
- Citra, a beverage by The Coca-Cola Company later rebranded as Fanta Citrus
- Coca-Cola Citra, a Coca-Cola variant manufactured by The Coca-Cola Company
- Astro Citra, Malaysian pay-TV channel 131
- Citra, a variety of hops
- the English guitar
- Citra, the name for PK-CLC, the aircraft involved in the crash of Sriwijaya Air Flight 182
