= Joel Veitch =

British artist (born 1974)

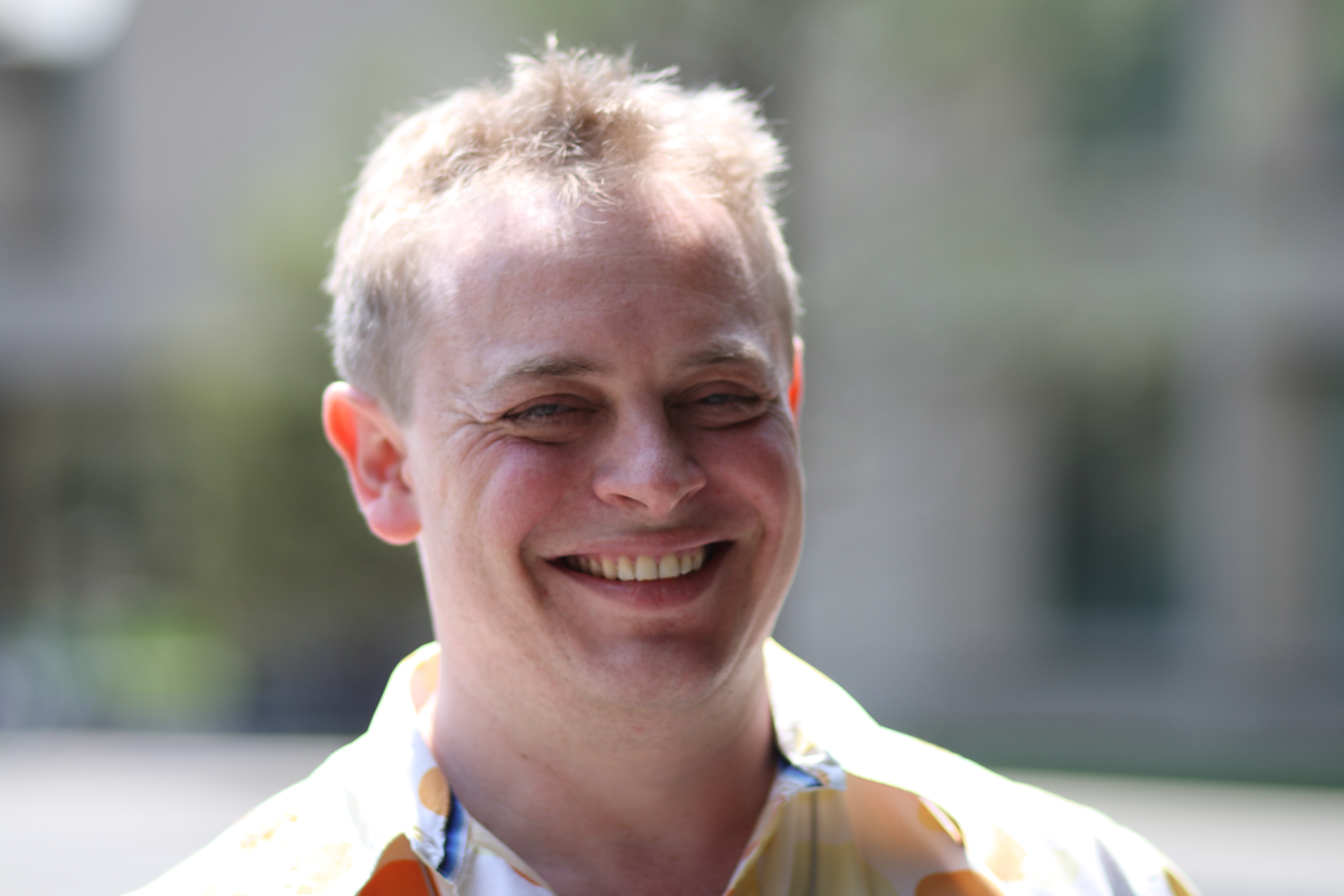
- Joel Veitch at ROFLCon II in 2010
- Born: March 28, 1974 (age 51)
- Other names: Crab Bloke, Stallion Explosion
- Website: rathergood.com

Joel Veitch (born 28 March 1974) is the showrunner and co-creator of Bad Dinosaurs, a family cartoon on Netflix released on March 28, 2024. He is a British web animator, singer-songwriter, and member of the humour website B3ta. Veitch is owner of the web site RatherGood, where he showcases many of his animations.

== Albums ==
Veitch has released 3 albums of music as rathergood.com and an album with his band 7 Seconds Of Love. The rathergood.com albums are only available as digital downloads, while the 7 Seconds of Love is also available physically. Veitch sings and writes on all of these albums.

- rathergood.com – Rathergood Songs (2007)
- 7 Seconds Of Love – Danger Is Dangerous (2008)
- rathergood.com – Spongs in the Key Of Life (2009)
- rathergood.com – The Ham Machine (2011)

== Animations ==
Among his many animations, a series of kittens performing various songs has attracted attention online. These include "Punk Kittens" ("Fell In Love With a Girl" by the White Stripes), two videos with the "Viking Kittens" ("Immigrant Song" by Led Zeppelin, and "Gay Bar" by Electric Six).

== Movies ==
Several of Veitch's movies, including one featuring a remake of Destiny's Child's Independent Woman by Elbow, are played and sung by kittens, similar to the Crusha adverts which Veitch also created.

Some of Veitch's other movies feature actual songs by artists such as Madonna, with either slightly edited lyrics, and/or with modified subtitles, and always with fitting, and sometimes funny animations.

== Commercial work ==
Veitch is responsible for many adverts and other spots on both British and US TV.

- Half hour animated Christmas special Uncle Wormsley's Christmas, starring Steve Coogan, Julian Barratt, Julia Davis, John Thomson and Ben Baker aired on Sky Atlantic
- Switch/Maestro adverts featuring singing penguins.
- Crusha adverts featuring singing kittens.
- Quiznos Subs advertised by the Spongmonkeys (through the song "We Love the Subs", based upon Veitch's earlier song "We Like the Moon")
- Virgin Trains viral online ads at www.littlerbritain.co.uk, featuring only-barely double entendres about large things wreaking havoc on a "Smaller Britain"
- VH1 promo spots featuring singing kittens with songs such as "Karma Chameleon" by Culture Club, "Welcome to the Jungle" by Guns N' Roses and "I Love Rock 'N Roll" by Joan Jett.
- The television programme Rathergood Videos featuring his own and others music videos, which aired early in the morning on Channel 4.
- Various animations of his were featured on the Channel 4 music programme Born Sloppy.
- Written and composed songs for the CiTV series Jim Jam & Sunny.
- Joel appeared as the "Internet go-to guy" for Nuts TV, and appears on Sky News and BBC News as an Internet-savvy guest.

In January 2007, Veitch reached a settlement with Coca-Cola after they used music and video very similar to 7 Seconds of Love's song "Ninja" on one of their adverts in Argentina without permission.

== Amateur Science ==
Veitch led Project Space Planes which was an attempt by amateur scientists to break the flight record by a paper airplane.

== Awards ==
Veitch has received three Webby Awards, a Webby People's Choice Award and a further Webby nomination for rathergood.com.

His film Uncle Wormsley's Christmas was awarded Best Original Score at the Sapporo International Short Film Festival. Uncle Wormsley's Christmas was also nominated for Best Animated Film in the International Film Awards Berlin.
