= Glendale beet sugar factory =

- U.S. National Register of Historic Places
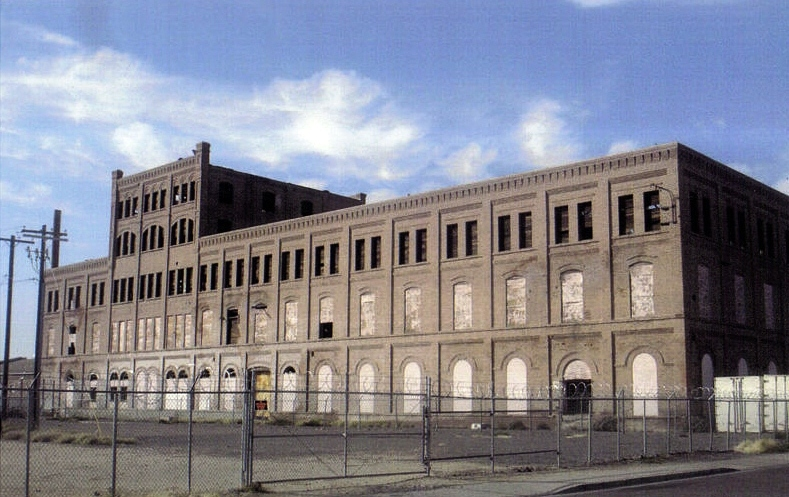

- Location within Arizona Location within the United States
- Location: 5243 W. Glendale Ave., Glendale, Arizona
- Coordinates: 33°32′15″N 112°10′16″W
- Built: 1903-1906
- NRHP reference No.: 78000548
- Added to NRHP: January 30, 1978

The Glendale beet sugar factory is a former processing facility that was built in Glendale, Arizona, between 1903 and 1906 to process sugar beets. The area's soil was considered prime for agriculture and federal reports stated that sugar beets would be a good crop to grow in the area.

It is unclear when the facility ceased processing sugar, but it was repurposed as a beer distribution center, storage facility, Squirt soda plant and soy-sauce production facility before closing in 1986. It has not re-opened since despite attempts.

== History ==
The building opened as a beet sugar factory in 1906 started by Glendale, Arizona founder William J. Murphy. The factory ran into a number of challenges throughout its run, from needing to change the water sources used to wash its beets, the amount of water necessary to grow sugar beets in the area, low amounts of sugar being produced from the beets, and insect infestations of the crops. During World War I, the factory was updated to process sugar cane to meet the country's demand for sugar, but the cane crop needed an increased water supply.

It has also been used as a beer distribution center, storage facility, Squirt soda plant and soy-sauce production facility. The doors closed for good in 1986. Plans to restore the factory have been discussed; immediately following its closure, some wanted it to become a civic center and the Forward Brands spirits company was planning to move its production there in 2011.

== Legacy ==
Despite often being seen as an "eyesore", some locals still regard the building for its historical significance to the city. Plans to renovate and reopen the factory in some capacity were still being floated as of 2016.

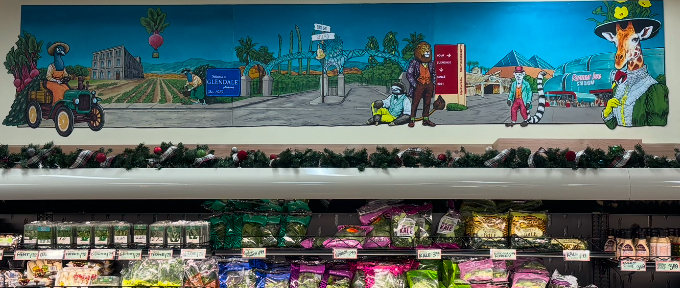
Trader Joe's store mural depicting the factory (far left) and other landmarks

The Trader Joe's grocery store in Glendale has a mural featuring the factory along with several other Glendale icons.
