= Project Space Planes =

Project Space Planes was an attempt by amateur scientists to break the flight record by a paper airplane and an advertising campaign devised by the people at Samsung. It was designed to advertise their SD Memory card.

== Overview ==
The project was led by Joel Veitch, a British web animator. The idea was to take hundreds of paper aeroplanes all with SD cards attached and dangle them underneath a helium weather balloon this balloon would then travel all the way to the edge of space before releasing the paper planes to fall back down to earth. Each memory card would contain a personal message to the person who found it. The people who find these SD cards will then hopefully message back the Project Space Planes team so they could see how far the paper planes had travelled. The point of this exercise by the organisers was to set the world record for the longest flight by a paper plane, and by the sponsors Samsung to prove how tough their SD cards were.

== Launch ==
The launch was delayed multiple times due to weather issues but finally took place from a barn in Wolfsburg in Germany. 200 paper plans were launched from a balloon filled with 7,815 litres of helium gas, reached 37,339 metres (122,503 feet) before it burst and fell back down to earth. It took about 2.6 hours to rise up to this height and then only 40 minutes to fall back down and land. The payload travelled over 300 kilometres from the launch site near Wolfsburg and landed just north of Schonwald, narrowly dodging a lake, a river and a military base. (you can watch the YouTube video of the link here) https://www.youtube.com/watch?v=ApM4BGG8r40

== Results ==
The project has received reports of paper plane sightings in the German cities of Minden, Bremen and Berlin, as well as the city of Turlock in Northern California and Winnipeg, Canada, while others may have landed in South Africa and The Netherlands.
