= Fanta Citrus =

Grapefruit-flavored soft drink

Fanta Citrus (formerly Citra)
- Type: Lemon-lime soft drink
- Manufacturer: The Coca-Cola Company
- Distributor: The Coca-Cola Company
- Origin: United States
- Introduced: 1996 (as Citra)
- Discontinued: 2004 (rebranded as Fanta Citrus)
- Color: Clear
- Flavour: Grapefruit
- Related products: Fresca

Citra was a grapefruit-flavored soft drink released into the U.S. market in 1996 by The Coca-Cola Company around the same time as Surge, another citrus-flavored soft drink marketed by Coca-Cola (although Surge contained caffeine while Citra was caffeine-free). Citra had a very similar flavor to Fresca, especially the version of Fresca sold in Latin America, which is sweetened with sucrose (table sugar) rather than aspartame as in the American version of Fresca. It also had a flavor similar to Squirt, except that Squirt contains a trace of orange or tangerine flavoring. Citra also had a very similar flavor to that of Canfield's 50/50.

In the U.S., Citra was rebranded as Fanta Citrus as of 15 March 2004. Citra should not be confused with Coca-Cola Citra, a variety of Coca-Cola with citrus flavoring.

The original marketing campaign had the theme "Curiously crisp Citra". The drink was always referred to as "citrus flavored" and never as grapefruit flavored, even though most of the taste was grapefruit and sugar.

It was made in the Citrus Blend and Lemon flavors. Fanta Citrus is now discontinued, but was only in certain areas of the U.S.

A flavor of Fanta, Fanta Grapefruit, is said to taste similar to Citra.

== See also ==
- Fresca
- Surge
- Canfield's 50/50
- List of defunct consumer brands
