= Steaz =

Beverages brand specializing in organic

- Flower logo used on Steaz products
- Type: Private
- Industry: Organic & fair trade green tea beverages
- Founded: 2002
- Founder: Eric Schnell, Steven Kessler
- Headquarters: Doylestown, Pennsylvania, U.S.
- Products: Steaz Iced Green Tea, Steaz Energy
- Number of employees: 8 (2015)
- Parent: The Healthy Beverage Company
- Website: steaz.com

Steaz, a brand of organic green tea-based beverages, was established in 2002 by co-founders Steven Kessler and Eric Schnell. The Steaz brand, headquartered in Doylestown, Pennsylvania, is currently owned by the privately held Healthy Beverage Company.

== History ==
In the 1990s, prior to the founding of Steaz, both Schnell and Kessler were employed at Country Life Vitamins. The business was described as fledgling, but produced a somewhat profitable organic bottled tea product called Long Life Tea. Based on this success, the observation that soft drinks were being removed from schools, and the growth in organic products in the United States, Schnell and Kessler decided to pursue the possibility of creating an organic tea-based soda product.

In 2002, The Healthy Beverage Company was founded by Schnell and Kessler, but their products would be sold under the Steaz brand name. Their first major product was Steaz Green Tea Soda, which was the first USDA Organic certified soda. All Steaz products have since been Certified Organic by Quality Assurance International (QAI) and Fair Trade Certified by TransFair USA. Initially, Steaz products were found only in local groceries and natural food markets. In 2005, Steaz signed an agreement with distributor Polar Beverages, which allowed their products have to become available in some supermarkets. In 2014 and 2015, Steaz also became available at Costco and Target stores.

In September 2011, Steaz announced its partnership with Whole Planet Foundation to help fund the Foundation's mission to provide entrepreneurs in developing countries with microcredit loans.

== Products ==
Steaz produces several varieties of canned organic green tea drinks and energy drinks, which include flavors such as peach and mint. All products are made using certified fair trade green tea from Kenya and certified fair trade cane sugar from Paraguay.

In 2025, Steaz changed the recipe for their green tea line removing the antioxidant element and lowering the sugar content.

== Reception and awards ==
Steaz products have met with generally positive reception. For instance, FastCompany and Greenopia have considered Steaz to be one of the most eco-friendly beverages available. Formal reviews of their individual products have generally been positive, although some have noted that Steaz products have similar caloric and sugar content per serving compared to traditional soft drinks such as Coke.

In 2007, Steaz was presented with the Socially Responsible Business Award. In the same year, Inc. Magazine also named Steaz as the 19th best Food & Beverage company in terms of its company growth; the company's revenue in 2003 was US$980,000 and in 2006, it had increased to $4.1M USD. It was also considered to be a "top selling brand" in vending machines selling healthy products.
