= Damavand Mineral Water Co. =

Iranian Mineral Water producer

Damavand Mineral Water Company

- Damavand Mineral Water-sportive style
- Company type: Private company
- Industry: Manufacturer
- Founded: 1973; 53 years ago
- Headquarters: Damavand, Iran
- Area served: Worldwide
- Key people: Alireza Barjasteh General Manager since April 2017
- Products: Mineral water and soft drinks
- Number of employees: 400
- Website: website

Damavand Mineral Waters Company (Persian: شرکت آب‌های معدنی دماوند) is the leader and largest bottled mineral water producer in Iran. It is a joint venture with Danone Group, number 2 in bottled water worldwide.

In 2010 and in 2015 Iran's Health Ministry announced that Damavand bottled water had a microbial infection and the company was prosecuted.

== History ==
In 1973, the company Perrier from France in association with local investors decided to build a mineral water plant in Iran.

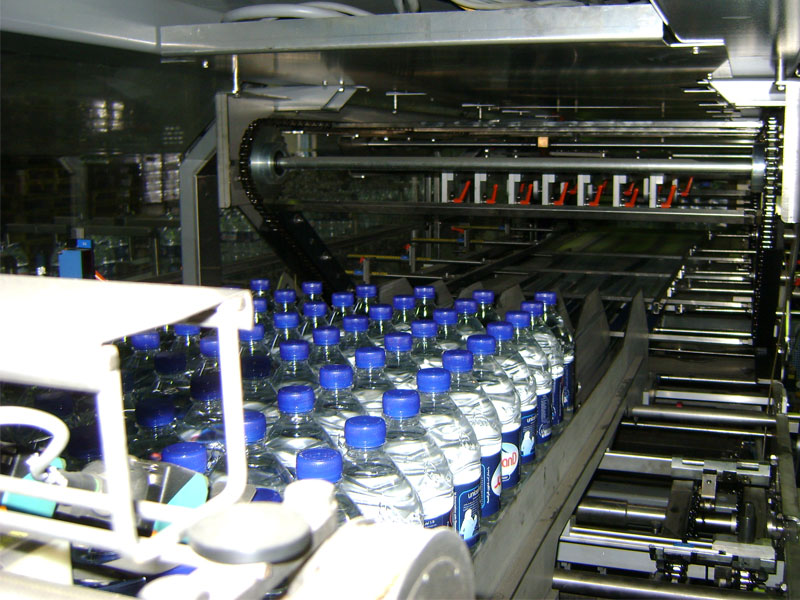
Damavand Mineral Water packing

In 1977, after all the installations were done, they started some testing and analysis of the water, and in 1978 the company started to present its products to the market as the first mineral water company in Iran. In 1998, Group Castel from France became partners with the Iranian owners and they started to grow the firm. In 2006, group Danone from France (the leader of mineral water in the world, owner of brands such as EVIAN & VOLVIC) bought Group Castel's share. Today, Damavand water is the leader of more than 370 MB per year. It has around 400 employees with 7 warehouses across the country.

In 2010 NATO army in Afghanistan rejected Damavand bottled water, and Iran's Health Ministry announced that Damavand bottled water was polluted.

In 2015 Iran's Health ministry announced that Damavand bottled water has microbial infection and the company was prosecuted.

== Products ==
The products are all in polyethylene terephthalate bottles with the most advanced European machines:

- Damavand Mineral Water (1.5L & 1L & 0.5L)
- Carbonated water: Sparkling mineral water: (0.3L & 1.250L)
- Soft drink: Topsia Cola, Topsia Orange, Topsia Lemon, Topsia Tropical (0.3L & 1.250L)
