= Jazz (soft drink) =

Discontinued sugar-free soda

Diet Pepsi Jazz
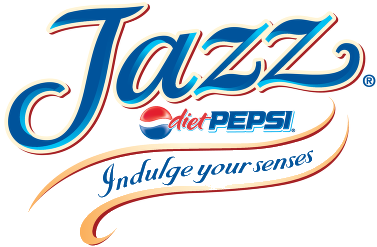
- Product type: Diet cola
- Current owner: PepsiCo
- Country: United States
- Introduced: 2006
- Discontinued: 2009; 17 years ago
- Markets: United States
- Website: https://www.jazzdietpepsi.com

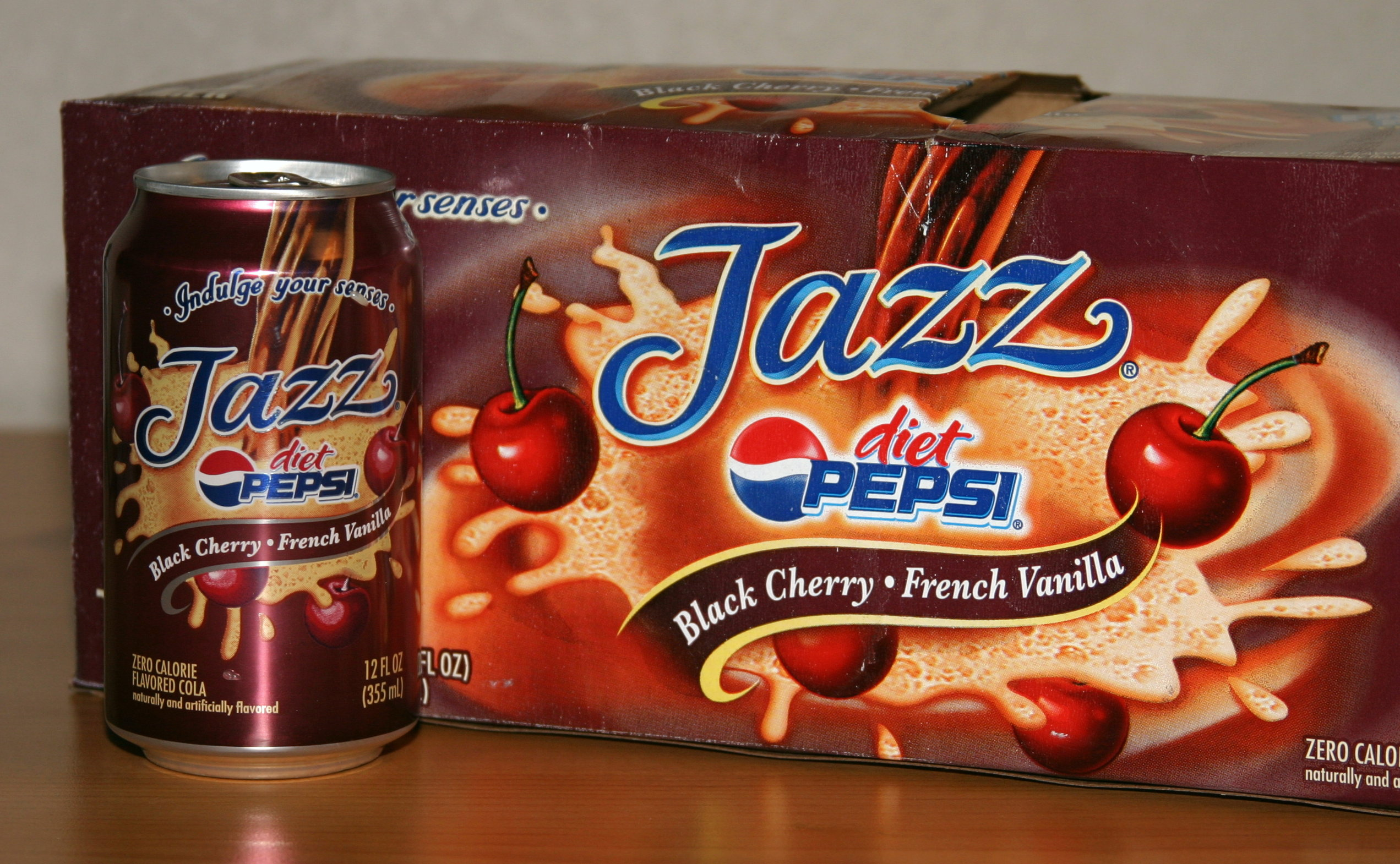
Can and package of Jazz with Black Cherry and French Vanilla flavor

Jazz was an American brand of zero-calorie soda drinks introduced by PepsiCo in summer 2006 and discontinued in 2009. It was a specifically named variant of PepsiCo's popular Diet Pepsi product, and came in three dessert-themed flavors: Black Cherry and French Vanilla, Strawberries and Cream, and Caramel Cream, the last of which launched in 2007.

== Marketing and promotion ==
PepsiCo considered the names "Splurge" and "Indulge" before deciding on "Jazz". The company launched the soda with a substantial advertising campaign, using the tagline "Jazz, the new sound of cola." The campaign included a jazz- and blues-themed television spot by DDB, with actress Leah Elias and a soundtrack by Groove Collective's Genji Siraisi, as well as a four-page advertising spread in People Magazine with a three-dimensional pop-up image of the bottle, an audio clip of the soundtrack played via embedded chip, and a scratch and sniff area diffusing the drink's scent. The company had also envisioned an interactive website as part of the campaign that would allow viewers to remix Siraisi's soundtrack, but it was never developed. Ethnomusicologist Mark Laver argues that the campaign was intended to target a young and specifically African American clientele.

The campaign was noted for its similarities with rival Coca-Cola's own contemporaneous jazz branding. Around the same time, Coca-Cola had donated $10 million to Jazz at Lincoln Center (J@LC) for construction of a new building and education programs in a new performance space, then called Dizzy's Club Coca-Cola. Pepsi brand manager Lauren Scott claimed that the two campaigns were unrelated.

== Discontinuation ==
PepsiCo shut down the Pepsi Jazz website in May 2008. It had been discontinued by that time after poor sales and the greater success of another flanker, Pepsi Max, which launched in North America in 2007.

== In popular culture ==
Pepsi Jazz is mentioned in the motion picture The Promotion as John C. Reilly is setting up a soda display.

== Ingredients ==
Black Cherry and French Vanilla

- Carbonated water
- Caramel Color
- Natural and artificial flavors
- Phosphoric acid
- Aspartame
- Potassium benzoate (preserves freshness)
- Citric acid
- Potassium citrate
- Caffeine
- Acesulfame potassium
- Calcium disodium EDTA (to protect flavor)

== See also ==
- List of defunct consumer brands
- List of Pepsi types
