= Fresca =

Branded diet citrus soft drink

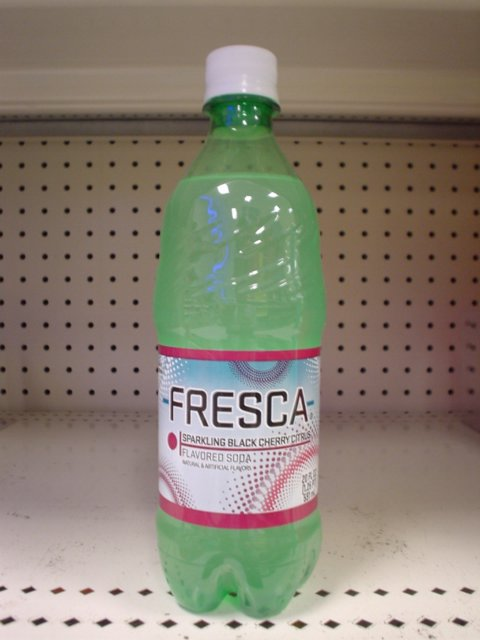
- Type: Soft drink
- Manufacturer: The Coca-Cola Company
- Origin: United States
- Introduced: 1966
- Flavor: Grapefruit Citrus, Black Cherry Citrus, Peach Citrus, and Blackberry Citrus
- Variants: Fresca 1
- Website: www.fresca.com

Fresca is a grapefruit-flavored citrus soft drink created by the Coca-Cola Company. Borrowing the word fresca (meaning "fresh") from Italian, Spanish, and Portuguese, it was introduced in the United States in 1966. Originally a bottled sugar-free diet soda, sugar sweetened versions were introduced in some markets.

Fresca is now sold in multiple flavors: grapefruit citrus (the original flavor), black cherry citrus, peach citrus, and blackberry citrus.

Fresca also entered the cocktail space in 2022 with a line of ready-to-drink canned cocktails (5% ABV), produced in partnership with Constellation Brands. Fresca Mixed is a vodka spritz with 100 calories per can and no added sugar.

== History ==
=== Trademarks ===
According to the United States Patent and Trademark Office, "Fresca" was first trademarked by the Coca-Cola Company in July 1962 as a trade name for "frozen concentrated orange juice" and "frozen concentrated tangerine juice". The company also applied for a trademark for "Fresca" in 1962 as a "Non-alcoholic Maltless Soft Drink and the Syrups for Preparing Soft Drinks". In 1969, the company applied for a trademark for "Fresca" as a trade name for "soft drinks and syrups and concentrates for making same".

=== Fresca as a soft drink ===
The Coca-Cola Company described the original Fresca soft drink formula as "a citrus-based, sugar free product - a soft drink, a low-calorie beverage, a mixer, all in one" and said the Fresca name was picked because the word is "short, memorable and distinctive". Fresca was the second artificially sweetened, low-calorie product launched by the Coca-Cola Company. Coca-Cola's Tab, an artificially sweetened, low-calorie cola made its debut in 1963.

Fresca competed primarily against Squirt.

=== Test marketing ===
Coca-Cola began limited test marketing of Fresca in 1964. 1965 saw expanded test marketing in Providence, Rhode Island, and Seattle-Tacoma, Washington. It was also advertised for sale in Michigan and Ohio in late 1965.

=== Introduction ===
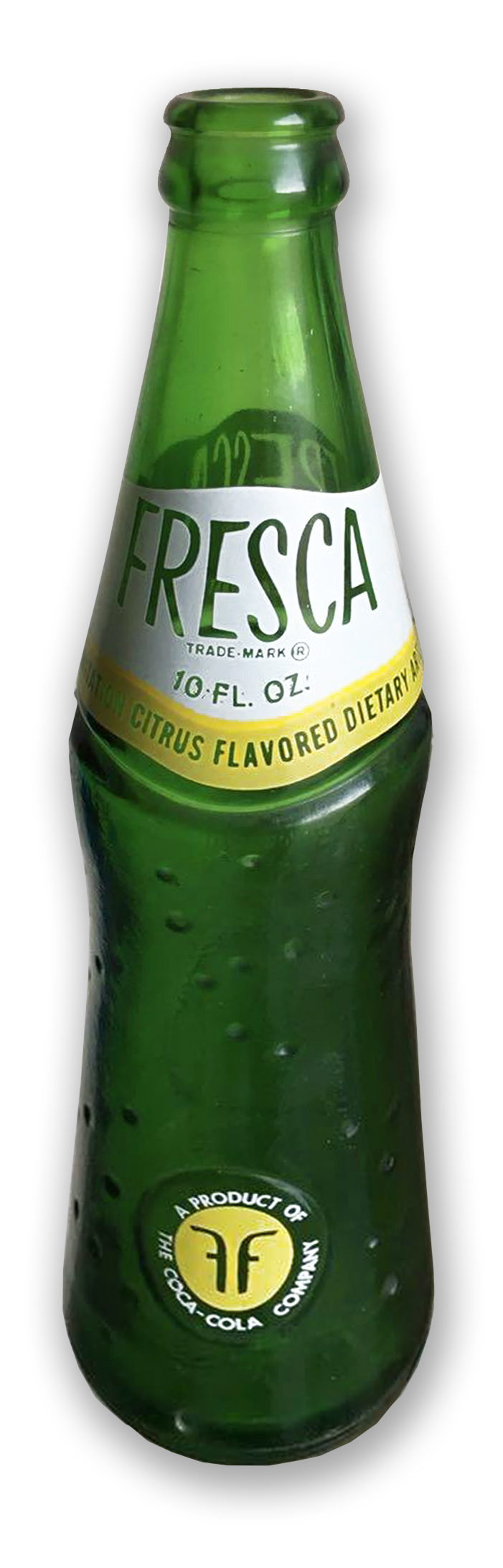
The original Fresca bottle design from 1966, designed by Hodgman-Bourke of New York City

Fresca was introduced across the United States and in international markets in 1966.

Since its introduction, Fresca has been marketed in the United States as a sugar-free, citrus (lime and grapefruit) flavored diet soft drink. In 1966 then Coca-Cola Company president J. Paul Austin announced the company's profits had doubled since 1959 and said "Other developments, notably the introduction of Fresca, now underway, promise further advancement in the refreshment industry".

Multiple references in contemporary newspapers and Coca-Cola corporate websites refer to a wide 1966 US and international rollout of the Fresca soft drink brand. (Note: A single entry on one Coca-Cola website erroneously refers to a 1958 introduction of Fresca in the United States. There are no newspaper articles or media references that support that date.)

In 1967 Larrie L. Isenring, general manager of the Coca-Cola Bottling Company of Madison (Wisconsin) said the "newly introduced Fresca and pre-brewed coffee were the company's fastest growing products".

Sales of Fresca quickly exploded. By March 1967, Merrill Lynch, Pierce, Fenner & Smith Inc. forecast increasing profits for Coca-Cola, saying "we believe Fresca... may be the nation's number three soft drink by the end of the year".

In 1968, it was introduced into the Australian market under the name Tresca, where it was solidly marketed as a diet drink.

By 1969, Fresca had the highest market share of all artificially sweetened soft drinks in America.

=== Original bottle design ===
Fresca was originally sold in 10 ounce bottles designed by the industrial design firm Hodgman-Bourke of New York, New York. The green glass bottle featured a groove under the logo panel designed to catch condensation from the top half of the bottle. Dimples on the bottle's lower half were meant to represent bubbles from the soda's carbonation.

== Initial marketing campaign ==
=== "Blizzard of Flavor" ===
F. William Free, creative director of the Marschalk Company advertising agency, created the initial marketing campaign for Fresca, branding the soda "the 'Blizzard of Flavor'. Free had earlier orchestrated the introduction of Sprite and Tab for Coca-Cola.

The agency's unifying theme for the brand's marketing centered around Fresca having a "blizzard" of "frosty taste". The soda was said to be "cool, crisp, frosty and refreshing". A 1966 newspaper ad headline read "Here. The frosty taste of Fresca. It's a blizzard". The ad copy used 25 adjectives to describe Fresca's "blizzard taste".

=== National newspaper introduction advertising ===
The "Blizzard" campaign included a major market, full color pre-print newspaper advertising program reported to have cost "over a million dollars" which launched in the spring of 1967. The campaign consisted of three successive themes. The first was "Blizzard Kickoff", aimed at supporting the local introduction of Fresca by regional bottlers, the second was "Fresca and Sherbet" which explained how to use Fresca and other food ingredients for snacks and drinks. The third was named "Blizzard Girls" which featured "The Fresca Girls", models dressed in fur-trimmed parkas with hoods, photographed drinking Fresca in falling snow while riding a zebra, a miniature car, a Vespa scooter and walking a Saint Bernard. The campaign achieved some of the highest levels of consumer awareness for any consumer product at that time.

=== Musical theme song ===
The marketing campaign included a theme song "The Blizzard Song", written by Gary McFarland which was recorded by Mitch Miller and Trini Lopez. Both versions were used in TV ads for Fresca and were also issued as a four-song 45 rpm record.

The Miller record "Mitch Miller – Singin' Up A Blizzard", featured a sleeve printed with the slogan "Hey gang, sing up a blizzard with us! Mitch". The reverse of the sleeve featured a headline "Have a Singing, Swing Blizzard of a Party With Fresca" and included recipes of food and mixed drinks that used Fresca as an ingredient. The Miller record was used in a promotion campaign which encouraged consumers to save Fresca bottle caps and redeem them for a copy of the record.

The Lopez record "Trini Lopez – Sings His Greatest Hits" featured three songs from Lopez' repertoire as well as his version of McFarland's "The Blizzard Song". This record was issued with a printed sleeve with an ad on the back that said "The frosty taste of Fresca. It's a blizzard!" The sleeve had a flap with a die-cut hole and was hung from a bottle in six and eight-pack bottle cartons of Fresca. The record was included at no charge.

=== New York City marketing launch and blizzard ===
F. William Free orchestrated an elaborate formal marketing debut on February 7, 1967, held at the Four Seasons Restaurant in New York city's Seagram's building. The fountain in the middle of the restaurant was frozen, and six "Fresca bottles", women who wore replicas of the top half of Fresca bottles covering their head to their waists skated and danced through the night while the Mitch Miller Orchestra entertained guests with the Fresca "Blizzard Theme" and other hits.

The "Blizzard" campaign capitalised on an unexpected marketing opportunity when New York City received a foot of snow the day after the Four Seasons premiere. Free used the snowstorm to promote the new brand, appearing in photographs holding a bottle of Fresca. The images were featured in full-page newspaper advertisements in New York with the headline "New York – We're Sorry".

== Notable Fresca fans ==
U.S. President Lyndon B. Johnson was known to greatly enjoy Fresca, which was introduced late in his term.

Bravo network television host Andy Cohen often drinks a "Frequila" during his show. The cocktail is a mixture of Fresca and tequila.

David Plotz, former editor of online magazine Slate and founder and CEO of the local-news podcast network City Cast, is said to be "a hard-core addict of the citrus-flavored soft drink" Fresca.

Fresca is prominently featured in the superhero television series The Boys, where it is the favored drink of the cultish Church of the Collective, leading to fan speculation as to its potential meaning. It was eventually revealed that the show's writers found it "hilarious" that cult members would drink Fresca, and it just became a running gag with no deeper meaning.

== Formula changes ==
Fresca was originally marketed in the United States as a sugar-free, citrus (lime and grapefruit) flavored diet soft drink.

Fresca has undergone several major ingredient and formula changes since its introduction. Fresca was originally sweetened with cyclamates which were banned by the FDA in 1969. They were replaced with saccharin and in turn, they were replaced by NutraSweet-brand aspartame.

According to the Coca-Cola Company, in 1980 an improved Fresca formulation, supported by new packaging, brand graphics and advertising, reached full national availability. The brand refresh was supported by "the most extensive sampling program ever conducted for a soft drink product". Around the time of the 2005 Fresca redesign, acesulfame potassium was added as a secondary sweetener.

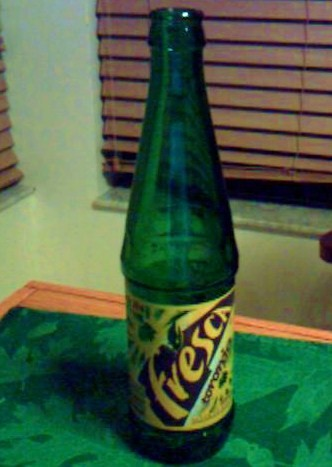
2006 Mexican glass Fresca bottle (355 ml)

Coca-Cola marketed a sugar sweetened version of Fresca in Latin America. In 1997, the Coca-Cola Company responded to requests for this product from immigrant communities by launching it throughout the US as Citra. This was a success but is instead sold as the Citrus flavor in Coca-Cola's Fanta line in areas with large Hispanic populations. In Colombia and Argentina sweetened Fresca is called Quatro and marketed using Fresca's colors and logos.

Fresca was made available in South Africa during the early 1990s with a series of colorful ads featuring British-Nigerian actor Hakeem Kae-Kazim with the slogan "Nothing tastes like Fresca". The soft drink developed a cult following but sales were discontinued.

== Packaging changes ==
Fresca packaging has been redesigned several times. In 2005, Coca-Cola gave Fresca a more contemporary look, Fresca's first packaging makeover since 1995. During this redesign, two new flavors were introduced (Sparkling Peach Citrus and Sparkling Black Cherry Citrus) and the original grapefruit flavor was renamed Sparkling Citrus. Later, "Sparkling" was dropped and the original flavor was renamed Original Citrus. Several additional flavors were added to the line-up after 2005, but those flavors were dropped.

Coca-Cola announced revamped packaging again in 2018 along with a new marketing campaign targeted towards millennials – the first Fresca advertising since 2008 – with the stated intention of "reeling in a new generation of drinkers unfamiliar with the brand". The marketing described it as a "sparkling flavored soda", meant to compete with other sparkling beverage products such as La Croix and Izze.

In 2018, Fresca also rebranded itself as "Fresca Sparkling Soda Water", reformulated in four flavors, Grapefruit Citrus, Black Cherry Citrus, Peach Citrus and Blackberry Citrus and described as "The original no sugar, no calorie sparkling beverage". In the US, Fresca is currently sold in plastic bottles and aluminum cans.

== Ingredients ==
=== Fresca Grapefruit Citrus ===
United States

- Carbonated water
- Citric acid
- Natural and artificial flavors
- Potassium citrate
- Concentrated grapefruit juice
- Aspartame
- Potassium sorbate (to protect taste)
- Acesulfame potassium
- Acacia gum
- Potassium benzoate (to protect taste)
- Glycerol ester of wood rosin
- Calcium disodium EDTA (to protect taste)
- Carob bean gum

Canadian

- Carbonated water
- Citric acid
- Natural flavour
- Sodium citrate
- Aspartame
- Acesulfame-potassium
- Potassium sorbate
- Salt
- Sodium benzoate
- Tartrazine

== See also ==
- Grapefruit–drug interactions

== Notes ==
The U.S. version contains concentrated grapefruit juice, while the Canadian version does not.
