= Topsia Cola =

Cola-flavoured soft drink

- Type: Soft drink
- Manufacturer: Damavand Mineral Water Co.
- Origin: Iran
- Flavour: Cola

Topsia Cola (Persian: تاپسیا کولا) is a cola-flavoured soft drink produced in Iran by Damavand Mineral Water Co.
