= Merrydown =

Brand of cider manufactured in the UK

Merrydown plc
- Formerly: Merrydown Wine plc (1946-1993)
- Founded: 1946; 80 years ago
- Headquarters: Manderson House, 5230 Valiant Court, Delta Way, Brockworth, Gloucestershire, United Kingdom
- Website: www.merrydown.co.uk

Merrydown is a brand of cider manufactured in the UK. It was originally brewed at Horam Manor near Heathfield, East Sussex, England by the Merrydown brewery.

The company was founded by 3 friends, Jack Ward, John Kelland-Knight and Ian Howie in 1946. They each put up £100 to turn Jack's wine making hobby into a business. The Merrydown enterprise, named after Jack's house, was underway. The very first batch of Merrydown Apple Wine was fermented from 450 gallons of apple juice using a 300-year-old oak cider press borrowed from a local farmer and within a year the scale of production had outgrown Mr Ward's garage at his home in Rotherfield and the partners bought Horam Manor nine years later, with seven acres of land. By 1955, production had risen to 400,000 gallons.

During the 1980s the cider was sold in 1 litre bottles as either dry (silver label) or sweet (gold label) and had an ABV of 8.2%. However, during the late 1990s the strength was reduced to 7.5% due to potential excess duty costs. The cider (along with the brewery) was acquired by The SHS Group in 2005. The SHS Group is a privately owned £400m food and drink company, based in Belfast, who also market Shloer, bottlegreen and WKD.

In 2004, Merrydown decided to close its factory and contract out production to other cider manufacturers.

Merrydown is available in 750ml glass bottles as well as 440ml cans and 500ml bottles. All Merrydown is still made to the original recipe first developed by the founders back in 1946 and uses eating and culinary apples which gives it a unique appley taste. All Merrydown cider is free from artificial flavourings and sweeteners and is suitable for vegetarians and vegans and is gluten-free. Instead of using cider yeast, yeast from the champagne-ardennes region is used which is why it is slightly sparkling.
