= A.J. Canfield Company =

Produces and bottles soda beverages

- Industry: Soda Beverage Producer
- Founded: Chicago, Illinois, US (1924)
- Founder: Arthur J. Canfield
- Defunct: 1995
- Fate: Sold to Select Beverages in 1995, which later came under ownership of Keurig Dr Pepper
- Headquarters: Chicago, Illinois, United States
- Area served: US Midwest region
- Products: soft drinks
- Brands: Canfield's Diet Chocolate Fudge; Canfield's 50/50; Canfield's Dry Ginger Ale; Grandpa Graf's; Swiss Creme

The A.J. Canfield Company was a Chicago-based independent producer of carbonated beverages founded in 1924. The company was known during its later years for marketing unusual flavors, including Canfield's Diet Chocolate Fudge; it was sold by the Canfield family in 1995 to Select Beverages.

== History ==
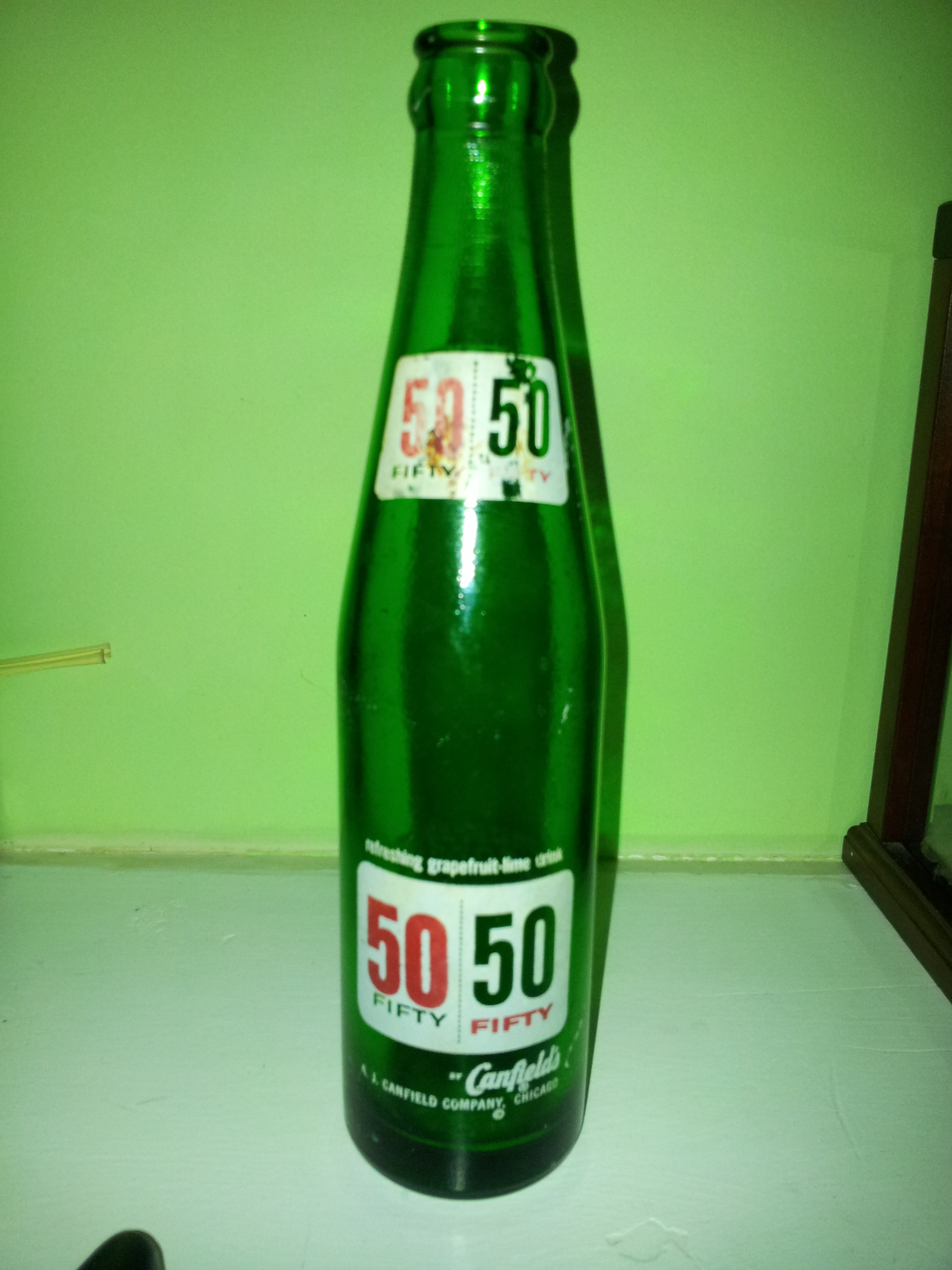
50/50 soda bottle

The company was started in 1924, at 67th Street and South Chicago Avenue in Chicago, Illinois, by Arthur J. Canfield, a former railroad worker.

Canfield's was unique during much of its early history in the marketing approach of using quart glass bottles of a unique design that could be returned only to the Canfield's bottling plant, whereas almost all regional bottlers at the time used generic quart glass bottles with removable paper labels that could be returned to any bottling plant. The company then promoted its beverages and bottles to be of higher quality than other Chicago area soft drink makers. This plan produced mixed results, as some retailers declined to carry Canfield's products to avoid the extra work required to return the bottles. Canfield's also used unique reinforced wooden cases for delivery and return of their quart bottles to help prevent breakage.

Canfield's was a marketer of this unique bottle until the mid-1970s. Around 1976, Canfield's switched to a plastic quart bottle with a unique shape resembling a vintage glass "milk bottle with cream top". This change coincided with Canfield's "Come Taste The Rainbow - Canfield's Rainbow Of Flavor And Fun" advertising campaign. A wide variety of fruit flavored sodas were added to the product line at this time.

Canfield's was a large scale advertiser on WGN-TV until 1995, when the company was sold to Select Beverages. Its largest plant, on the south side of Chicago at East 89th Place, was closed in December 1995.

In 1998, Select Beverages was acquired by the American Bottling Company, a joint venture company owned by Cadbury Schweppes and the Carlyle Group. Ownership would eventually be taken over by Keurig Dr Pepper.

== Products ==
- Canfield's 50/50 was a grapefruit- and lime-flavored soft drink. In the late 1980s and early 1990s, the 50/50 soft drink brand was bottled at Laurel Packaging, Inc. (now Pepsi Bottling Group), Johnstown, PA. The drink was distributed by the Will G. Keck Corporation (Kecksburg, PA) and also by D & M Management, Inc. (Davidsville, PA), an independent beverage distribution firm, in the West Central Pennsylvania, Maryland, Washington, DC, and the Northern Virginia areas.
- Canfield's Diet Chocolate Fudge
- Canfield's Dry
- Grandpa Graf's
- Swiss Creme Soda
- Mickey Melon, a watermelon drink made in association with Mickey Rooney
- Club soda
- Tonic water
- Anna Banana
- Honee Orange
- Hula Punch
- Red Pop
