= Crusha =

Brand of milkshake

- Type: Milkshake
- Manufacturer: Silver Spoon
- Distributor: British Sugar
- Origin: United Kingdom, Australia, Spain etc.
- Introduced: 20 December 1955; 70 years ago
- Colour: Dependent on flavour
- Flavour: Various
- Variants: Various
- Related products: Jucee
- Website: crusha.co.uk

Crusha is a brand of milkshake mix, sold in the United Kingdom. The brand first appeared in 1955, and was bought by British Sugar. In December 2001, it came under the Silver Spoon brand.

== History ==
=== Early history ===
Crusha was originally sold in glass bottles, but was later changed to plastic. Crusha is sold in many different flavours, the first four flavours being chocolate, banana, strawberry and raspberry. Flavours like Lemon, Lime and pineapple were also available.

=== 2003 relaunch (2003–2008) ===
In September 2003, Crusha was given a major branding refresh and, for the first time, given a major TV presence. Silver Spoon commissioned web animator Joel Veitch to produce an advert, written by Elaine Jones and Anna Goodyear, that featured cats playing musical instruments, including a ginger cat named Errol singing, and cows getting crushed under bottles of the product. The music for the adverts was provided by Mammoth Music. In October of that year, British Sugar admitted a secret plot to clear faulty milkshakes from Tesco, without telling the company. That year, new flavours Vanilla Ice Cream and Black Cherry were added to the lineup, alongside the returning flavours Lime and Pineapple.

In 2005, Pineapple and Black Cherry were replaced with two new flavours: white chocolate and a tropical fruit variant named "Wild'n'Fruity". In October 2005, No Added Sugar versions of Strawberry and Banana were introduced.

=== 2007 refresh (2007–2011) ===
In April 2007, Crusha rebranded with a new logo and reformulated "Nothing Artificial" flavours, which now consisted of Raspberry, Strawberry, Banana, Chocolate and White Chocolate. In August 2007, after receiving thousands of complaints from dismayed customers about the wildly different taste of the new 'Nothing Artificial' version of Strawberry Crusha, it was confirmed that they would revert to the old recipe. The white chocolate variety was later discontinued.

In January 2008, alongside a No Added Sugar variation of the Raspberry flavour being introduced, Silver Spoon recommissioned Joel Veitch to produce another advertising campaign for the product. The advert featured Errol (redesigned as a black cat) and his friends exercising in a gym while cows on treadmills get crushed by bottles of the product, before Errol does as well.

In December 2009, after several campaigns, it was announced that Lime Crusha would return, and would do so on 6 March 2010 at Morrisons and Waitrose stores. It rapidly established itself as its highest-selling flavour. Around this time, a new advert was produced featuring Errol rollerskating with his friends inside the gym, before a bottle of the product crushes him again.

=== Expansion to desserts (2011–2014) ===
In 2011, the Crusha brand was extended to a range of desserts, including Puddings and Jelly. The Milkshake Mix was rebranded as Crusha Mixa, and the Vanilla flavour returned as a limited Edition flavour entitled Vanilla Ice Cream. Banana Crusha was discontinued in shops, but remained a bulk product for cash and carry stores.

For 2012, a new limited-edition flavour, Cherry and Vanilla, replaced Vanilla Ice Cream. Another advert was broadcast that year, featuring Errol and his cats breakdancing, with cows on skateboards getting crushed by a bottle at the end. In 2013, Apple & Blackcurrant replaced Cherry and Vanilla.

=== Crusha Time (2014–2024) ===
On 5 March 2014, Crusha rebranded fully, scrapping "Errol's Crew" and giving Errol a younger appearance, with kittens doing stunts to make Crusha. The flavour selection rebranded to just Raspberry, Strawberry and Chocolate, with a new No Added Sugar version of the chocolate flavour being introduced.

In 2016, Vanilla returned as a no-added-sugar flavour, without any sugar version.

In 2019, the regular full sugar variants of the drink were discontinued in retail, leaving only the No Added Sugar versions. Banana No Added Sugar also returned to the lineup around this time. A Cookies & Cream flavour was also added as a limited edition.

In 2020, the Lime flavour was reintroduced as a limited-edition product, available in No Added Sugar for the first time.

=== Retro Rebranding (2024-) ===
In April 2024, Silver Spoon rebranded Crusha with a retro-styled "Modern Diner" theme, giving Errol a more gangster-like appearance to appeal to a broader audience. The flavour range was reduced to Strawberry, Chocolate, and the returning Banana, alongside a new Caramel Latte flavour.

== Flavours ==
=== Current ===
Name	Launched	Notes
Crusha Strawberry	unknown	Currently sold as a bulk product in Cash and Carry outlets.
Crusha Raspberry	unknown	Currently sold as a bulk product in Cash and Carry outlets.
Crusha Chocolate	unknown	Currently sold as a bulk product in Cash and Carry outlets.
Crusha Banana	unknown	Currently sold as a bulk product in Cash and Carry outlets.
Crusha Strawberry No Added Sugar	2005	
Crusha Banana No Added Sugar	2005	Was discontinued between 2011 and 2019.
Crusha Chocolate No Added Sugar	2014	
Crusha Caramel Latte No Added Sugar	2024	It is made to simulate the taste and feel of a Caramel Latte, in contrast to the other flavours, which are pure milkshake mixers.
Crusha Caramel Latte	2024	Sold as a bulk product in Cash and Carry outlets.

=== Former ===
Name	Launched	Discontinued
Crusha Lemon	Unknown	Unknown
Crusha Toffee	Unknown	Unknown
Crusha Caramel	Unknown	Unknown
Crusha Pineapple	Unknown; 2003	Unknown; 2004
Crusha Vanilla/Vanilla Ice Cream	1990s 2003; 2011	1990s 2005; 2012
Crusha Lime	2003; 2010	2005; 2012
Crusha Black Cherry	2003	2005
Crusha White Chocolate	2005	2007
Crusha Wild'n'Fruity	2005	2006
Crusha Raspberry No Added Sugar	2008	2020s
Crusha Cherry and Vanilla	2012	2013
Crusha Apple and Blackcurrant	2013	2014
Crusha Vanilla No Added Sugar	2016; 2023	2019; 2024
Crusha Cookies and Cream No Added Sugar	2019	2021
Crusha Lime No Added Sugar	2020	2022
