= Canfield's Diet Chocolate Fudge =

Carbonated soft drink

- Type: Diet soda
- Manufacturer: A.J. Canfield Company; American Bottling Company (Midwest only)
- Distributor: A.J. Canfield Company; Kehe Foods (Midwest only)
- Origin: Elgin, Illinois
- Introduced: 1972
- Color: Caramel
- Flavor: Fudge
- Variants: Diet Cherry Chocolate Fudge; Diet Peanut Chocolate Fudge

Canfield's Diet Chocolate Fudge soda was a zero-calorie, aspartame-sweetened carbonated soft drink canned and distributed by the A.J. Canfield Company of Elgin, Illinois, United States, a division of Select Beverages. Production for the midwestern United States was last handled by the American Bottling Company, a subsidiary of Keurig Dr Pepper and distribution by Kehe Foods of Chicago.

== History ==
=== Beginnings ===
The beverage was introduced in 1972 by 32-year-old Alan B. Canfield, senior vice president of Elgin, Illinois-based A.J. Canfield Beverages, a company founded by his grandfather. Canfield was a regular dieter and chocolate lover, who got the idea the year prior. Canfield brought a two-pound box of fudge to Manny Wesber, the company's chief chemist, asking him if he could re-create the taste in a diet soda.

Wesber succeeded in creating a saccharin-sweetened chemically created concoction, entirely artificially flavored. The drink sold moderately well among Canfield's other brands, with sales remaining steady over the next 13 years. (Note: "Canfield's Diet Chocolate Fudge had been a stable but unimpressive performer, selling 60,000 cases every year for 13 years straight ...")

=== 1984 reintroduction ===
Canfield's Diet Chocolate Fudge was, by this time, sweetened with aspartame. When Chicago Tribune reporter Bob Greene reviewed the product and described it as tasting "like a calorie-free hot fudge sundae", sales quickly went from mediocre to highly successful in the soft drink market.

By 1985, regional bottlers across the United States were seeking franchise rights. With these rights in place, more than 200 million cans of Canfield's Diet Chocolate Fudge soda were sold in 1985. As competition from other makers increased, Canfield's grew more protective of their "Chocolate Fudge" moniker, going so far as to sue rival maker Vess Beverages over their use of the name, "Vess Diet Chocolate Fudge". A federal district court judge ruled in favor of Canfield and issued a preliminary injunction disallowing the use of the word "fudge" on their packaging. Though the injunction was later overturned, the case, known as Canfield v. Honickman, continues to be used as an example during the study of trademark product law.

Spinoffs proved less successful. The year 1987 saw the introduction of "Diet Cherry Chocolate Fudge" and "Diet Peanut Chocolate Fudge", both of which are still sold today in limited numbers.

=== Sale of brand ===
In 1995, the A.J. Canfield Company was sold to Select Beverages for an undisclosed sum. The company's plant in Elgin, which had been operating since the 1930s, closed the following year. Production of the Diet Chocolate Fudge drinks was moved to another plant.

Canfield's was acquired by Select Beverages in 1995, that was later acquired by the American Bottling Company and eventually by Keurig Dr. Pepper. The company's Chicago plant was closed in 1995, and as of 2022, Keurig Dr. Pepper no longer produces Canfield's Diet Chocolate Fudge or any of Canfield's other products.

== See also ==
- Diet food
- List of chocolate drinks
