= Shloer =

Grape-based soft drink sold in the UK and Ireland

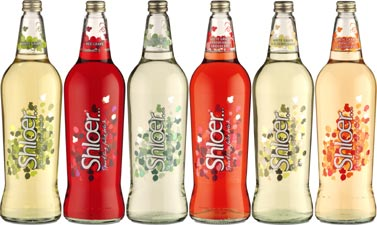
Shloer Range

Shloer (/ʃlɜːr/) is a line of soft drinks containing grape juice, available in the United Kingdom and Ireland. Unlike most soft drinks, it is marketed towards adults exclusively.

It is made by Merrydown PLC, and available in nine flavours – red grape, white grape, apple and white grape, white grape and elderflower, raspberry, cranberry, rosé, mango and passionfruit, and strawberry punch.

To avoid incurring a higher sales cost from new sugary drinks taxes introduced in 2018 in the UK and Ireland, the drinks were reformulated to include the artificial sweetener Sucralose.

Slogans of the drinks include "Shloer, The Grown-Up Soft Drink" and "Get your sparkle!". The current slogan is "Best Served Shared".

The name "Shloer" is derived from the Swiss brewer Jules Schlör.

An alcoholic red grape version called "Shloer Nuveau" in the 1990s was discontinued. In order to strengthen Shloer's position as an adult soft drink alternative to alcoholic beverages, SHS Drinks came out in 2019 with two new drink ranges "Spritzed" and "Pressed", with Spritzed intending to be ‘an alternative to the likes of gin & tonic’, and Pressed as an 'alcohol-free rival to flavoured cider'. Spritzed is sold in a glass bottle, while Pressed is sold in a can.
