= Seaman's Beverages =

Canadian beverage company (1939–2002)

Seaman's Beverages Ltd.
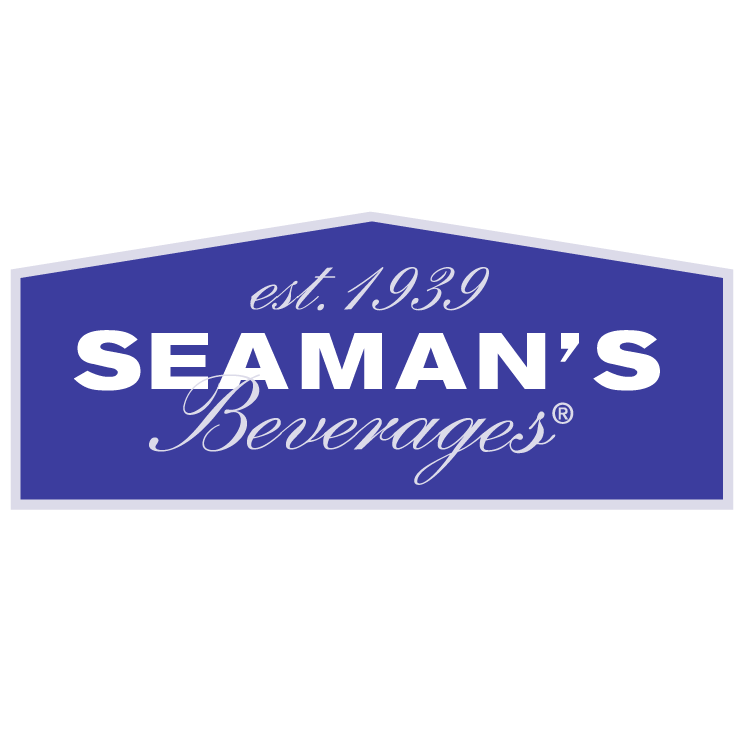
- Industry: Beverage
- Founded: 1939
- Fate: Acquired by The Pepsi Bottling Group. Brand survived while the company was dissolved. Brand discontinued in 2020.
- Headquarters: Charlottetown, Canada
- Area served: The Maritimes, but mostly Prince Edward Island

Seaman's Beverages was a family-run business involved in the manufacturing of carbonated beverages. It was established in 1939 by F.R. Seaman, and operated independently until 2002 where it was sold to The Pepsi Bottling Group. Only two of the beverage flavours survived into the modern era, and the brand was discontinued in 2020.

== History ==
The business was founded in 1939 by F. R. Seaman, after he acquired a loan of $2,500 from one of his cousins. He operated out of an old brick building that also served as his residence in the early years. He delivered soda to local stores in the backseat of his vehicle.

Sometime in the 1960s, Seaman's obtained a license to bottle Pepsi Cola products; as a result, the factory had to be expanded. They were encouraged to stop producing their own brand and exclusively produce Pepsi Cola products; however, they refused, because the Seaman's branded products had always done well. The last owner of the business was Rundell Seaman, who sold the business to The Pepsi Bottling Group in 2002. Before the sale, there was 11 different flavours. The amount was quickly reduced to 4–5, and then only two, which were orange and ginger ale.

The bottling plant in Charlottetown was closed down and converted into a depot for soda produced in Moncton. The Moncton bottling plant took over production for the brand. Before the acquisition, Seaman's products were sold around the Maritimes, Toronto, and Montreal. Before the brand was discontinued, it was mostly sold in Prince Edward Island, but they could occasionally be found elsewhere in the Maritimes. Pepsi distribution on Prince Edward Island was managed by a local company, and the depot was occupied by a local food products supplier.

In 2010, The Pepsi Bottling Group and PepsiAmericas were purchased by PepsiCo. In early 2020, Pepsi discontinued the brand due to low demand.

== Flavours ==
Over its history, the company has produced a range of flavours, including:

- Olde Fashioned Orange
- Diet Orange with Sucralose
- Cream Soda
- Ginger Ale
- Ginger Brew
- Birch Beer
- Grapefruit and Lime
- Lime Rickey
- Root Beer

Ginger Ale and Orange were the only flavours available when the brand was discontinued.
