= Barrelhead Root Beer =

Brand of root beer

Barrelhead Root Beer is a brand of root beer that used to be manufactured by Dr Pepper Snapple Group, but the Barrelhead name was re-launched in September 2016 as a new product by Barrelhead Ventures LLC, a Pennsylvania-based company, but no connection with the original name and formula and company.

Canada Dry introduced Barrelhead as a new brand of root beer in the Summer of 1971, with the brand last being advertised in 1993. Barrelhead went into the test market in 1971 in Buffalo and was then introduced into Boston, Providence, R. I., all of Maine, and Utica, N.Y.

It was originally marketed as "draft style" root beer. One of their marketing points was the flavor, which was said to be strong enough to stand up to a mug full of ice without becoming watered down. The "jingle" on their radio commercials was, "For old fashioned flavor, take our advice, drink Barrelhead root beer, and don't spare the ice, 'cause it's real draft style root beer, with real draft style foam, 'cause Barrelhead has, Barrelhead has brought homestyle root beer home!"

In September 2016, at the Atlantic City Seafood Festival, Barrelhead Ventures re-launched the soft drink brand.
