= Ricqlès =

Ricqlès is a French manufacturing products based on peppermint.

== History ==
The Ricqlès brand originated in 1838, when Heyman de Ricqlès, a silk merchant based in Lyon with a passion for botany, developed a distillation process for peppermint leaves, enabling the extraction of an essential oil. Combined with alcohol and purified water, this preparation became known as Ricqlès peppermint cure. Initially used within the family, the product was valued for its refreshing properties, particularly for breath freshening, as well as for digestive discomfort, nausea, headaches, and its antiseptic properties. It was gradually commercialised in pharmacies in Lyon in the form of small sealed glass bottles.

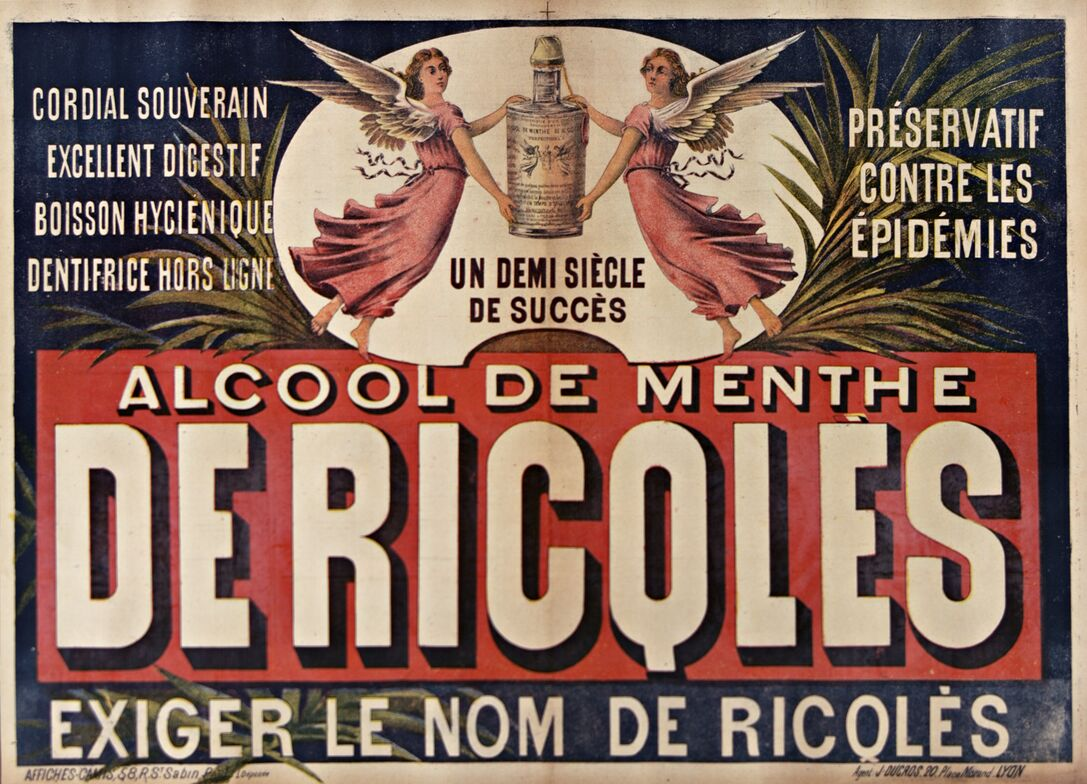
Early advertisements for Ricqlès peppermint cure.

From the mid-19th century onwards, production expanded and commercialisation extended beyond Lyon. The company gradually structured itself through successive patent filings, in 1844 and 1849, as well as the registration of the “Ricqlès” trademark from 1857.

At the end of the 19th century, the company established its main production facilities in the Paris region, in Saint-Ouen, to support its growth. Production increased significantly and the products were distributed both in France and internationally.

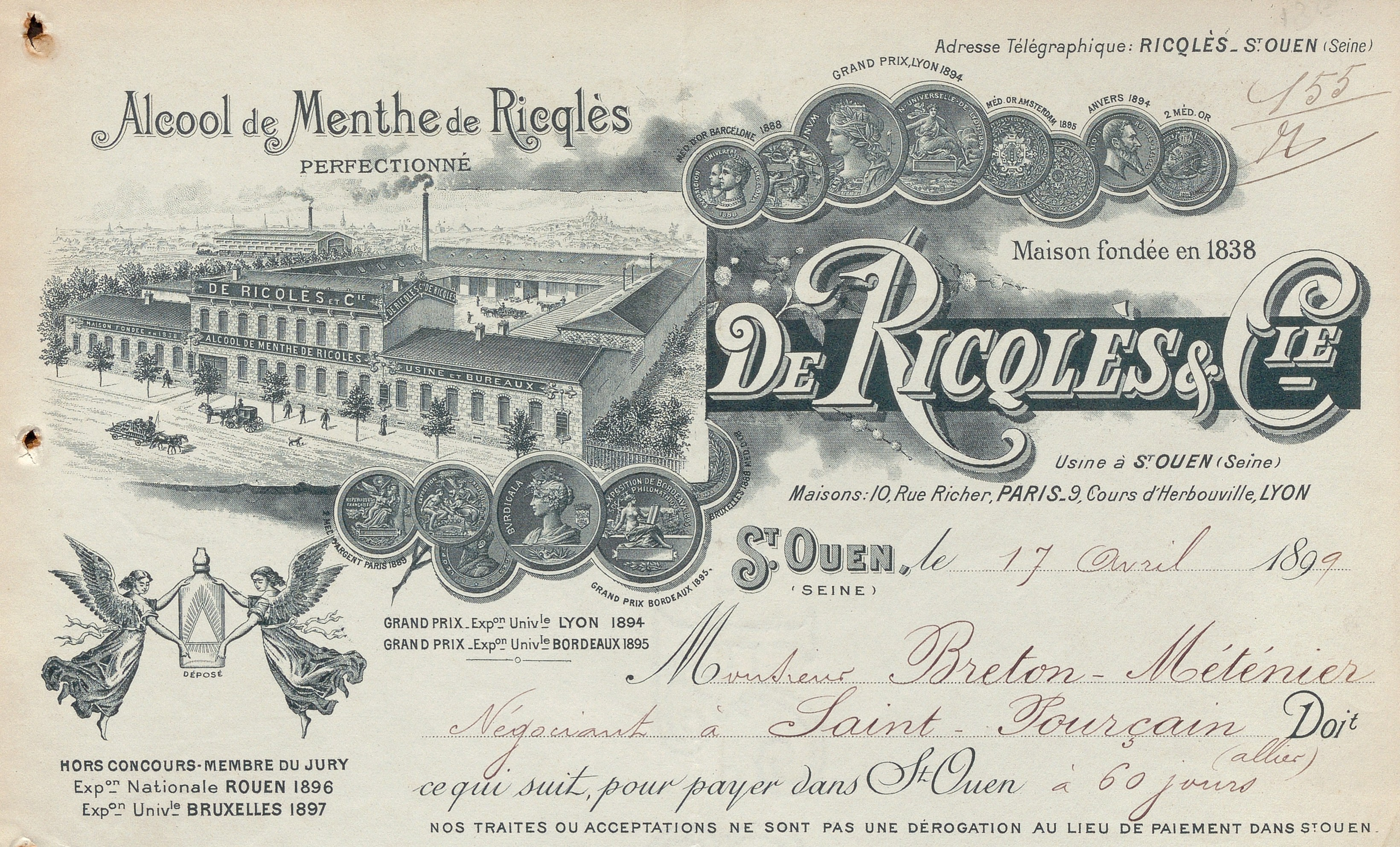
Letterhead depicting the Ricqlès factory on Boulevard Victor-Hugo in Saint-Ouen, 1899.

At the beginning of the 20th century, Ricqlès developed a communication strategy based on illustrated advertising and collaboration with well-known artists. Poster artists such as Leonetto Cappiello, O’Galop and Adrien Barrère contributed to the development of the brand’s visual identity. The slogan “la menthe forte qui réconforte” (“strong mint that comforts”), introduced in the 1930s, also helped strengthen its recognition among consumers.

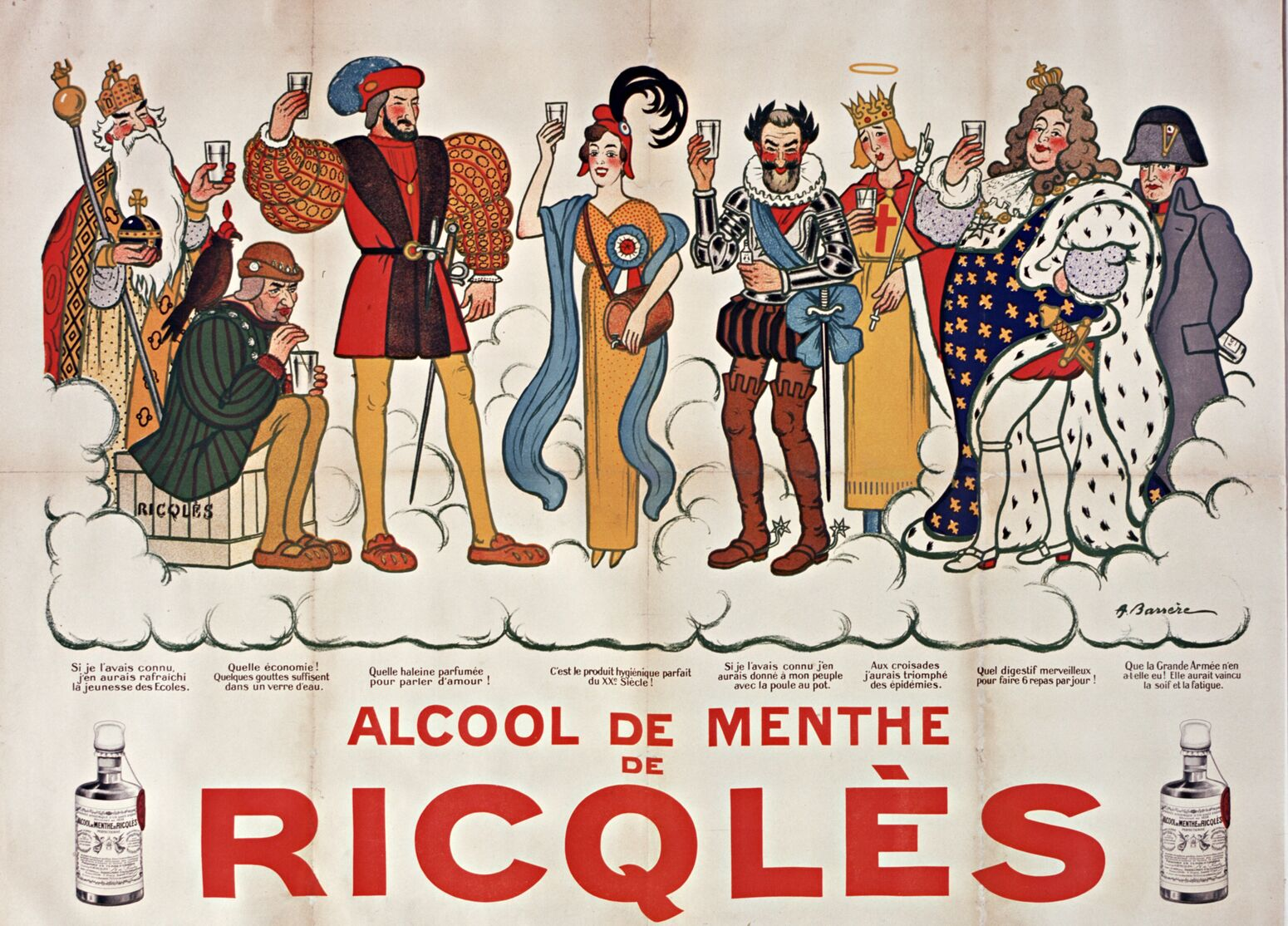
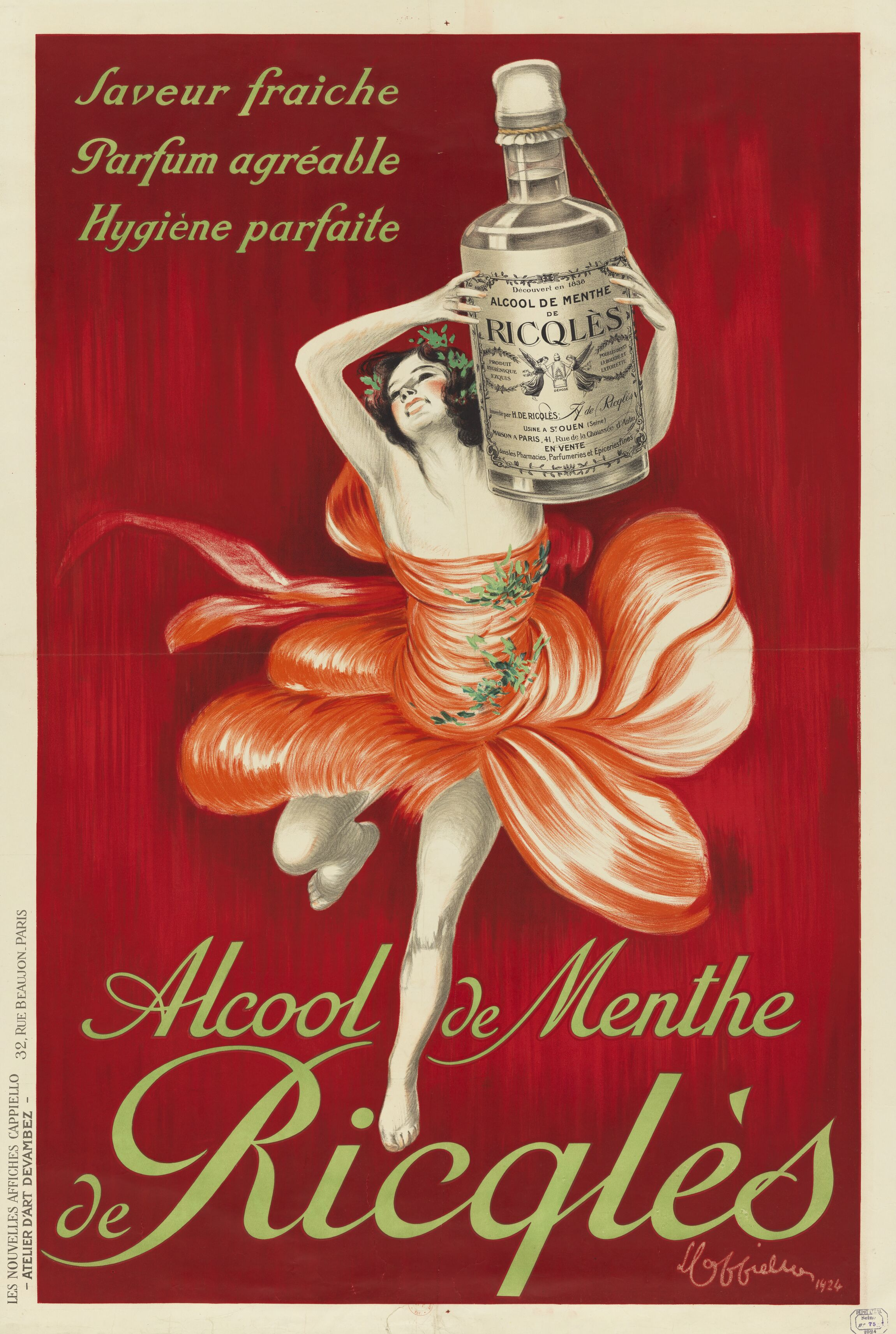
Ricqlès advertising posters from the early 20th century.

At the same time, the brand increased its visibility through events and partnerships. It was associated with sporting events and took part several times in the Tour de France during the 1950s.

After the Second World War, the company modernised its facilities and adapted its positioning to changing consumer habits. From the 1950s and 1960s onwards, it diversified its offering by developing a range of mint-based products, including lozenges and refreshing sprays.

Throughout the 20th century, Ricqlès established itself as a brand associated with mint and freshness, while continuing its industrial and commercial development in France and internationally.
