= Quatro (drink) =

Fruit-flavoured carbonated drink

- Type: Soft drink
- Manufacturer: The Coca-Cola Company
- Origin: United Kingdom
- Introduced: 1982

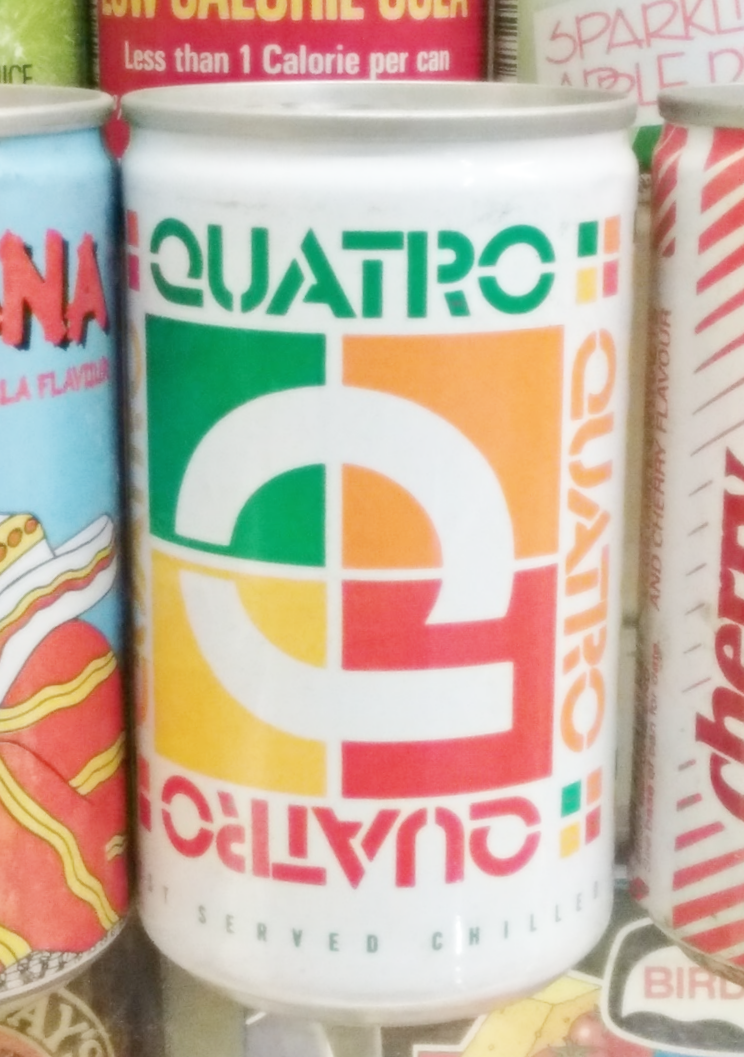
From Museum of Brands, Packaging and Advertising

Quatro was a canned, fruit-flavoured carbonated drink produced from 1982 to 1989 in the United Kingdom. From 1983 to 1989 it was commonly available in the UK, though production and sale of the drink ceased there in 1989. Green in colour, its name derived from the four fruits used: pineapple, orange, passion fruit and grapefruit.

The current incarnation of the Quatro brand has been sold and marketed in South America by The Coca-Cola Company, since 1996. It is grapefruit-flavoured, and is sold in Argentina, Chile, Colombia and Uruguay.

== The TV commercials ==
In 1984, the advertising agency Kirkwood and Partners was briefed to create a TV commercial for Quatro, and following several rounds of research, a script created by Colin Underhay (art director) and Alex Pearl (copywriter) entitled 'Machine' that featured a futuristic vending machine malfunctioning, went into production. Annabel Jankel and Rocky Morton from Cucumber Studios were briefed to create a commercial that fused live action with state-of-the art computer animation. The pair had already won plaudits for their pop videos for artists including Elvis Costello, Talking Heads and Miles Davis. To create the best effects, Jankel and Morton approached Sogitec in France to create the animation for the interior of the machine. Sogitec, the subsidiary of Dassault Aviation was at that time a leading light in flight simulation creation. The lively sound track was scored by Intaferon the short-lived English new wave duo consisting of Simon Fellowes and Simon Gillham.
