= Volvic (mineral water) =

French brand of mineral water

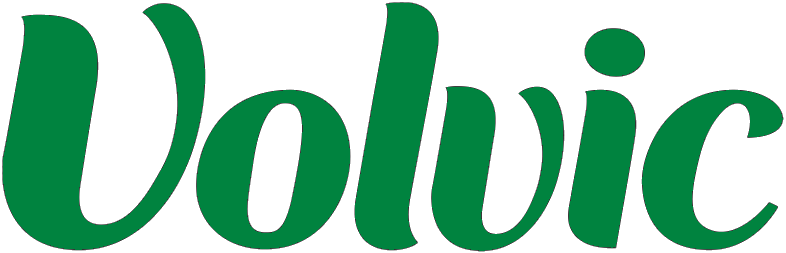

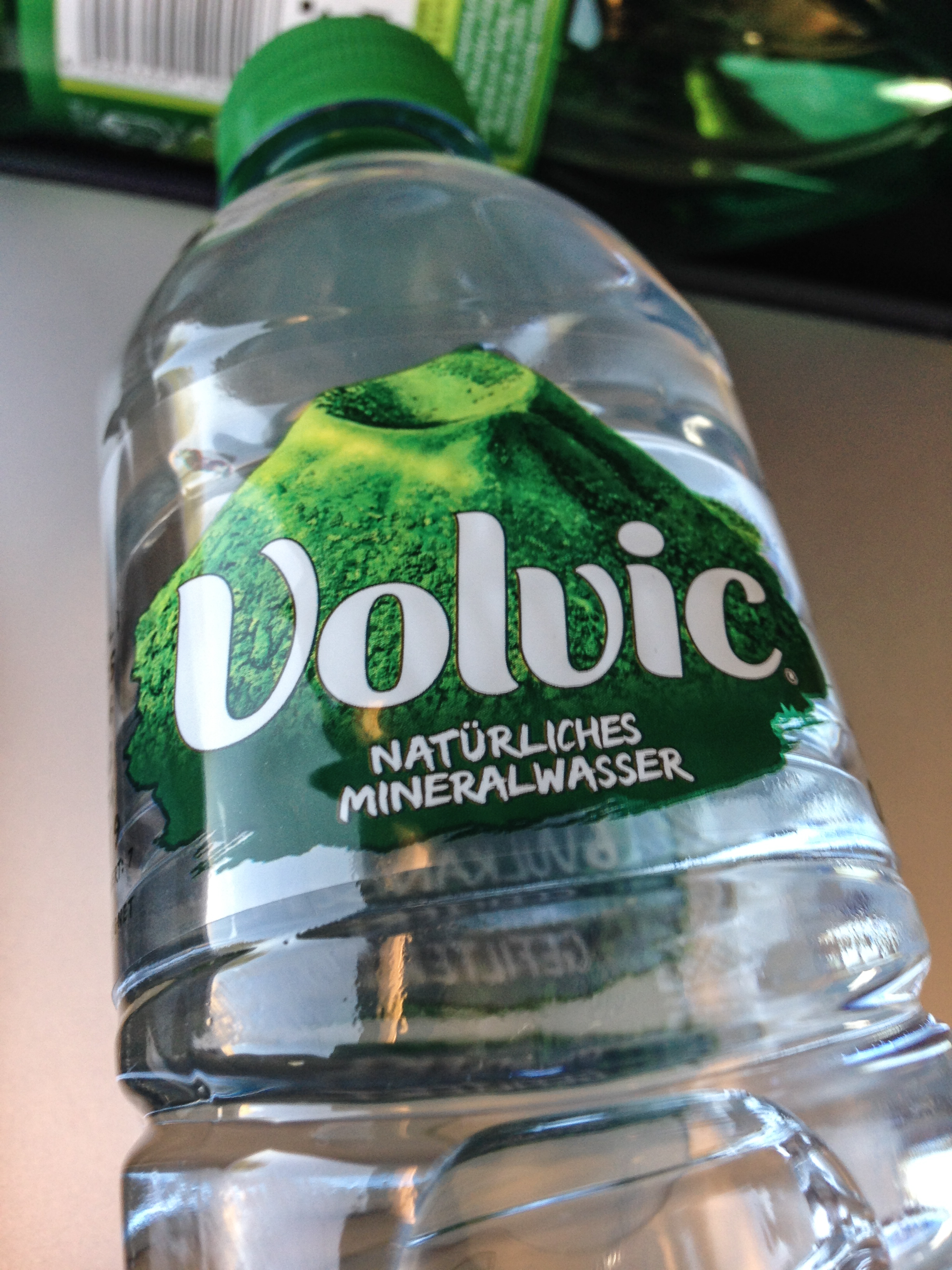
- A 1l bottle of Volvic
- Country: France
- Produced by: Danone (1993–pres.)
- Introduced: 1938; 88 years ago
- Source: Chaîne des Puys, France
- Type: Mineral water
- pH: 7 (neutral)
- Calcium (Ca): 12 - 11.5
- Chloride (Cl): 15
- Bicarbonate (HCO_{3}): 74 - 71
- Magnesium (Mg): 8
- Nitrate (NO_{3}): 7.3
- Potassium (K): 6
- Silica (SiO_{2}): 32 - 31.7
- Sodium (Na): 12 - 11.6
- TDS: 109 (dry residue 130)
- Website: volvic.com
- All concentrations in milligrams per liter (mg/L); pH without units

Volvic (French: [vɔlˈvik]) is a French brand of mineral water. Its source is in the Chaîne des Puys-Limagne Fault, Auvergne Volcanoes Natural Regional Park, at the Puy de Dôme in central France.

Over 50% of the production of Volvic water is exported to more than sixty countries throughout the world. Two bottling plants produce over one billion bottles of water annually and are the principal employers of the local Volvic commune.

== History ==
The first of the springs in the area was tapped in 1922, and the first bottles appeared on the market in 1938. In October 1993, the Volvic company was bought by Groupe Danone. Since 1997, Volvic has been using PETE, a recyclable material, to make their bottles.

The company became carbon-neutral during 2020. During the same year Volvic and the esports organisation Berlin International Gaming commenced a partnership.

== Varieties ==
Volvic also produces a range of water that has natural fruit flavouring named Volvic Touch of Fruit, with sugar free options. Recent flavours include strawberry, summer fruits, orange & peach, cherry, and lemon & lime. Other ranges available are Volvic Juiced (water with fruit juice from concentrate), and Volvic Sparkling (sparkling flavoured water similar to Touch of Fruit).

== Advertising campaigns ==
Early televised advertising campaigns for Volvic included a "1L = 10L for Africa" campaign wherein the company promised that for every one litre of Volvic purchased, they would provide ten litres of drinking water through their "well creation" programme with World Vision in Ghana, Malawi, Mali and Zambia.

In 2007, a series of four Volvic television adverts were released featuring a volcano named George (voiced by Matt Berry) and a t-rex named Tyrannosaurus Alan (voiced by Tom Goodman-Hill). They achieved notoriety online and became recognised as an internet meme after a series of fan-edited YouTube Poop videos used the ads as a source material. Despite the popularity of the campaign online, the characters were not used for any subsequent advertising campaigns.

In 2009, Volvic initiated a campaign known as the 14 Day Challenge, in which people are challenged to drink 1.5 litres of Volvic mineral water every day for 14 days, to achieve hydration to the body and mind.

In 2016, Danone paid a seven-figure total to sponsor a programming block on E4 which included the television shows How I Met Your Mother, The Inbetweeners, The Goldbergs and 2 Broke Girls, a series from Guy Martin, a series of The Island and a reality survival series, Eden.

Google would later credit Volvic as a key case study in June 2017 as a business finding success with the YouTube bumper ad format, upon release of Volvic's 'Find Your Volcano' campaign.

== Alzheimer's study ==
A 2006 study found that drinking Volvic could reduce the levels of aluminium in the bodies of people with Alzheimer's disease. There is a link between human exposure to aluminium and the incidence of Alzheimer's disease.

== Sources ==
- "Bottled Water - The Definitive Bottled Water Site". www.bottledwaterweb.com.
- "Advertisement - Danone Water - "New Life"". Volvic, youtube.com. 16 March 2017.
- Upshall, Emma (3 June 2020). "Danone Water - "New Life"". www.foodbev.com.
