= Squirt (drink) =

Grapefruit soft drink

- The logo of Squirt.

- Type: Soft drink
- Manufacturer: Keurig Dr Pepper
- Origin: Phoenix, Arizona, U.S.
- Introduced: 1938; 88 years ago
- Color: Yellow-White
- Flavor: Grapefruit
- Variants: Grapefruit, Grapefruit Zero Sugar, Ruby Red
- Website: squirtsoda.com

Squirt is a caffeine-free, grapefruit-flavored, carbonated soft drink, created in 1938 in Phoenix, Arizona. The brand competed primarily with The Coca-Cola Company's Fresca.

== History ==
Squirt was created by Herb Bishop in 1938, and originally manufactured in Phoenix, Arizona. In 1981, Squirt begun manufacturing in the Beet Sugar Factory in Glendale, Arizona.

In 1941, a little boy mascot known as "Lil' Squirt" was created for marketing the product. Squirt became a popular soft drink in many parts of the United States, especially the West and Southwest. In the 1950s, it became commonly used as a mixer in cocktails.

The Coca-Cola Company introduced a grapefruit-flavored soft drink called Fresca to compete. PepsiCo also briefly sold a drink called Citrus Blast in 2011.

In 1978, Squirt was sold to Michigan bottler Beverage America. In 1986, Squirt was acquired by A&W. In October 1993, A&W Beverages was folded into Cadbury Schweppes.

In May 2008, Cadbury Schweppes spun off Cadbury Schweppes' Americas Beverages into an independent company called the Dr Pepper Snapple Group, and renamed itself to Cadbury plc. Dr Pepper/Seven Up still exists as a trademark and brand name as of 2024.

On July 9, 2018, Keurig acquired the Dr Pepper Snapple Group in an $18.7 billion deal. The combined company was renamed "Keurig Dr Pepper".

== Product line ==
Squirt is naturally flavored but contains less than 2% grapefruit juice. Like many other soft drinks, its packaging has varied over the years.

In 1983, Diet Squirt was introduced and was the first soft drink in the United States to be sweetened with aspartame.

In the mid 1980s, a vitamin-C-enriched Diet Squirt Plus was briefly marketed.

In the early 1990s, Squirt Sorbet, a frozen treat, was offered in Detroit area supermarkets.

Berry-flavored Ruby Red and Diet Ruby Red Squirt have also been introduced. Unlike regular Squirt, Ruby Red Squirt contains caffeine.

In 2008, Squirt Citrus Power was introduced. Unlike regular Squirt, Squirt Citrus Power is caffeinated, lacks concentrated grapefruit juice, and contains taurine and other ingredients similar to an energy drink.
