= Bibo (soft drink) =

Fruit juice-flavored soft drink by the Coca-Cola Company

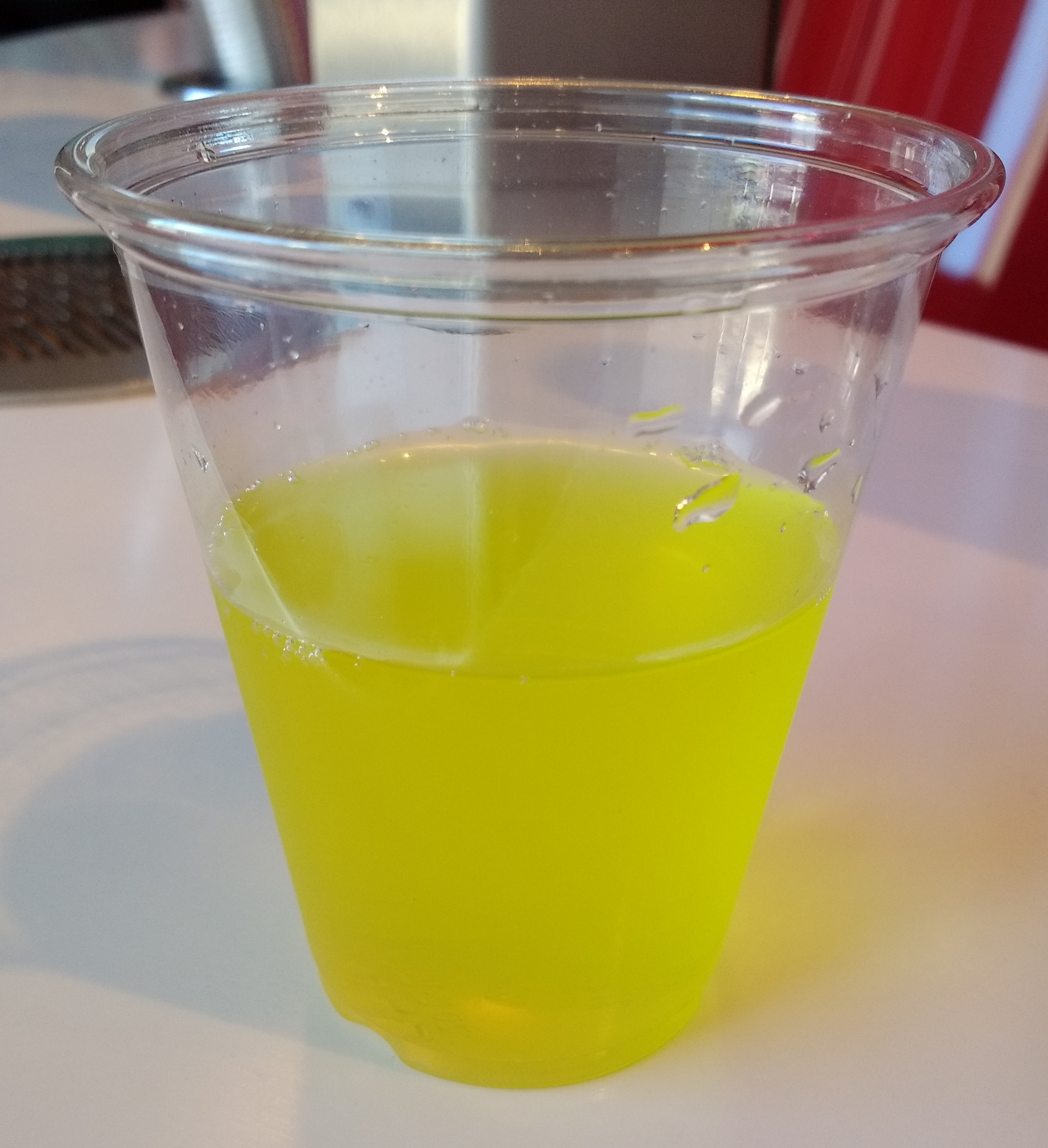
- A cup of Pine-Nut Bibo at the World of Coca-Cola (2017)
- Type: Soft drink
- Manufacturer: The Coca-Cola Company
- Origin: Africa

Bibo is a fruit juice-flavored soft drink introduced in 1998 by the Coca-Cola Company, and sold in Canada, Turkey, South Africa and Mozambique. Bibo was one of a set of regional brands established around the world, including Qoo in Asia, Senzao in Mexico and Kapo in Latin America.

The most popular variety is Bibo Candy Pine-Nut, a mix of pineapple and coconut. Other flavors include Johnny Orange, Paolo Peach, Taka Strawberry, Tiko Lemon, Jay Apple Jr., Jo Grape, Willie Pineapple and DJ Kiwi Mango. Coca-Cola planned to bring Bibo to Eastern Europe, but discontinued the drink in 2004.

In 2007, the World of Coca-Cola museum in Atlanta, Georgia opened a "tasting room" featuring 70 of the company's beverage brands, including Bibo Candy Pine-Nut, as well as the Italian soda Beverly.

In 2013, the Walt Disney World Resort in Orlando, Florida introduced Bibo at the Club Cool refreshment stand at its Epcot theme park, along with other regional Coca-Cola drinks like Thailand's Fanta Melon Frosty and Zimbabwe's Sparberry. After Club Cool left the park, the Coca-Cola Store at Disney Springs continued to offer Bibo drinks until 2020.
