= Guaraná (soft drink) =

Guaraná-flavored soda from Brazil

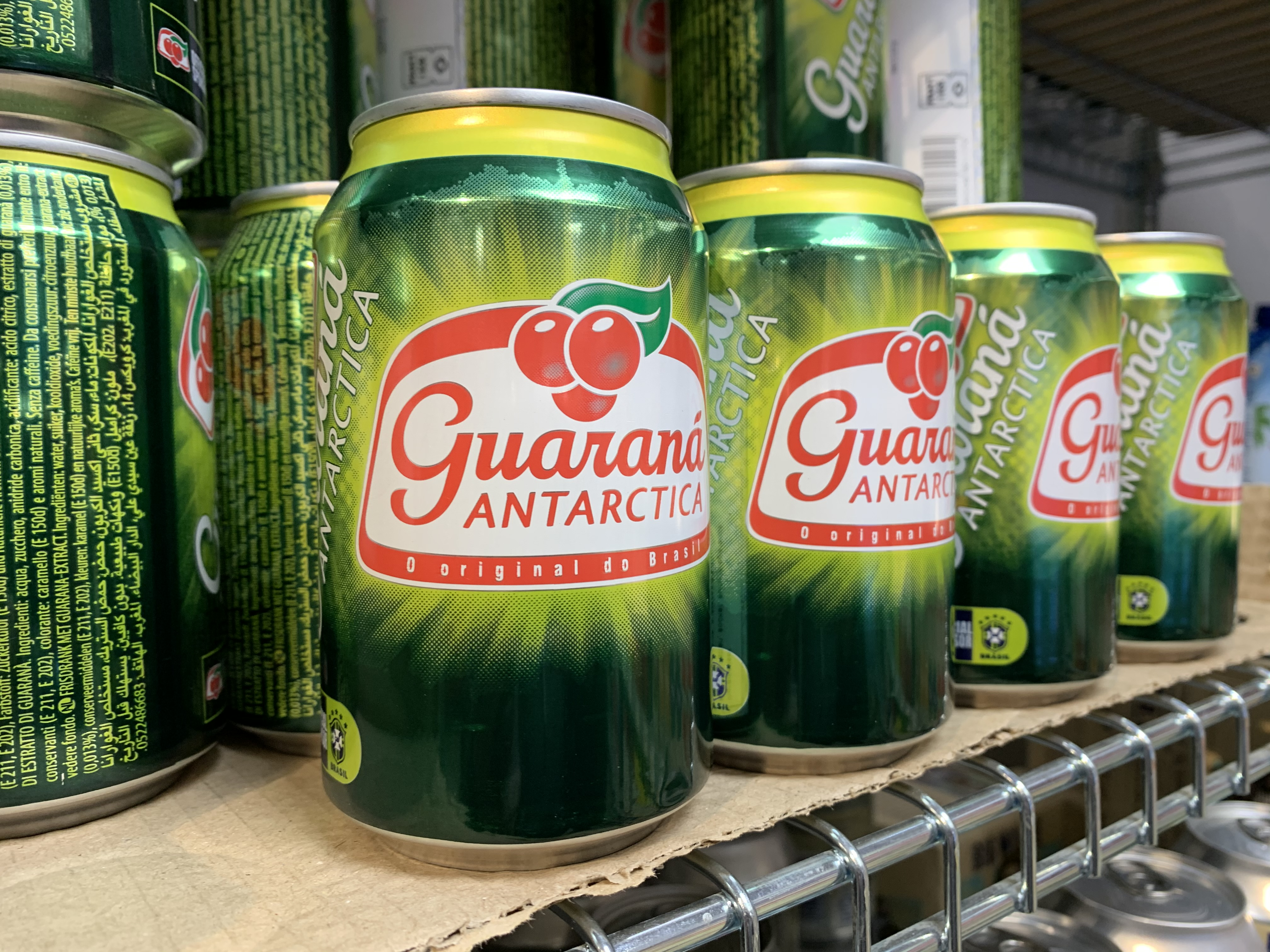
Guaraná Antarctica cans

Guaraná is a Brazilian soft drink originating from the guaraná plant.

== History ==
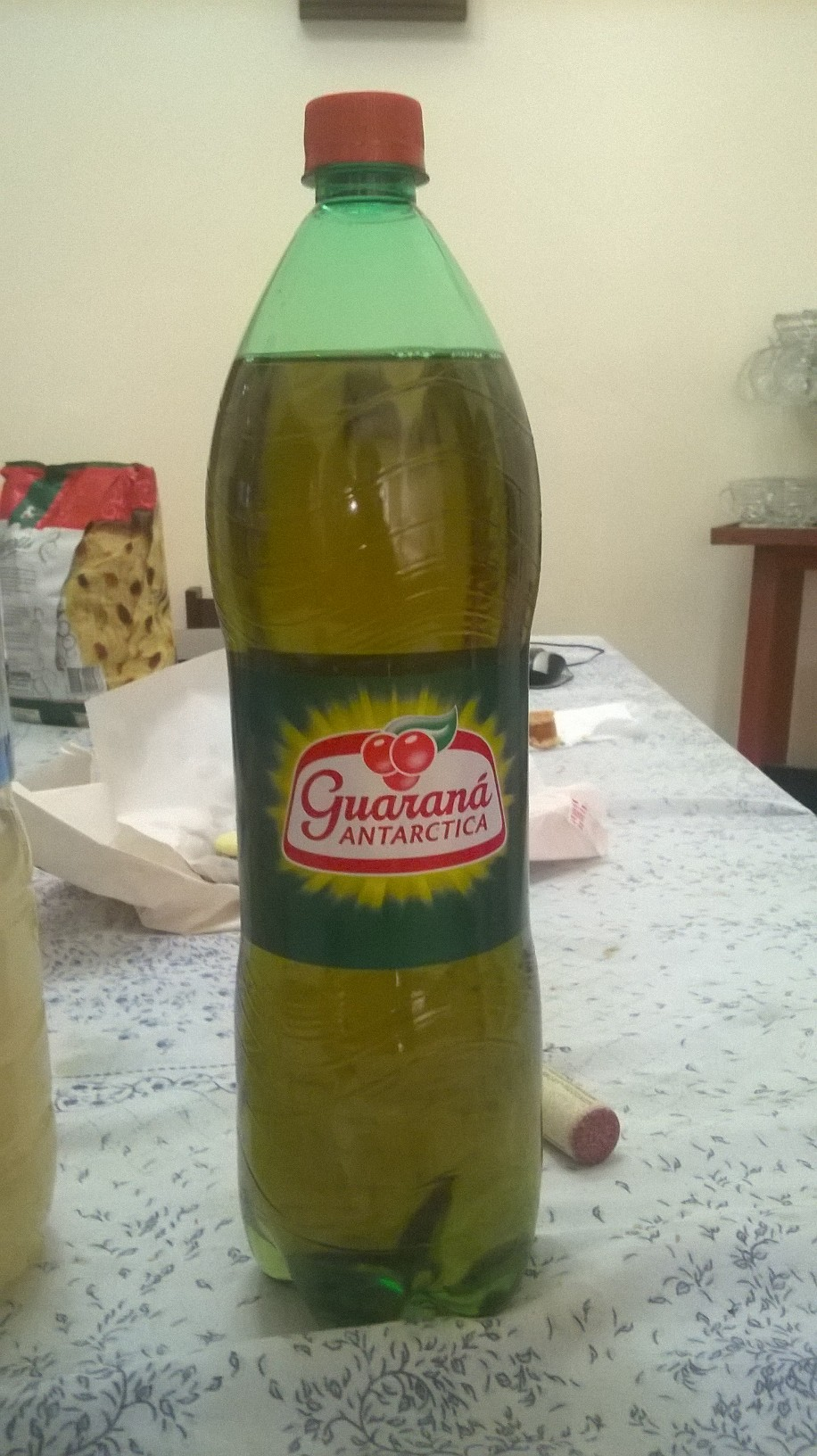
A plastic bottle of Guaraná Antarctica

The processing of the fruit syrup began in Brazil in 1905 by Fara, a physician from the city of Resende, Rio de Janeiro. A soft drink factory, Guaraná Cyrilla, was launched by F. Diefenthaller in 1906 in Santa Maria, Rio Grande do Sul. The drink initially was astringent and markedly bitter, and it did not become popular. The soft drink was created by Pedro Baptista de Andrade, who sold the formula to Antarctica, which then developed a process to eliminate the astringency and bitterness, emphasizing the characteristic flavor and aroma of the fruit, launching Guaraná Champagne Antarctica in 1921. Today, there are several brands of guarana soda available throughout Brazil.

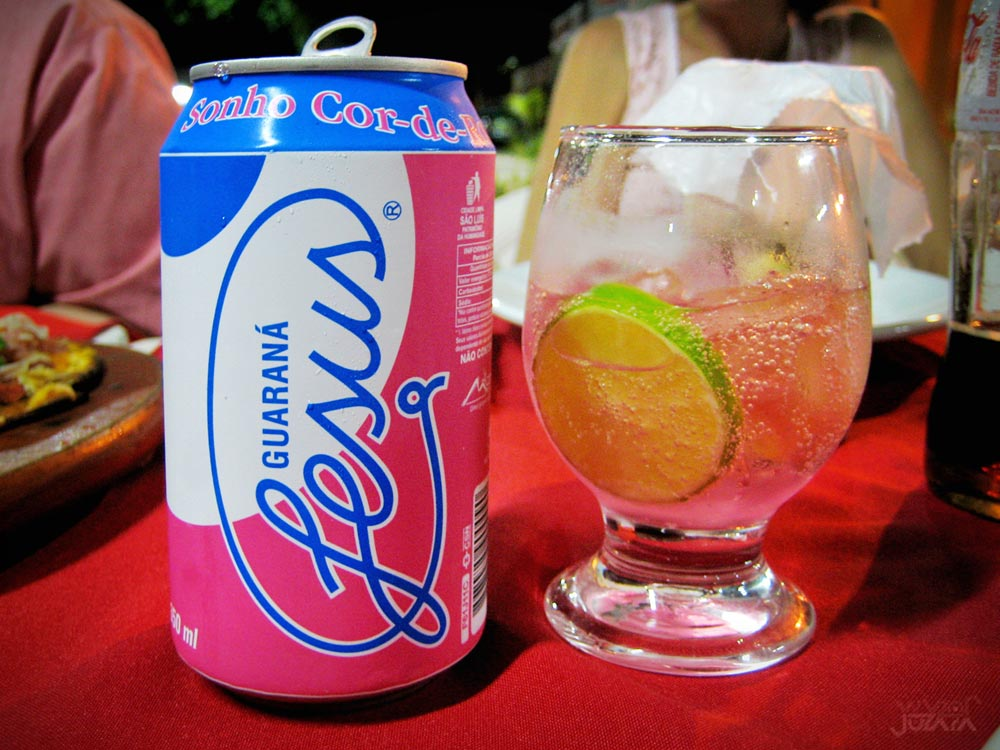
Guaraná Jesus with its non-traditional pink color

Guaraná Jesus, another guaraná soft drink, was created accidentally in 1920 by pharmacist Jesus Norberto Gomes, in the state of Maranhão. Gomes imported a gasification machine to produce a kind of magnesia fluid, a medicine famous at the time, with extracts of 17 ingredients from the Amazon rainforest, including guarana and cinnamon, but the business did not work. The pharmacist decided to make a drink for his grandchildren and pleased everyone. Over time, the taste of the pink drink has become less popular with people, but it remains quite popular in Maranhão, maintaining its original formula. In 2001, Coca-Cola bought this brand.

In Serbia and other Eastern European countries, energy drinks based on guarana are marketed under this name, but without the same sweet flavor as the soda; they have a bitter taste and cardio-accelerating effect.

== Brands ==
- Guaraná Antarctica (AB Inbev)
- Guaraná Backus
- Guaranita Cibal (Cibal)
- Guaraná Fruki (Fruki)
- Guaraná Mineiro
- Guaraná Okey Champ (Refrigerantes Okey)
- Cotuba (Arco Iris)
- Guaraná Jesus (The Coca-Cola Company)
- Kuat (The Coca-Cola Company)
- Fanta Guaraná (The Coca-Cola Company)
- Refriko Guaraná (Refriko)
- Guaraná Pureza (Bebidas Leonardo Sell)
- Guaraná Vencetex (Vencetex)
- Dolly
- Marajá (Refrigerantes Marajá[4])
- Dydyo (Dydyo)
- Leda (Lençóis Paulista/SP)
- Amazon Secret (sorze4 AS, Norway)
- Pulp Guaraná (Paraguay)
- Niko Guaraná (Paraguay)
- De la Costa Guaraná (Paraguay)
- Tamburi Guaraná (Paraguay)
- Piri Guaraná (Paraguay)
- Vita Guaraná (Paraguay)
- Isaac Guaraná (Paraguay)
- Japan
  - Co-up Guaraná (Japan)
  - Kirin Guaraná (Kirin, Hokkaido, Japan)
  - Secoma Guaraná (Seicomart Co., Hokkaido, Japan)
  - Lucky Guaraná (Lucky Pierrot Hamburger Co., Hakodate, Hokkaido, Japan)
