= Bibo =

Bibo or BIBO may refer to:

== People ==
- Bibo Bergeron, French animator and film director
- Erdal Bibo (born 1977), Turkish basketball player
- Irving Bibo (1889–1962), American composer, songwriter, and publisher
- István Bibó (1911–1979), Hungarian lawyer, civil servant, politician and political theorist
- Solomon Bibo (1853–1934), Jewish trader in the American Old West
- Gerhard Fischer (bobsleigh), German bobsledder
- Mahmoud El Khatib (nicknamed "Bibo"; born 1954), Egyptian retired footballer

== Other ==
- Bibliographic Ontology (BIBO), in information science
- Bibo (soft drink), produced by The Coca-Cola Company and sold in Africa
- Bibo and Beshir, an Egyptian film
- BIBO stability, a concept in signal processing
- Bibo, New Mexico, an unincorporated community in the United States
- Bibo language, a language of Papua New Guinea
- FC Bibo, an Ivorian football team
- Bulk In/Bags Out, a type of bulk carrier
- Bus In Bus Out, a form of Fly-in fly-out commuting work.
- "Bibo" (Star Wars Resistance)
