= Guaraná (Backus) =

Brand of beverage

- Type: Soft drink
- Manufacturer: Backus and Johnston Brewery
- Related products: Viva

Guaraná Backus is a Peruvian guaraná beverage containing guarana fruit and is sold in PET bottles of 500 ml. In 2007, the drink had 5% of the soft drinks market, and was relaunched with a new bottle and label and a light version. A year later, its sales had increased by 49%.

The brand has sponsored national windsurfing, taekwondo and youth football tournaments. It is widely used by Brazilian A/B youth sectors to be mixed up with whisky.
