= Club Cool =

Coca-Cola beverage store at Epcot

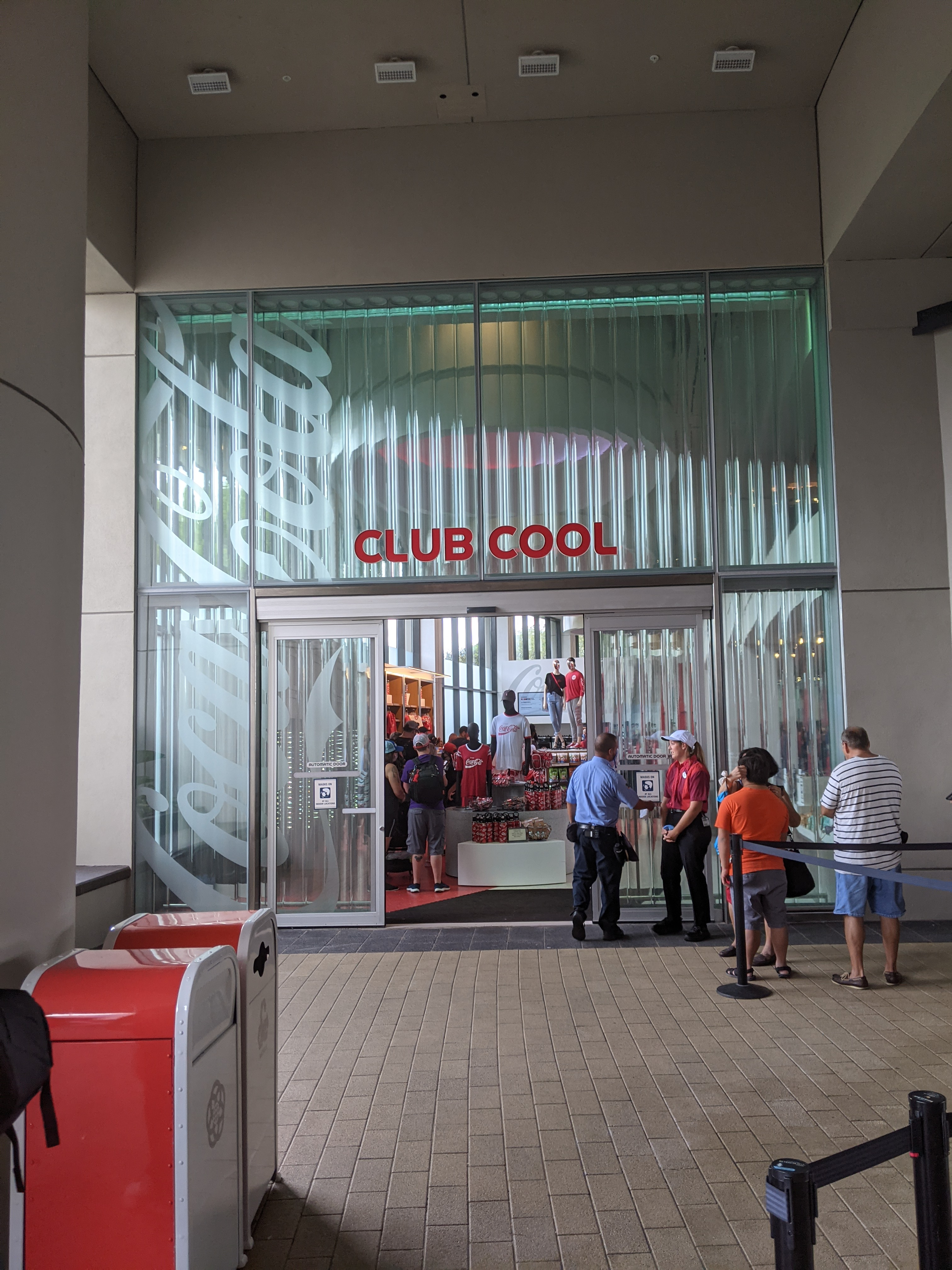
- Club Cool's current entrance

Epcot
- Area: Future World (original); World Celebration (relocation)
- Coordinates: 28.37388585326943°N 81.54857875883656°W
- Status: Operating
- Opening date: November 14, 2005 (original); September 15, 2021 (relocation)
- Closing date: September 8, 2019 (original)
- Replaced: Ice Station Cool (1998–2005)

Ride statistics
- Attraction type: Gift shop and beverage tasting area
- Designer: Walt Disney Imagineering
- Sponsor: Coca-Cola
- Wheelchair accessible

Club Cool (formerly Ice Station Cool) is an attraction and gift shop located in the former Innoventions East building within Epcot at the Walt Disney World Resort in Lake Buena Vista, Florida. It features complimentary samples of Coca-Cola soft drinks from around the world, similar to the World of Coca-Cola's tasting area in Atlanta, Georgia, although the latter offers a larger selection of products to taste (including both foreign and American beverages). Club Cool also offers Coca-Cola merchandise for purchase. The attraction reopened on September 15, 2021, along with the Creations Shop in the building that formerly housed Innoventions East and Mouse Gear, which became part of World Celebration.

== History ==
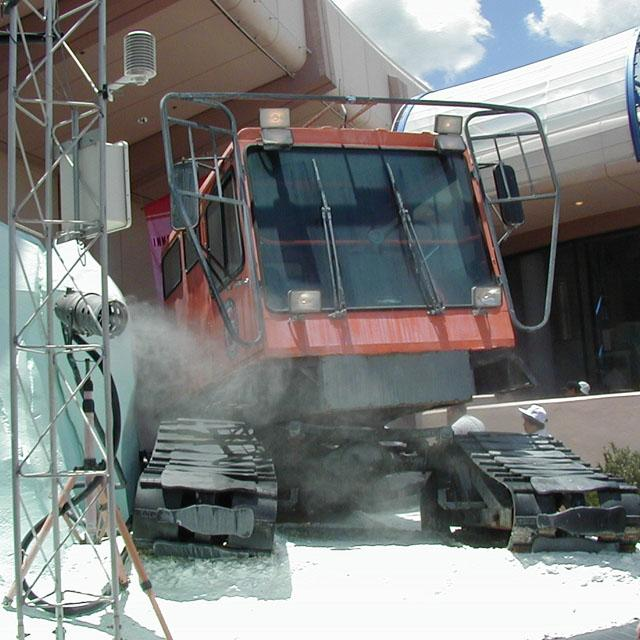
The entrance of predecessor Ice Station Cool

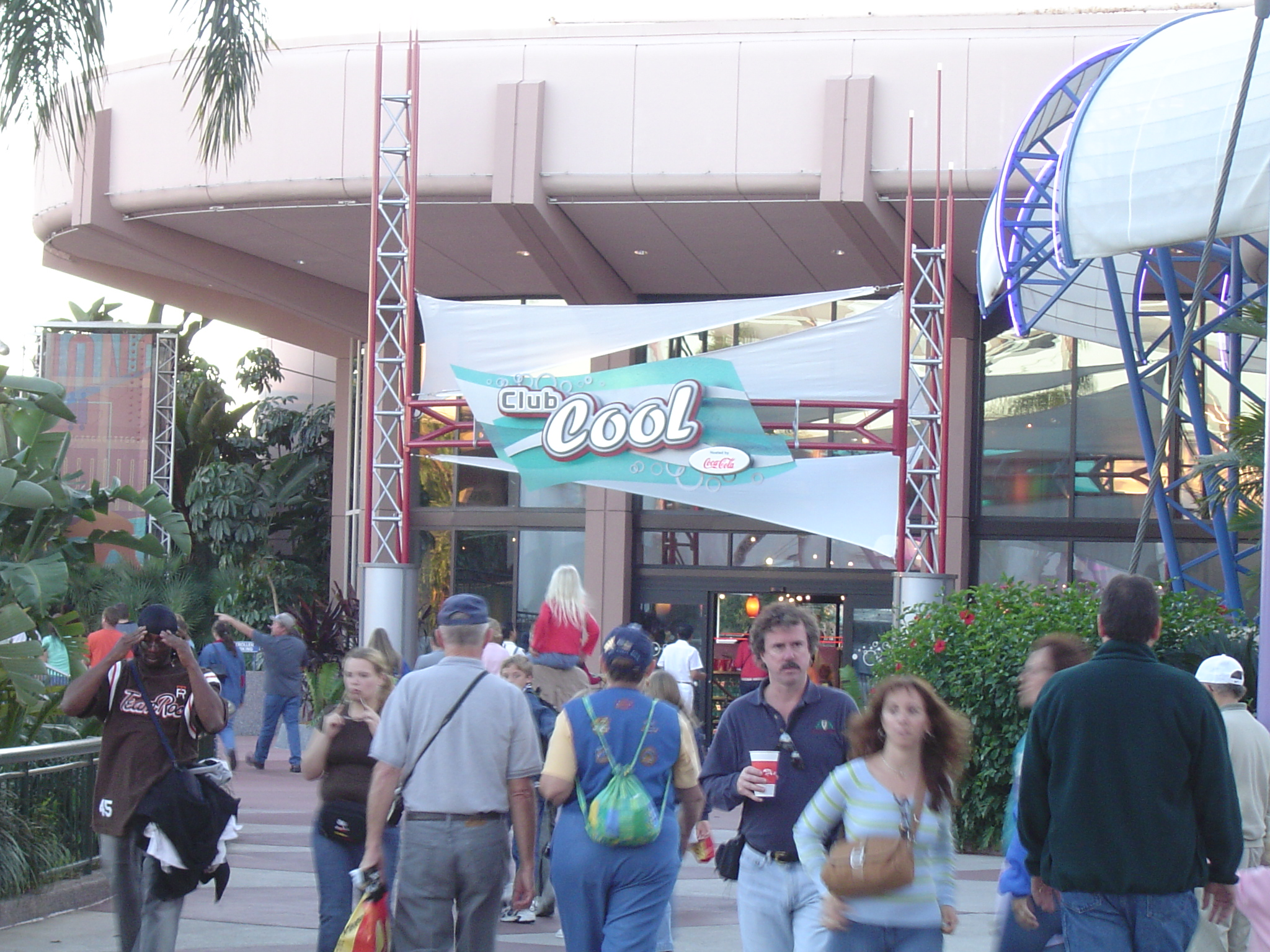
The original Club Cool's entrance in December 2005

Opened as Ice Station Cool in June 1998, the attraction was themed to a polar exploration, decorated with the pictured vehicle and cavemen frozen in ice. It closed on June 6, 2005, and re-opened as Club Cool on November 14, 2005. Club Cool gave guests samples of different Coca-Cola drinks from several countries for almost 14 years until it was closed on September 8, 2019, for Epcot's renovation. It reopened on September 15, 2021, in a new location next to the Creations Shop (formerly MouseGear) in the former Innoventions East building.

== Drinks offered ==
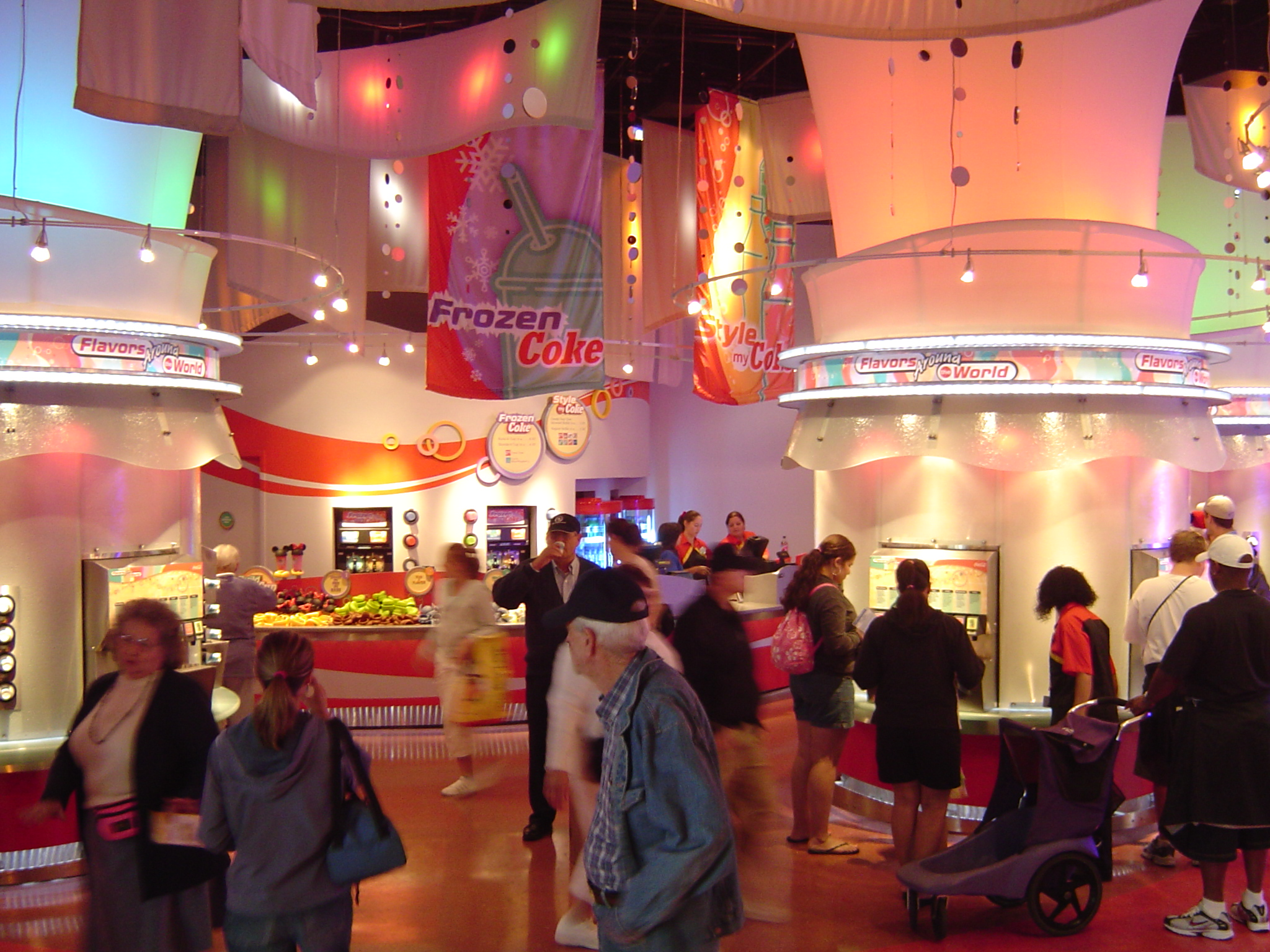
Club Cool, December 2005

The tasting area had self-serve soda dispensers, dispensing Coca-Cola products from several countries. The only drink that contained caffeine was Inca Kola.

After its relocation and reopening on September 15, 2021, Club Cool offers eight flavors:

- (Italy) Beverly - A very bitter non-alcoholic apéritif, Beverly is the only beverage to have been maintained in all rotations.
- (Madagascar) Bon Bon Anglais - A tropical fruit drink
- (Dominican Republic) Country Club Merengue - A smooth, creamy tropical fruit drink
- (South Korea) Minute Maid Joy Apple Lychee - A juice with apple and lychee
- (Philippines) Royal Wattamelon - Sour watermelon flavored soda
- (China) Smart Sour Plum - A tart, plum flavored soda
- (Russia) Sprite Cucumber - Cucumber-hinted variation of Sprite lemon soda
- (Moldova) Viva Raspberry - Raspberry flavored soda

=== Former flavors offered ===
==== Removed October 29, 2013 ====
- (China) Smart Watermelon
- (Israel) Kinley Lemon
- (Costa Rica) Fanta Kolita
- (Mexico) Lift Apple
- (Germany) Mezzo Mix
- (Mozambique) Krest Ginger Ale

==== Removed September 8, 2019 ====
- (Brazil) Guarana Kuat - Guarana berry flavored
- (Peru) Inca Kola - Lemon Verbena flavored, comparable to bubblegum
- (South Africa) Sparletta - Raspberry cream soda
- (Japan) VegitaBeta - A non-carbonated apricot and passion fruit flavored drink, VegitaBeta is the only beverage apart from Beverly to have been offered during the entire 2005–2019 original run of Club Cool.
- (South Africa) Bibo - Kiwi mango
- (Thailand) Fanta Melon Frosty - Melon
- (Greece) Fanta Pineapple - Pineapple; this beverage has since been made available for sale in the United States

== See also ==
- World of Coca-Cola
- List of Walt Disney World Resort attractions
