= Coco Loko =

Snortable chocolate-based powder

Coco Loko is a snortable chocolate-based powder marketed as "raw cacao snuff". It was introduced in July 2017, and is produced by the Orlando, Florida-based company Legal Lean Co., whose founder, Nick Anderson, is also the product's inventor. It attracted media attention after Senate Minority Leader Chuck Schumer called for snortable chocolate products sold in the United States to be investigated.

== History ==
Similar products had previously been successful in Europe for several years, but Coco Loko is the first snortable chocolate to be sold in the United States. Anderson has said he decided to sell the product after other similar products had been sold in Europe for several years, without any major health effects being reported in the media. He has acknowledged that he did not consult with any medical experts when making the product.

== Marketing ==
Legal Lean's website advertises Coco Loko by saying that it will give users "motivation that is great for partygoers to dance the night away without a crash".

== Ingredients ==
Although Legal Lean does not disclose the ingredients to Coco Loko other than cocoa powder, it has been reported that its other ingredients include those commonly found in energy drinks. Anderson has said that the other ingredients in the product include ginkgo biloba, taurine, and guarana.
