= Backus and Johnston Brewery =

Peruvian brewery

Unión de Cervecerías Peruanas Backus y Johnston S.A.A.
- Trade name: Backus
- Formerly: Cervecería Backus & Johnston S.A. (1955-1996)
- Type: Public Subsidiary
- Traded as: BVL: BACKUAC1; BVL: BACKUAC2; BVL: BACKUBC1; BVL: BACKUBC2; BVL: BACKUSI1; BVL: BACKUSI2
- Industry: Beverage
- Founded: 17 January 1879; 147 years ago
- Headquarters: Lima, Peru
- Products: Beer
- Parent: AB InBev
- Website: www.backus.pe

Backus and Johnston (Spanish pronunciation: [ˈbakus ˈi ˈjonson], Backus y Johnston) is the largest brewery in Peru, part of Bavaria Brewery, which itself is part of the international AB InBev group. Its main brewery is located in the Ate District of Lima. Backus, as owner of almost all brands of beer available in Peru, enjoys a de facto monopoly over Peruvian beer consumption. Besides beer, Backus produces soft drinks and bottled water.

== History ==
The Backus and Johnston brewery was founded in 1879 by the Americans Jacob Backus and John Howard Johnston in the Rímac District in Lima. In 1889, the two founders incorporated "The Backus and Johnston's Brewery Company Ltd" in London, and they transferred all their Peruvian brewery related assets to this new corporation in order to raise investment capital in the joint stock of London to continue their business growth. The founders continued as managing directors of the company until 1898 when Johnston left Peru; Backus died in 1899. The company operated as a British corporation until 1954, when the company management transferred the company assets and incorporation to Peru. At this time, The Backus and Johnston's Brewery Company Ltd was renamed as Cervecería Backus & Johnston S.A. In 1994, Backus and Johnston acquired a controlling interest in its rival on the Peruvian beer market, the National Beer Company (Compañía Nacional de Cerveza S.A.), formed in 1863; owner of the Pilsen Callao brand. In 1996, four breweries, including Backus and Johnston merged into one new company using the name Union of Peruvian breweries Backus and Johnston (Spanish: Unión de Cervecerías Peruanas Backus y Johnston S.A.A.).

In 2000, the company further expanded when the Brewery Company of Southern Peru (Cervesur) joined the union, making it owner of the popular Cusqueña brand. From 2005 to 2016, Backus and Johnston was part of the SABMiller group of breweries. The company still owns the prominently visible brewery in the Rímac district.

== Breweries ==
Backus owns breweries in various parts of Peru. Its main brewery is located in Lima, while the other breweries are still located in the parts of Peru they used to serve before the take-over by Backus and Johnston.

- Ate brewery in Lima (now Cristal, Cusqueña, Barena and Polar )
- Motupe brewery in Chiclayo (now Cristal and Pilsen Callao)
- Trujillo brewery in Trujillo (former Pilsen Trujillo, now Cristal, Pilsen Callao and Pilsen Trujillo)
- Arequipa brewery in Arequipa (former Arequipeña, now Arequipeña, Cristal, Cusqueña and Pilsen Callao)
- Cusco brewery in Cusco (former Cusqueña, now Cristal, Pilsen Trujillo, Cusqueña and Pilsen Callao)
- Pucallpa brewery in Pucallpa (former San Juan, now Cristal, Pilsen Callao and San Juan)

== Brands ==
=== Beers ===
Arequipeña

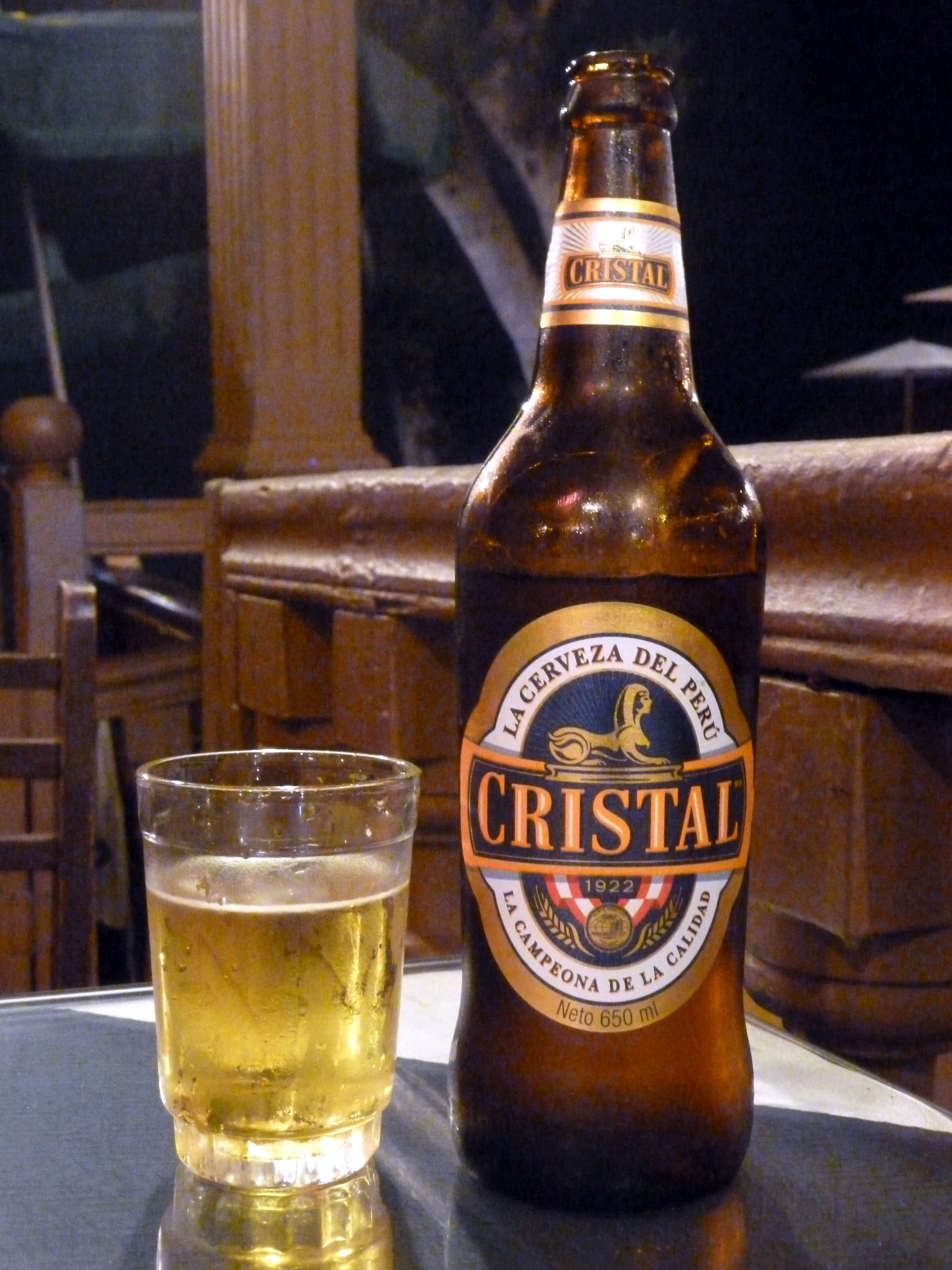
Cerveza Cristal

Backus and Johnston and Grupo Empresarial Bavaria own most of the popular beer brands in Peru, including: San Juan, a 5% abv pale lager. San Juan is brewed in the Backus brewery located in Pucallpa. Before the take-over by Backus, San Juan was brewed by Cervecería San Juan S.A.A. This brewery was founded on 2 September 1971 in Pucallpa in the Ucayali Region and named after San Juan Bautista.

Cusqueña is one of Peru's most ubiquitous brands. It has been traditionally produced in a "dorada" (golden) and a "negra" (black) styles. The latter is typical of a lighter porter, not quite as dark as most stouts. In recent years Cusqueña has also been sold in red lager, trigo (wheat), and quinoa variants.

Arequipeña was a rival product to Cusqueña and Cristal until the take-over by Grupo Empresarial Bavaria. Arequipeña is brewed in the Cervecera del sur del Peru brewery located in Sachaca near Arequipa, Peru. Barena; Cristal Cusqueña is a light lager, or a dark malted beer. Some label designs were created by Barry Laughlin.

- Callao is a 5% abv pilsener (pale lager); the brand was originally owned by the National Beer Company, which was acquired by Backus and Johnston in 1994.
- Trujillo (pilsener)
- Barena
- Malta Polar (Peru)

Backus and Johnston also has a license to import Birra Peroni Nastro Azzurro in Peru.

=== Soft drinks ===
The soft drinks owned by Backus include Viva, a beverage similar to Inca Kola and Guaraná, a beverage containing guaraná fruit.

- Guaraná
- Viva
- Saboré (this product line was terminated in 2008)

=== Bottled water ===
Bottled water is produced under the brand names Cristalina Backus and San Mateo.

- San Mateo is a Peruvian brand of bottled water owned by Backus and Johnston and sold in Peru. San Mateo is sold in PET bottles of 600 ml, 1.5, 2.5 and 7 litre.
- Cristalina Backus

== See also ==
- List of beverage companies of Peru
