= Senzao =

Carbonated drink of Brazil

- Manufacturer: The Coca-Cola Company
- Origin: Brazil (where Guaraná comes from); Mexico (where it's sold)
- Colour: Red-Orange
- Variants: Senzao Guaranaranja (Limited Edition)

Senzao is a carbonated drink made with the Amazonian fruit guaraná. It is available in Mexico. A limited time flavor called Senzao Guaranaranja, which is the base drink with added orange flavor, was released in 2004, before being discontinued not long after, somewhere in 2005-2007.
