= Smart (drink) =

Soft drink by The Coca-Cola Company

The Smart (Chinese: 醒目, romanized: Xǐngmù) soft drink is developed by The Coca-Cola Company for consumers in China since 1997. It is available in a variety of flavours.

Several flavours of Smart were formerly featured and available for tasting at Club Cool in Epcot at the Walt Disney World Resort in Florida.
