= Guaraná Antarctica =

Brazilian Guaraná-flavored soda

- Type: Guaraná (soft drink)
- Manufacturer: Ambev
- Origin: Brazil
- Introduced: 1921
- Color: Caramel
- Variants: Guaraná Antarctica Zero; Guaraná Antarctica Ice; Guaraná Antarctica Champagne; Guaraná Antarctica Seleção; Guaraná Antarctica Diet; Guaraná Antarctica Light; Guaraná Antarctica Açaí; Guarah
- Website: GuaranáAntarctica.com.br

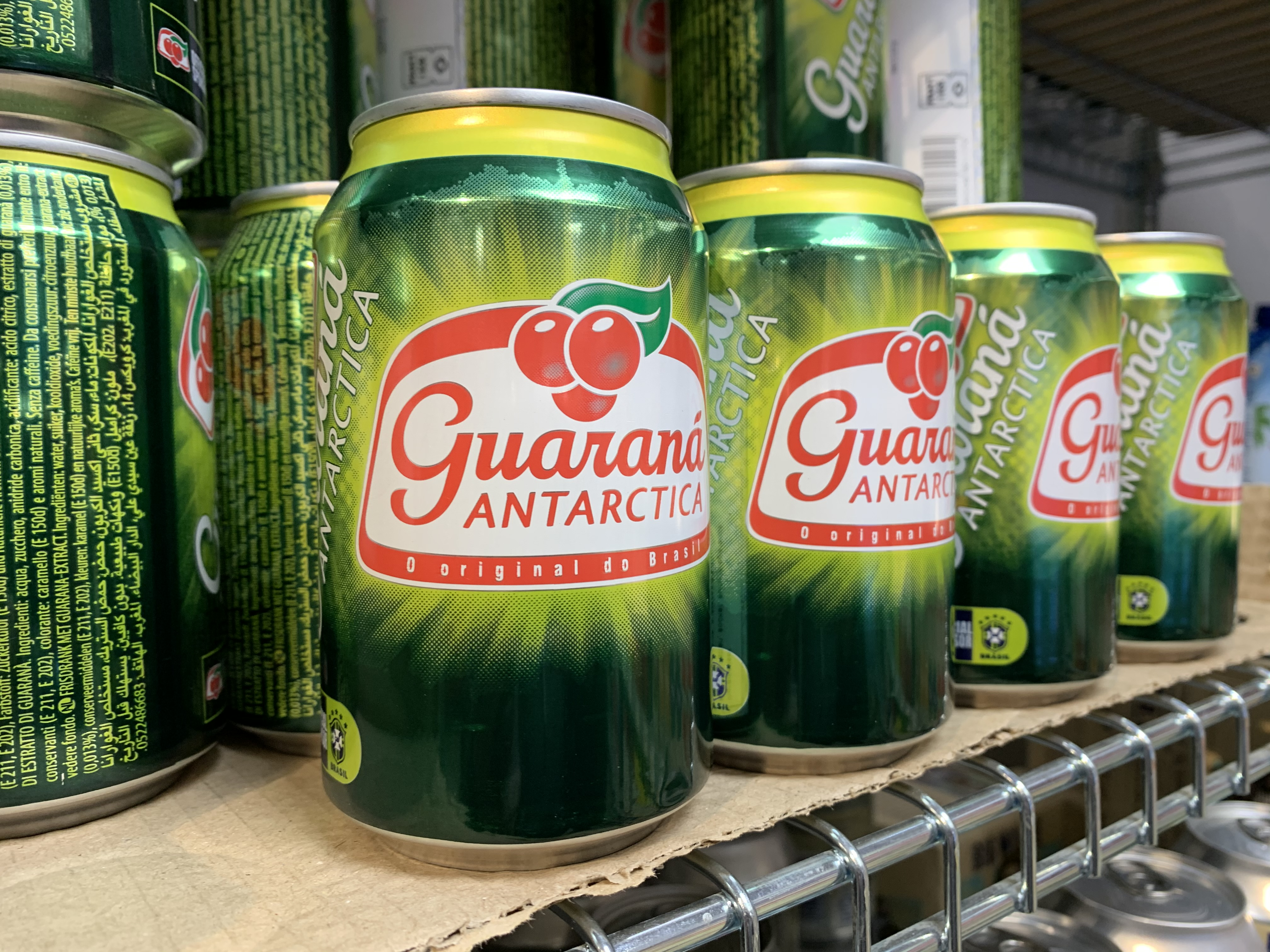
Cans of Guaraná Antarctica in Sweden

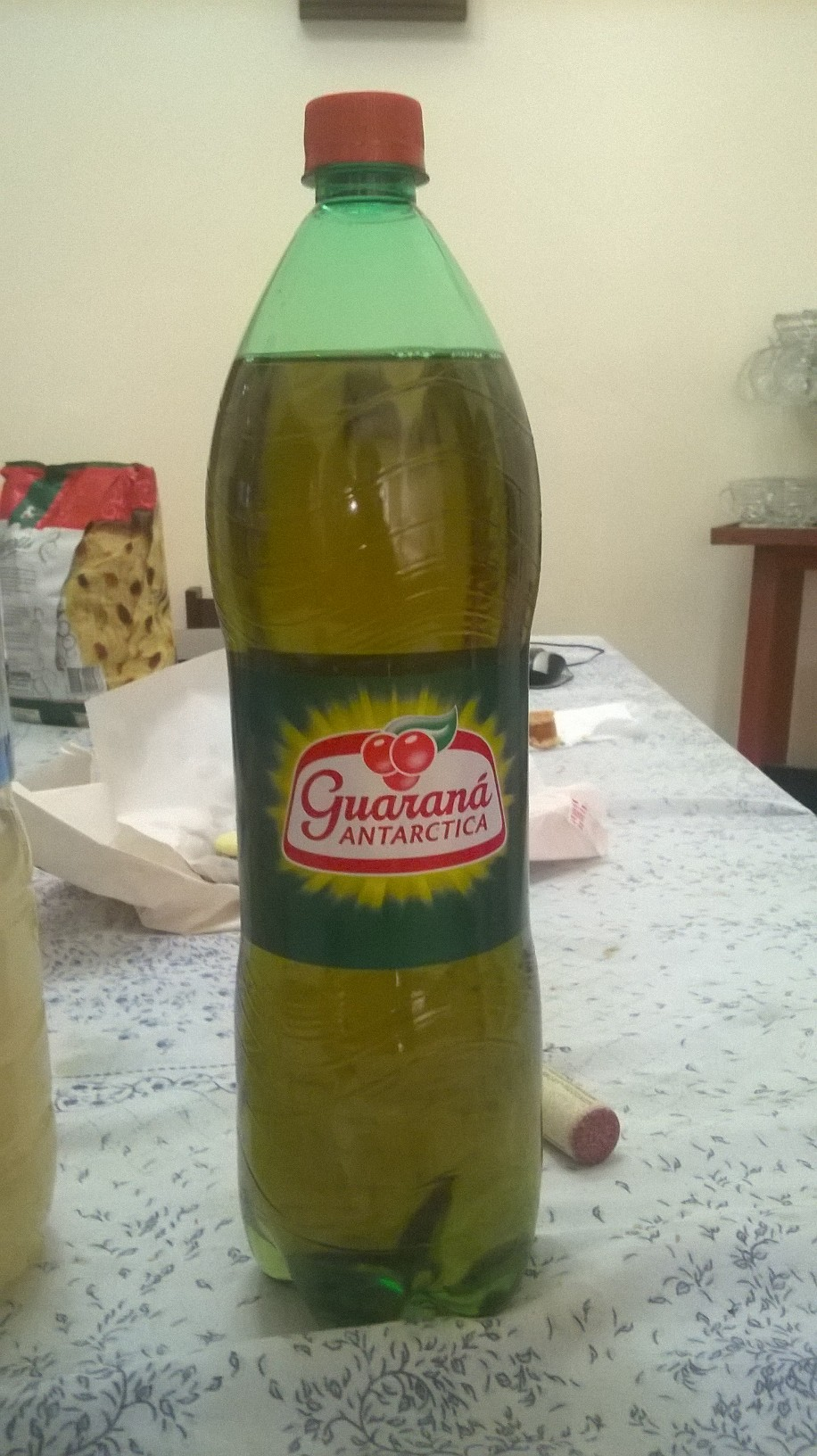
1.5-liter bottle of Guaraná Antarctica

Guaraná Antarctica is a brand of guaraná-flavoured soft drink, originating in Brazil. It was created in 1921 by Pedro Baptista de Andrade for Companhia Antarctica Paulista. The drink is produced in five countries: Portugal, Brazil, Argentina, Bolivia and Japan.

In Brazil, it is also available as the low calorie version Guaraná Antarctica Zero.

Guaraná Antarctica is also available in Portugal, Panama, Spain, Honduras, Haiti, Paraguay, Norway, Denmark, Finland, Bulgaria, France, Luxembourg, the Netherlands (cans only), Belgium, Israel, Italy, Switzerland, Sweden, Canada, Ireland, United Kingdom (in some Tesco and Waitrose stores), parts of Japan, United States (in bottles and cans), Argentina and infrequently in Germany, Australia (cans and two-litre bottles) and Austria (cans only).

The taste is mild and slightly apple-like, with a berry after-flavour.

== Ingredients ==
Carbonated water, sugar, (E150d) caramel colour, citric acid, (E211) sodium benzoate and (E202) potassium sorbate (preservatives), ascorbic acid (antioxidant), guaraná extract and natural flavours.

Guaraná Antarctica
Nutritional value per 100 mL
- Energy: 41.5 kcal (174 kJ)
- Carbohydrates: 10 g
- Sugars: 10 g
- Fat: 0 g
- Saturated: 0 g
- Monounsaturated: 0 g
- Polyunsaturated: 0 g
- Protein: 0 g
Vitamins and minerals
Minerals	Quantity %DV^{†}
Sodium	0% 5.5 mg
- Link to Antarctica's product page
- ^{†}Percentages estimated using US recommendations for adults.

== Advertising ==
One of Guaraná Antarctica's 2006 commercials featured Argentine football player Diego Maradona finding himself wearing the yellow jersey of the Brazilian team and singing the Brazilian national anthem before waking up and proclaiming it was a nightmare, because he had drunk too much guaraná the day before.

Guaraná Antarctica aired a controversial commercial showing the guarana berry plantations in the Amazon region while a narrator explained the basics of the process of producing Guaraná Antarctica and introduced the audience to the guaraná tree. By the end of the spot, the narrator turns to the audience and says: "Now ask Coca-Cola to show you the coca tree...". This spot was a direct attack to Coca-Cola and how its flagship product initially contained cocaine. In response, Coca-Cola aired equally controversial commercials for its guaraná-based Kuat drink, such as one in which former World No. 1 Tennis Player Gustavo Kuerten asks a street vendor for a guaraná, to which the vendor responds by throwing him a can of Guaraná Antarctica, which Kuerten throws back to the vendor. After a few exchanges, Kuerten proceeds to say: "joga direito!" ("throw it the right way"), which prompts the vendor to toss him a can of Kuat.
