= Iron Brew (South African drink) =

Carbonated soft drink

- Type: Soft drink
- Manufacturer: The Coca-Cola Company
- Introduced: 1975
- Colour: Caramel
- Flavour: Rosy Vanilla, Fruity
- Website: www.coca-colaafrica.com/brands/za/sparletta/iron-brew

Iron Brew is a caramel-coloured carbonated soft drink sold in South Africa. It has been sold by Coca-Cola since 1975, and is currently marketed as part of the Sparletta range. They describe the flavour as "rosy vanilla, fruity". A number of other manufacturers also offer Iron Brew soft drinks.

== See also ==
- List of soft drinks by country
