= Guaraná Jesus =

Brazilian soft drink

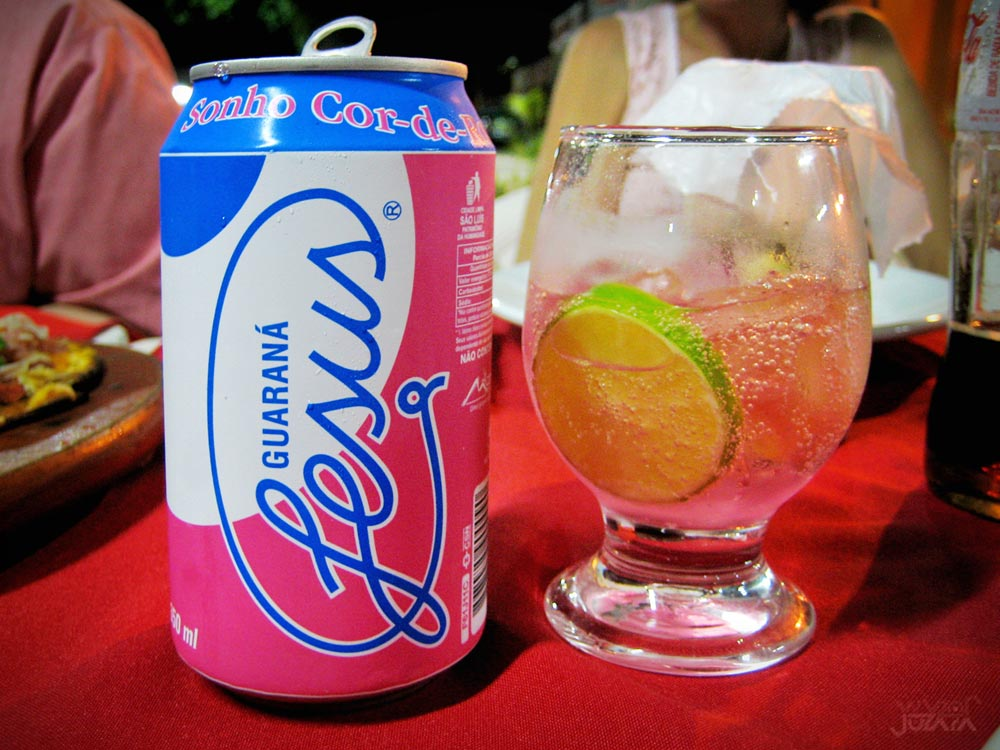
Guaraná Jesus on the rocks with lime

Guaraná Jesus is a Brazilian soft drink produced by Eduardo Lago, a Coca-Cola bottler based in São Luís. The drink is popular within the region, reportedly outselling Coca-Cola, and is made from extracts of the guarana plant, which contains caffeine (sometimes called "guaranine"), theophylline, and theobromine. Lago has noted that "Every Brazilian knows that guarana is a stimulant, and that means it stimulates everything". The drink is named for Jesus Norberto Gomes, the druggist who formulated the drink in 1920. The drink has a pink color, a cinnamon aroma and a very sweet taste, and is marketed with the slogan "the pink dream". The drink is now a brand owned by the Coca-Cola Company.

== See also ==
- Cajuína
- Itubaína
