= Trujillo (beer) =

Peruvian brand of beer

- Type: Beer
- Manufacturer: Backus and Johnston
- Country of origin: Trujillo city Peru
- Introduced: 1920
- Related products: Cusqueña, Cristal
- Website: www.pilsentrujillo.com.pe

Trujillo is a Peruvian brand of pilsner beer owned by Backus and Johnston. This beer is sold in Glass bottles of 310 ml, 355 ml, 500 ml, 620 ml and in cans. Pilsen Trujillo is brewed in the Backus brewery located in Trujillo city.

== History ==
Before the takeover by Backus in 1994, Trujillo was brewed by Sociedad Cervecera de Trujillo S.A., which also produced La Norteña. The first beer produced by the company was Libertad named after the La Libertad Region where Trujillo is located.

As a regional beer patterned after the Callao pilsner from Callao, it copied its stylized logo and its malta (dark beer) companion, although the latter was called Malta Trujillo. Over the years Compañía Nacional de Cerveza, makers of Pilsen Callao, bought the majority of SCT shares, a situation that remained until the takeover.

== See also ==
- Cusqueña
- Trujillo
