= VegitaBeta =

Japanese soft drink

VegitaBeta is a Japanese soft drink marketed by The Coca-Cola Company. Its name refers to a supplement of beta-carotene added to the drink. Its primary ingredients are sugar and water.

It was one of the eight international soda flavors featured and available for tasting at Club Cool in Epcot, prior to its closing.

It features apricot and passion fruit flavors, and at Club Cool it says "Originally launched in Japan in 1992, VegitaBeta is a non carbonated beverage with apricot and passionfruit flavors and is rich in Beta-Carotene that contributes to its unique yellowish-orange color."
