= Beverly (drink) =

Carbonated soft drink sold in Italy from 1969 to 2009

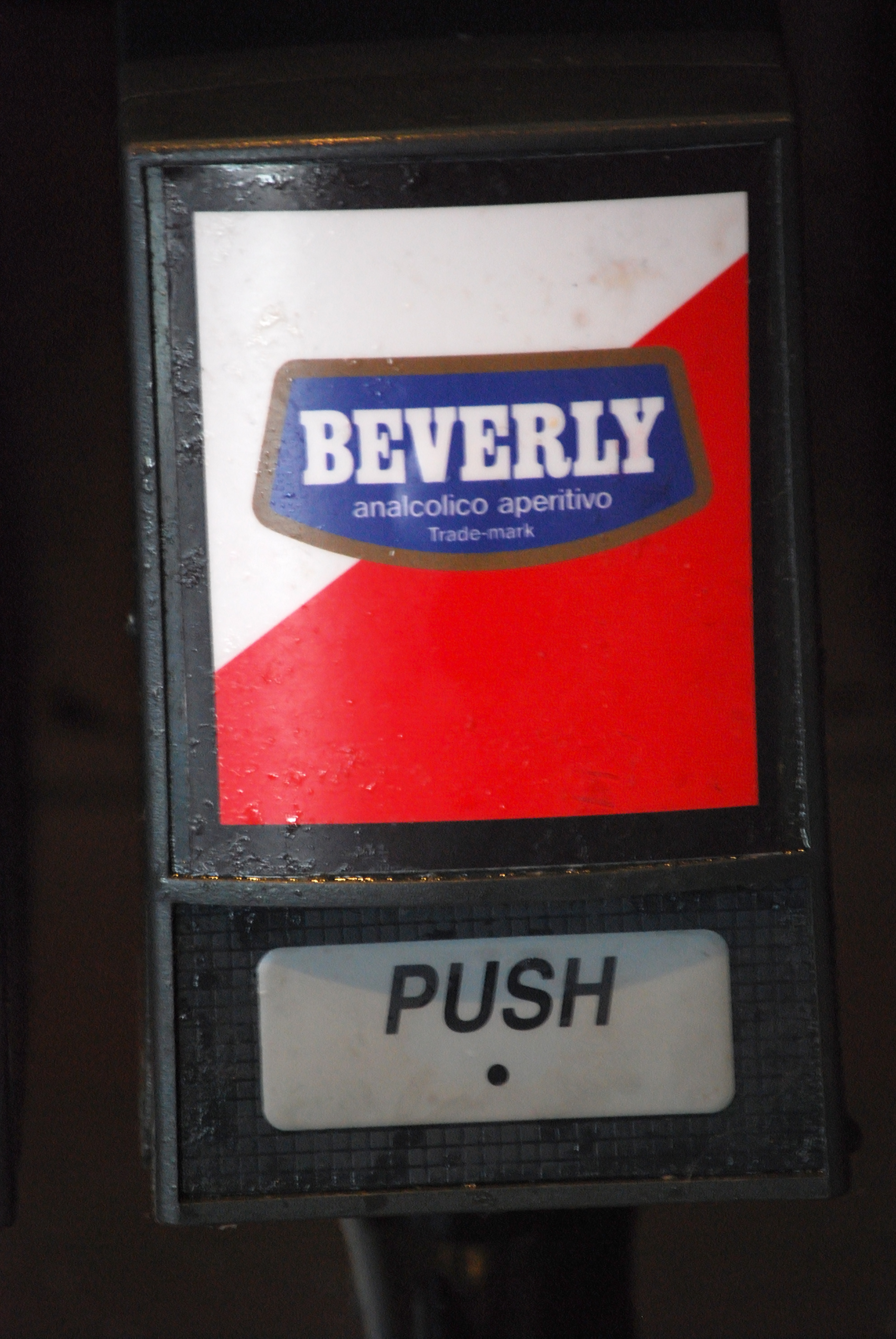
- Previous look for Beverly dispenser at Walt Disney World's Club Cool in Epcot
- Type: Carbonated soft drink apéritif
- Manufacturer: The Coca-Cola Company
- Origin: Italy
- Introduced: 1969; 57 years ago
- Discontinued: 2009; 17 years ago (still produced for World of Coca-Cola, Coca-Cola Store, and Epcot sampling)
- Colour: Clear
- Flavour: Bitter citrus
- Ingredients: Grapefruit rind

Beverly is a carbonated soft drink marketed as a non-alcoholic apéritif that was produced by The Coca-Cola Company for the Italian market, introduced in 1969. Following ongoing product consolidation in the Italian market, Beverly was discontinued in 2009.

The bitter taste of Beverly has become familiar to many Americans who get a chance to try it at Coca-Cola tasting stations at the World of Coca-Cola museums in Atlanta, Georgia and Las Vegas, Nevada, as well as the Coca-Cola Store at Disney Springs and Epcot's Club Cool, both located inside Walt Disney World in Lake Buena Vista and Bay Lake, Florida. Staff there have explained the flavoring ingredient as grapefruit rind, which includes intensely bitter components.
