= Coca-Cola Museum =

Museum in Taoyuan City, Taiwan

- 可口可樂博物館
- Established: 1998
- Location: Taoyuan District, Taoyuan City, Taiwan
- Coordinates: 24°58′49″N 121°19′36″E
- Type: Museum
- Website: www.coca-cola.com.tw

The Coca-Cola Museum (Chinese: 可口可樂博物館; pinyin: Kěkǒukělè Bówùguǎn) is a museum about the drink Coca-Cola, located on the Gueishan Industrial Park in Taoyuan District, Taoyuan City, Taiwan.

The facility was opened by Swire, which has an adjacent Coca-Cola bottling plant, in 1998. The museum building is colored red, like Coca-Cola.

== Transportation ==
The museum is 1.9 kilometres from Taoyuan railway station on the Taiwan Railway.

== See also ==
- List of food and beverage museums
- List of museums in Taiwan
