= Bibliographic Ontology =

RDF description of books and magazines

The Bibliographic Ontology (BIBO) is an ontology for the Semantic Web to describe bibliographic things like books or magazines. It is written in RDF and can be used as a citation ontology, as a document classification ontology, or simply as a way to describe any kind of document in RDF. It has been inspired by many existing document description metadata formats, and can be used as a common ground for converting other bibliographic data sources.

The Chronicling America website at the Library of Congress uses BIBO to model newspaper pages and issues in the Linked Data views.
