= Qoo =

Japanese beverage from the Coca-Cola company

Qoo logo

Qoo (クー, Kū) is a non-carbonated beverage from the Coca-Cola Company under its Minute Maid subsidiary. Originally introduced in Japan on May 28, 1999, in the Kyushu region and on November 1, 1999, in all of Japan after Coca-Cola executed the creation of a kid- and teen-oriented beverage after a year-long initiative. When Qoo was introduced, it replaced Hi-C in Japan. Qoo is now available throughout much of Asia in a variety of flavors including apple, grape and orange. As soon as Qoo was introduced, the white grape flavor was available at drink fountains in Japan, including at McDonald's. In Germany, the product line was sold from January 2003 until November 2005.

The name comes from the mascot's reaction to tasting the drink. The mascot was designed by Momoko Maruyama, who created Deko Boko Friends. The jingle, for the original Japanese commercial, is sung by Londell "Taz" Hicks, an American now living in Japan who is best known for the AKB48 overture.

Qoo is transliterated in Chinese as 酷兒 (kùér). It evokes images of "cool kid" since 酷 (kù) is a transliteration of the English word cool and 兒 (ér) means 'child' or 'son'.
