= Kuat (drink) =

Guarana-flavored soda sold by Coca-Cola in Brazil

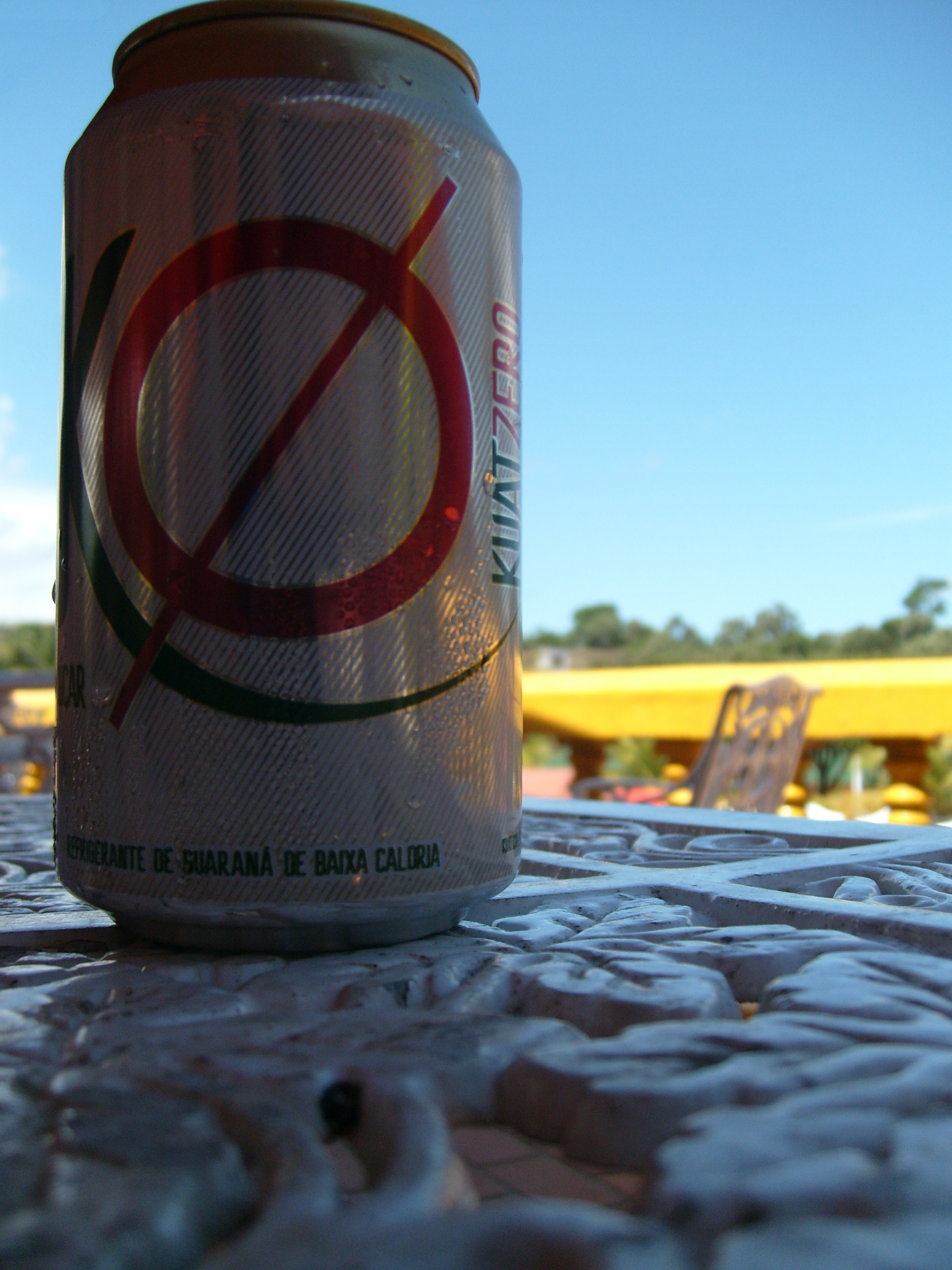
Kuat Zero Can

Kuat (Brazilian Portuguese pronunciation: [kwatʃ]) is a brand of guaraná beverage sold by The Coca-Cola Company in Brazil. Kuat was introduced in Brazil in 1997 to compete with the leading guarana beverage, Guaraná Antarctica, which was stealing market share from Coca-Cola's cola products.

In Brazil, Kuat is available in a diet version (Kuat Zero) and a green-tea infused version (Kuat Eko).

Kuat was briefly sold in Norway starting in 2003 under the name SanSão.

In 2002, Coca-Cola announced plans to test market Kuat in the United States.

== See also ==
- Guaraná Antarctica
- Sanduíche-iche – a meme used in a Kuat advertising campaign
