= Sparletta =

Soft drink from South Africa

300 ml can of Sparletta Creme Soda

Sparletta is a range of soft drink products manufactured by The Coca-Cola Company in South Africa and Zimbabwe. It was invented by Thomas Cook at his Standerton Coca-Cola factory in 1953. He also owned the Nigel Coca-Cola factory and the Witbank Coca-Cola factory.

Sparletta is distributed in Mayotte, Comoros, Zimbabwe, South Africa, Malawi, Lesotho, Namibia, Mozambique, Kenya, Uganda, Zambia, Botswana and Tanzania.

It is available in the following flavours: Creme Soda, Sparberry, Cherry Plum, Stoney Ginger Beer, Pine Nut, Iron Brew, Apple and Blackcurrant.

It was one of eight international soda flavours featured and available for tasting at Club Cool in Epcot prior to its closing in 2019.

== International availability ==
Sparletta is available at select Coles Supermarkets in Australia, Sainsbury's in the United Kingdom, Woolworths in New Zealand and many online shops around the world.

It also made an appearance in Coca-Cola's Club Cool at Walt Disney World before it closed.

Sparletta Sparberry is available at the Coca-Cola Store in Las Vegas, Nevada as a part of the ‘Around the World’ soft drink tasting.
