= World of Coca-Cola =

History museum of the Coca-Cola Company

Coordinates: 33.76280°N 84.39280°W

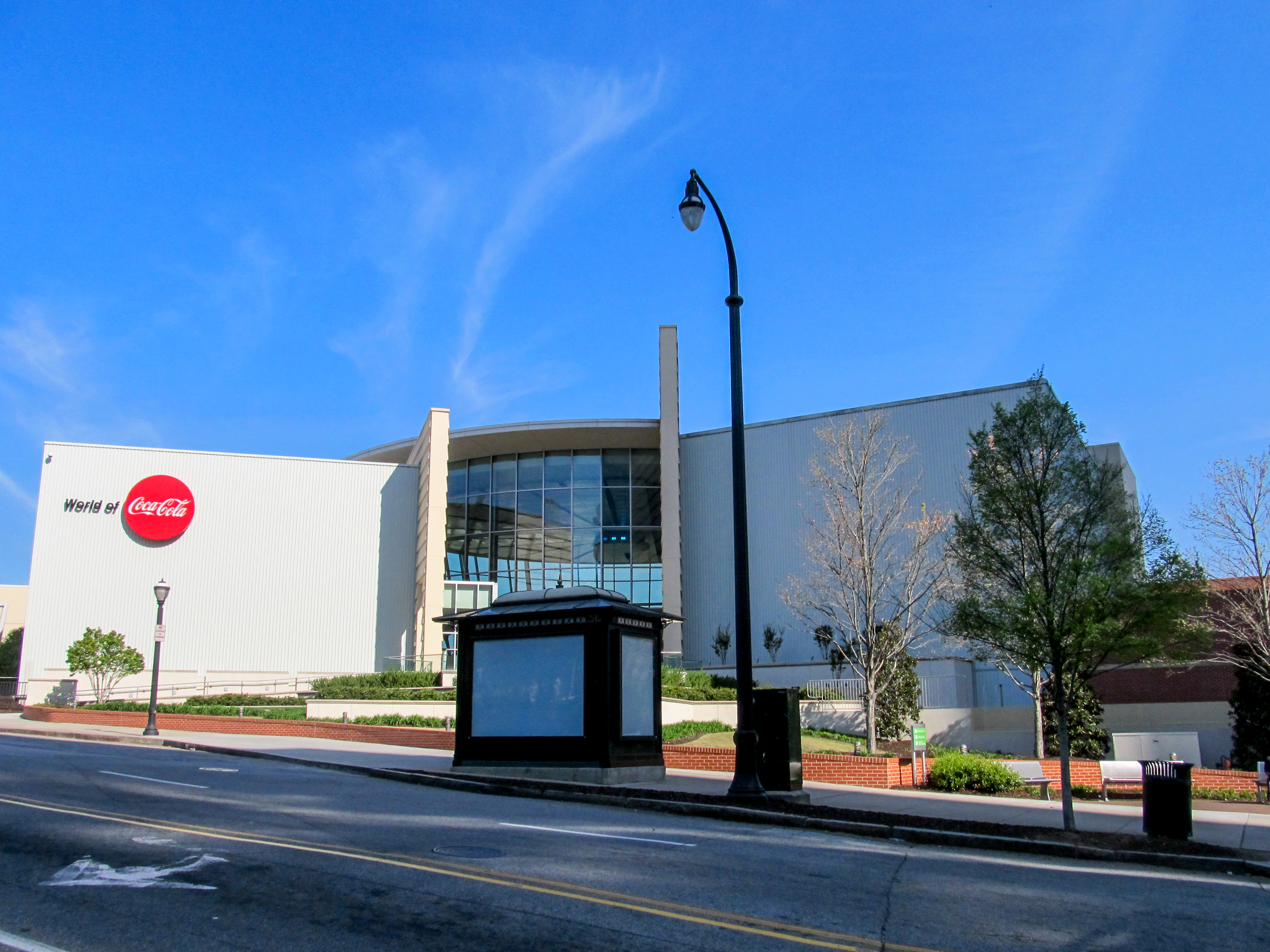
- The exterior of the World of Coca-Cola at Pemberton Place in 2015.

General information
- Type: Visitor center, indoor attraction center
- Location: Atlanta, Georgia, U.S., 121 Baker St NW, Atlanta, GA 30313
- Opening: August 3, 1990; 36 years ago
- Renovated: May 24, 2007; 19 years ago
- Owner: The Coca-Cola Company

Technical details
- Floor count: 2

Website
- worldofcoca-cola.com

The World of Coca-Cola is a museum located in Atlanta, Georgia, United States, showcasing the history of the Coca-Cola Company. The 20-acre (81,000 m^{2}) complex opened to the public on May 24, 2007, relocating from and replacing the original exhibit, which was founded in 1990 in Underground Atlanta. There are various similar World of Coca-Cola stores in locations such as Las Vegas and Disney Springs.

== History ==
=== Original museum: 1990–2007 ===
The original World of Coca-Cola was located in downtown Atlanta, Georgia, at 55 Martin Luther King Jr Drive, between the Georgia State Capitol and the Underground Atlanta shopping and entertainment district. The museum opened in 1990, and would remain open until 2007. The original World of Coca-Cola saw around nine million visitors during its years of operation, becoming Atlanta's most visited indoor attraction until it was surpassed by the Georgia Aquarium in 2009.

The museum was inspired to serve as a continuation of Coca-Cola history dating back to 1886. During this time, Dr. John S. Pemberton, a pharmacist from Atlanta, created a unique soft drink with a specific flavor syrup that was highly popular. Frank M. Robinson, his partner and bookkeeper, is responsible for the name of Coca-Cola as well as the well-known design of the script.

The museum was located in a three-story pavilion, and its entrance had a huge neon Coca-Cola sign (30 feet high and 26 feet wide). This sign was built by Metals Manufacturing in West Valley, Utah. The tour started on the top floor and worked downwards, featuring approximately 1,000 Coca-Cola artifacts presented in chronological order, interactive exhibits such as a replica 1930s soda fountain, video presentations of Coca-Cola advertising over the years, and a 10-minute film about Coke around the world. The tour featured the 'Spectacular Fountain,' where visitors were allowed to sample various Coke products. At the 'Tastes of the States' area in the same room, guests were able to try 22 different soft drink brands, some available only regionally.

The 'Tastes of the World' exhibit was located in the International Lounge. There was also a gift shop.

The Georgia state government acquired the former World of Coca-Cola building for $1.1 million after Coca-Cola vacated the facility in 2007; the state would later acquire the surrounding land in 2016 as part of a property exchange with the Atlanta city government. State legislators had made proposals to install a state history museum in the building, but no action had been taken due to the cost of refurbishing the old World of Coca-Cola building as well as the lack of funding to do so. In June 2024, the former World of Coca-Cola building was demolished for parking for the State Capitol complex to accommodate construction of a new legislative office building as well as renovations to the State Capitol building, which are projected to be completed in time for the 2027 legislative session.

=== Relocation and new facilities: 2007–present ===
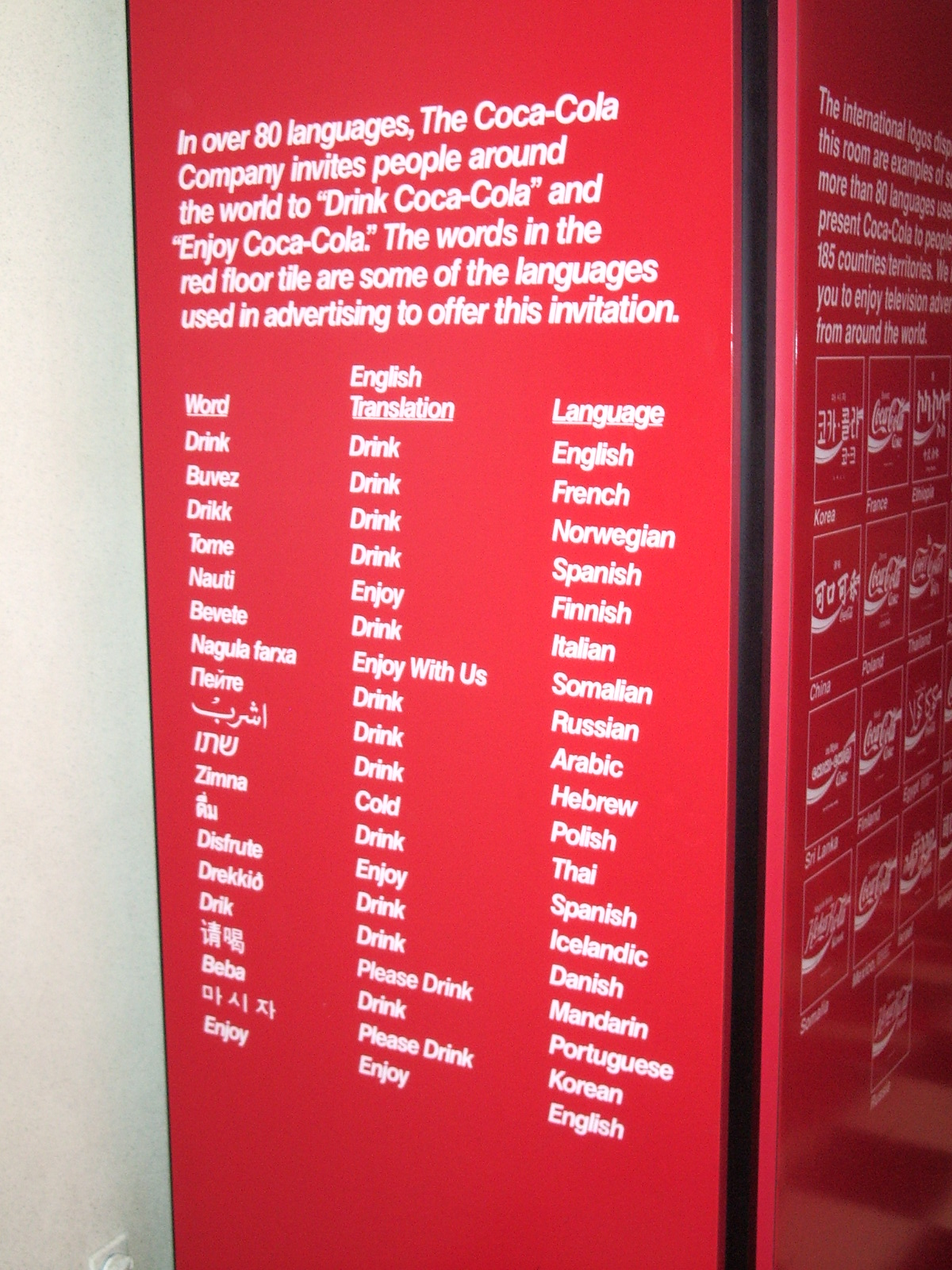
Coca-Cola around the world

The Atlanta museum was relocated to 121 Baker Street in Atlanta, just blocks away from where John Pemberton created the original Coca-Cola formula. The 92,000-square-foot building was constructed at a cost of $97 million and opened in 2007. It is located in Atlanta, Georgia (where the company's headquarters are located) at Pemberton Place (named in honor of John Pemberton, the inventor of Coca-Cola). The 20-acre (81,000 m^{2}) complex is located across Baker Street from Centennial Olympic Park and is also home to the Georgia Aquarium and the Center for Civil & Human Rights. It opened to the public on May 24, 2007, relocating from and replacing the original exhibit.

The museum features exhibits about the secret formula of Coca-Cola, a 3D movie where an intrepid scientist and his assistant set out to find the secret for themselves (featuring actors James Meehan and Jameelah Silva), and allows visitors to taste 60 different flavors from around the world, including some that are no longer sold. It also houses a fully functional bottling line that produced 8-ounce bottles of Coca-Cola for distribution to its guests. However, citing operation costs, since 2013, the plant runs in simulation as such practice was discontinued.

==== Non-Atlanta locations ====
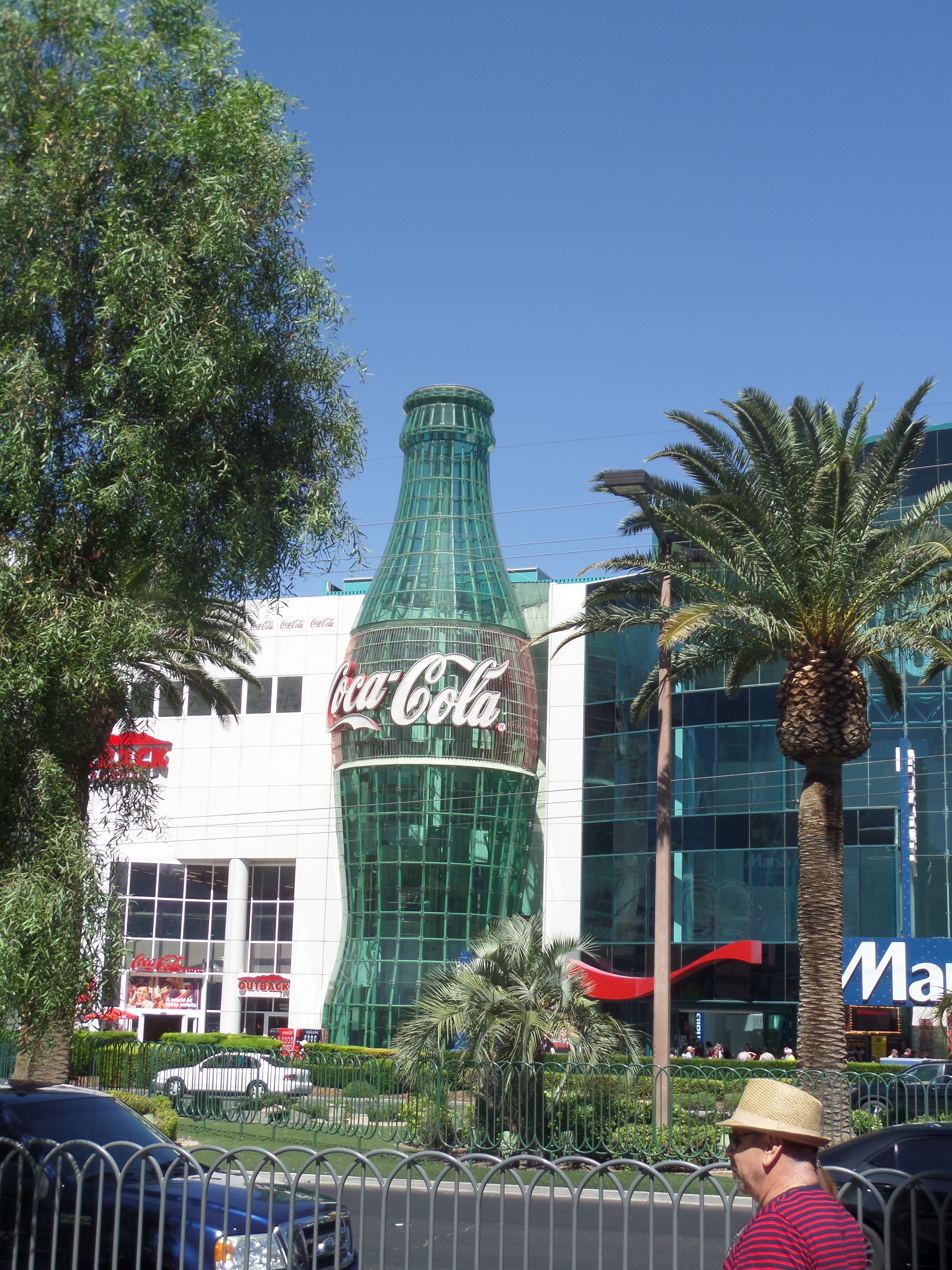
Everything Coca-Cola Store in Las Vegas Nevada as seen in June 2017

In July 1997, a second World of Coca-Cola attraction opened in Las Vegas at the Showcase Mall on the Las Vegas Strip. The attraction, aside from the Everything Coca-Cola store, was closed in March 2000 amidst restructuring at The Coca-Cola Company. As of 2026, the Las Vegas Coca-Cola Store remains in operation.

In May 2000, a third World of Coca-Cola location opened on the 6th floor of Mediage in Odaiba, Tokyo, Japan. It closed in January 2007.

There is also a Coca-Cola Museum in Taoyuan City, Taiwan as of 2007.

A Coca-Cola gift shop and attraction known as Club Cool, formerly Ice Station Cool, has been located in Walt Disney World's Epcot park since 1999. Under its original facade, it was themed to resemble a polar expedition with props such as a snowmobile. Like other Coca-Cola exhibits, it includes an area where guests can taste Coca-Cola beverages from around the world. In 2016, a new Coca-Cola store opened at Disney Springs, which was modelled like the Atlanta attraction. It features a sampling of Coca-Cola products from around the world as well as a rooftop bar.

== Gallery ==
Old Atlanta location

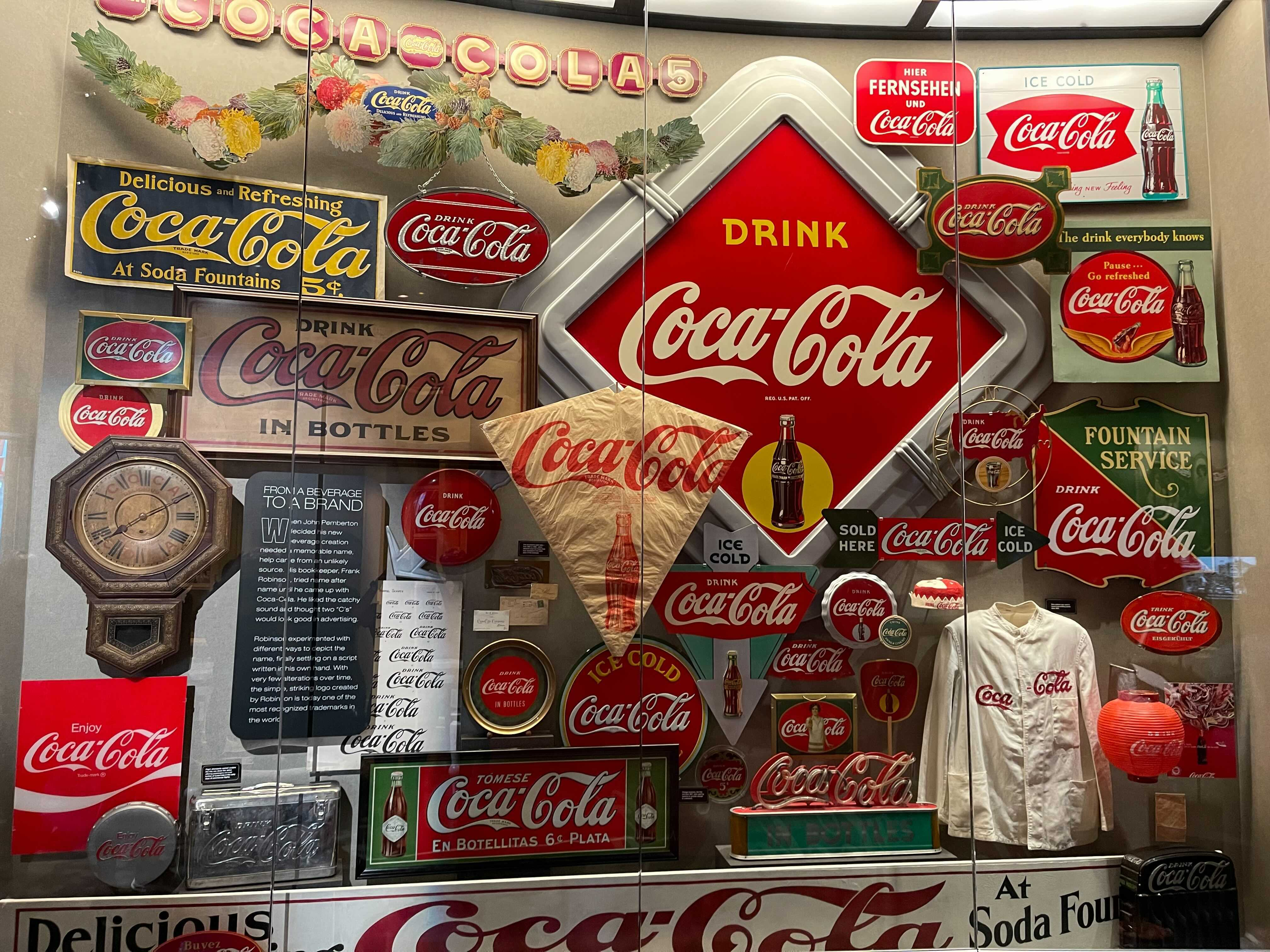
Coca-Cola artifacts from the 19th, 20th & 21st century

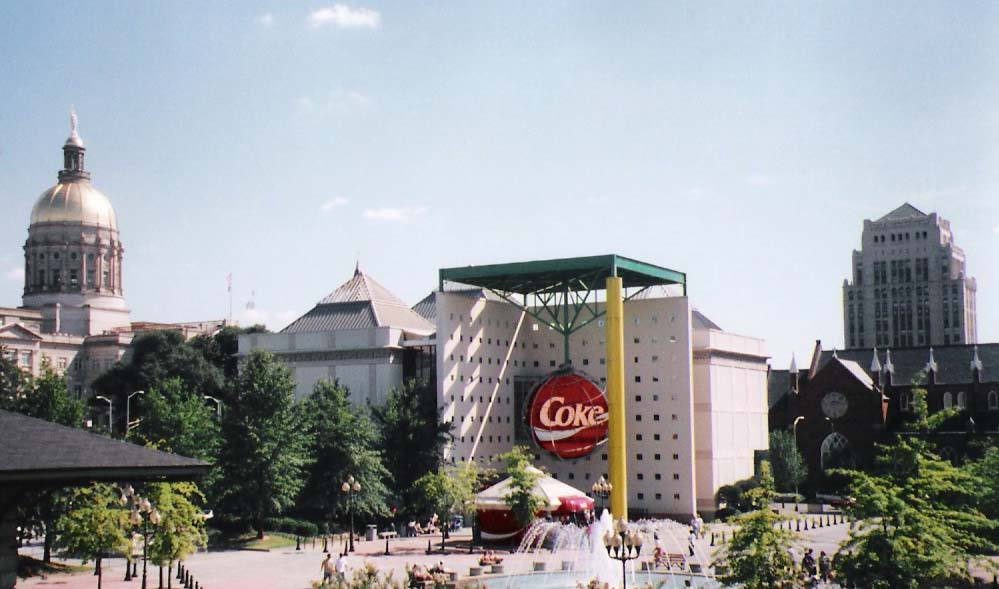
Exterior in 2006, between Underground Atlanta and Georgia State Capitol

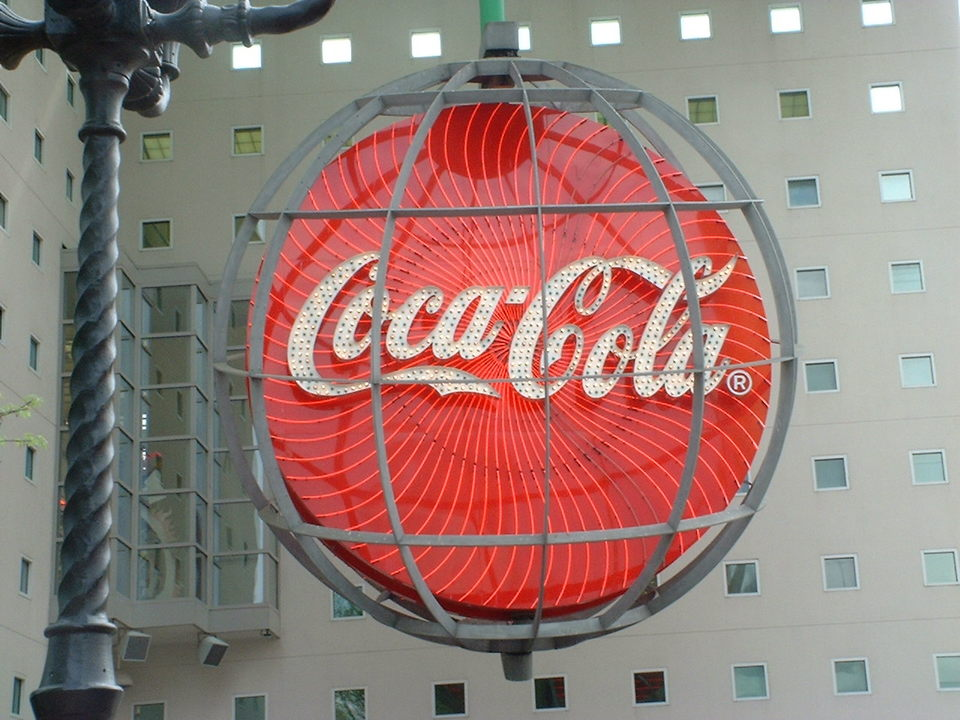
Sign from the Atlanta museum in 2005, two years before it relocated

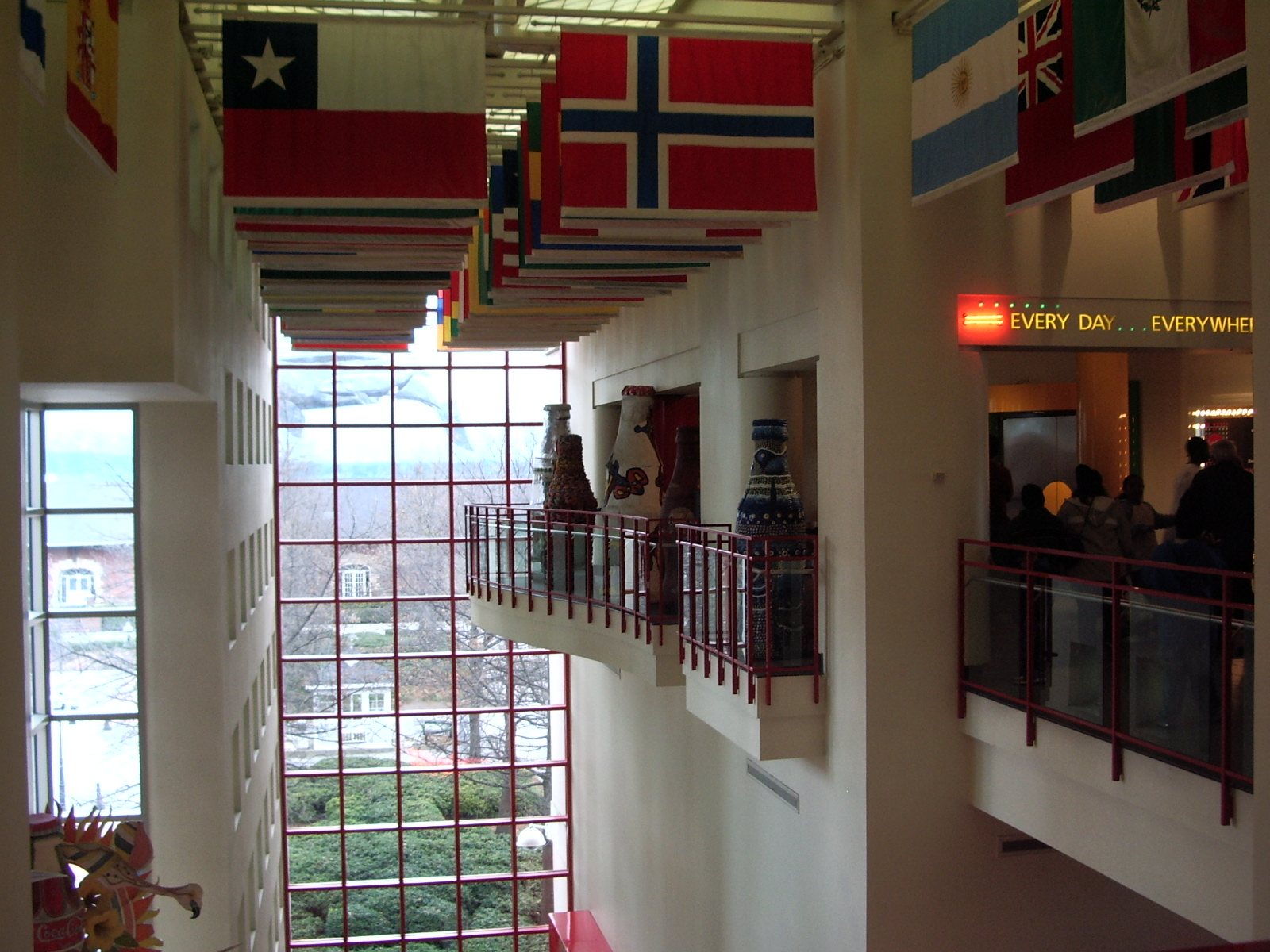
Interior in 2005

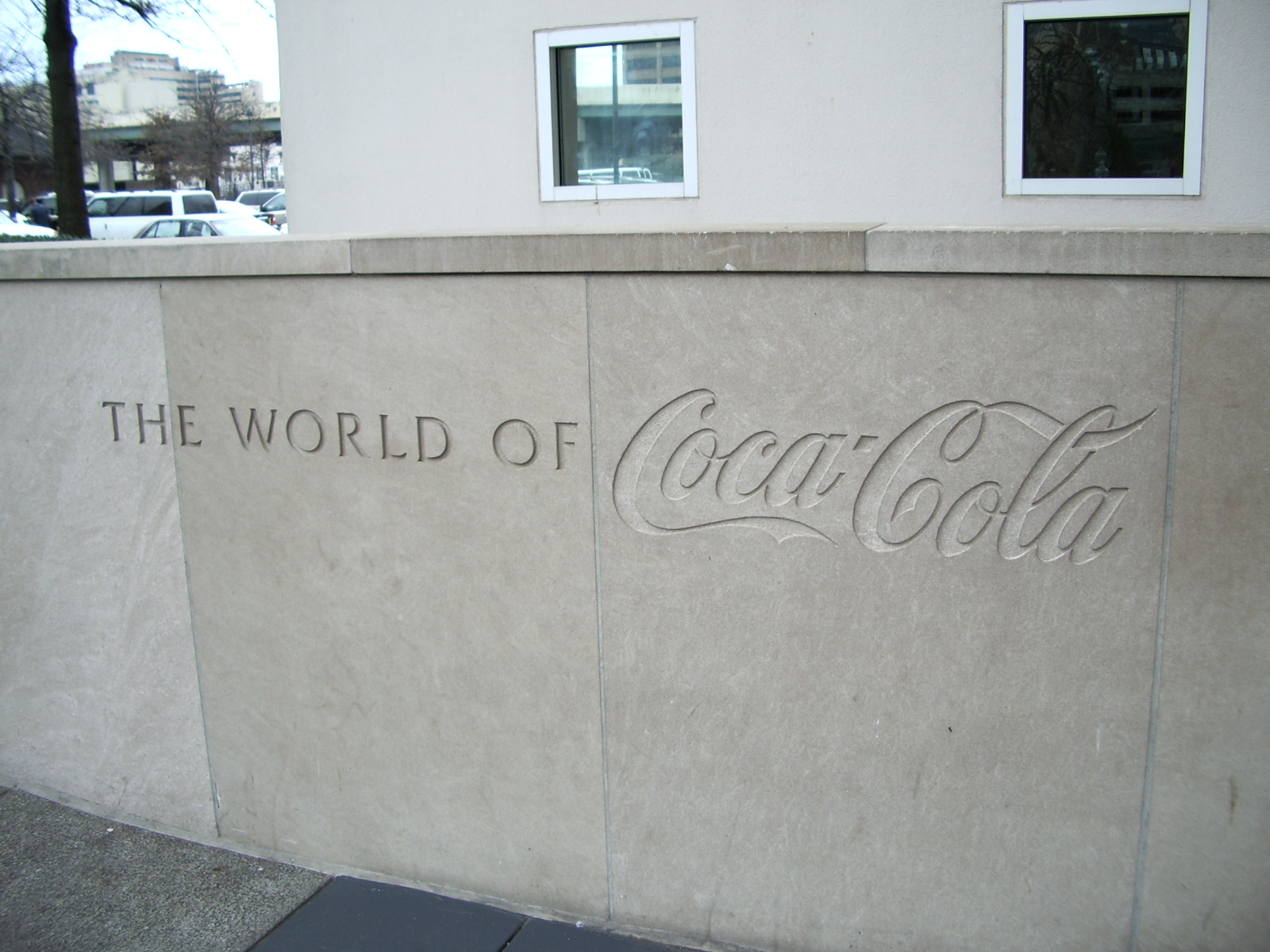
Sign in 2005
Current Atlanta location

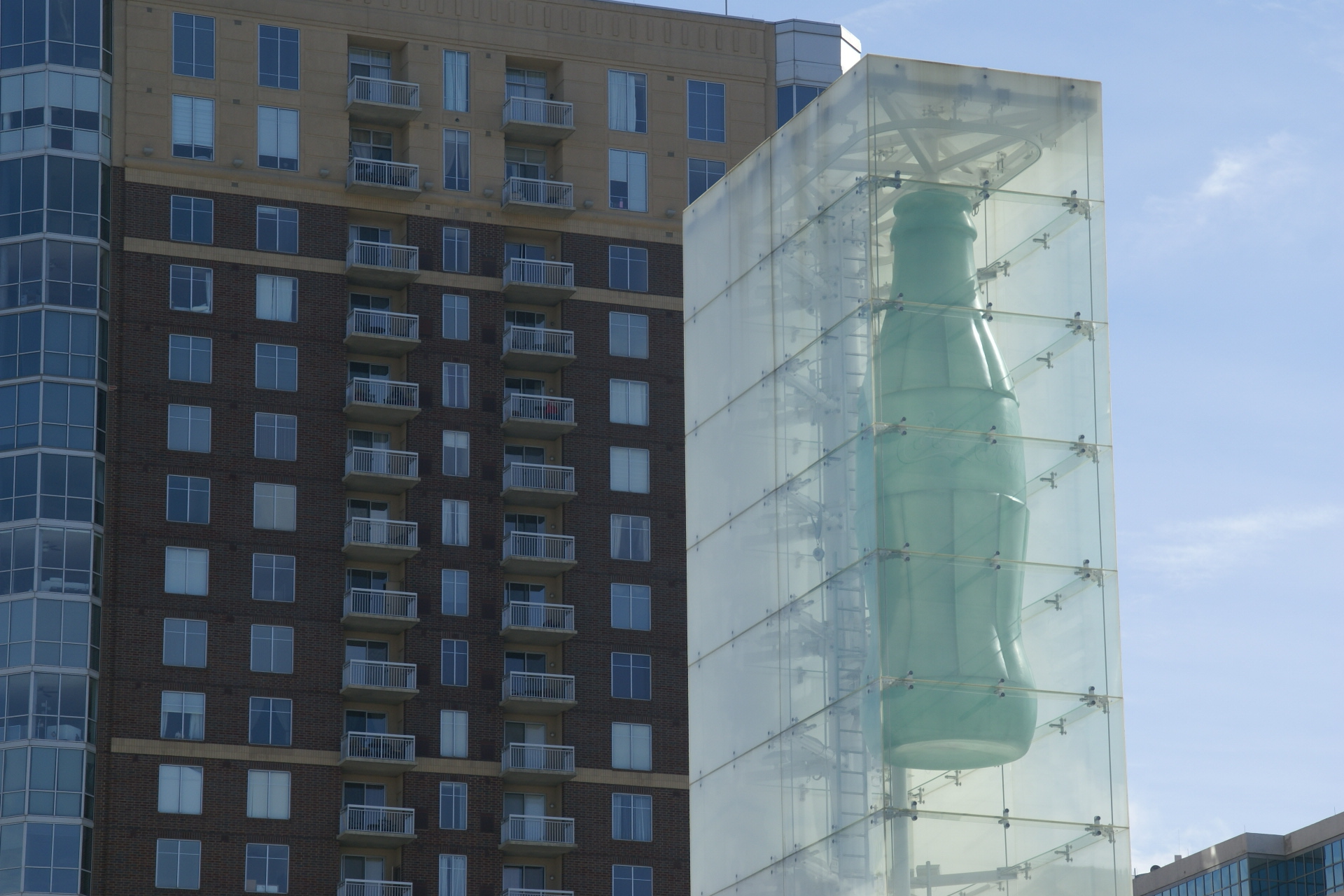
Current World of Coca-Cola in Atlanta, Georgia

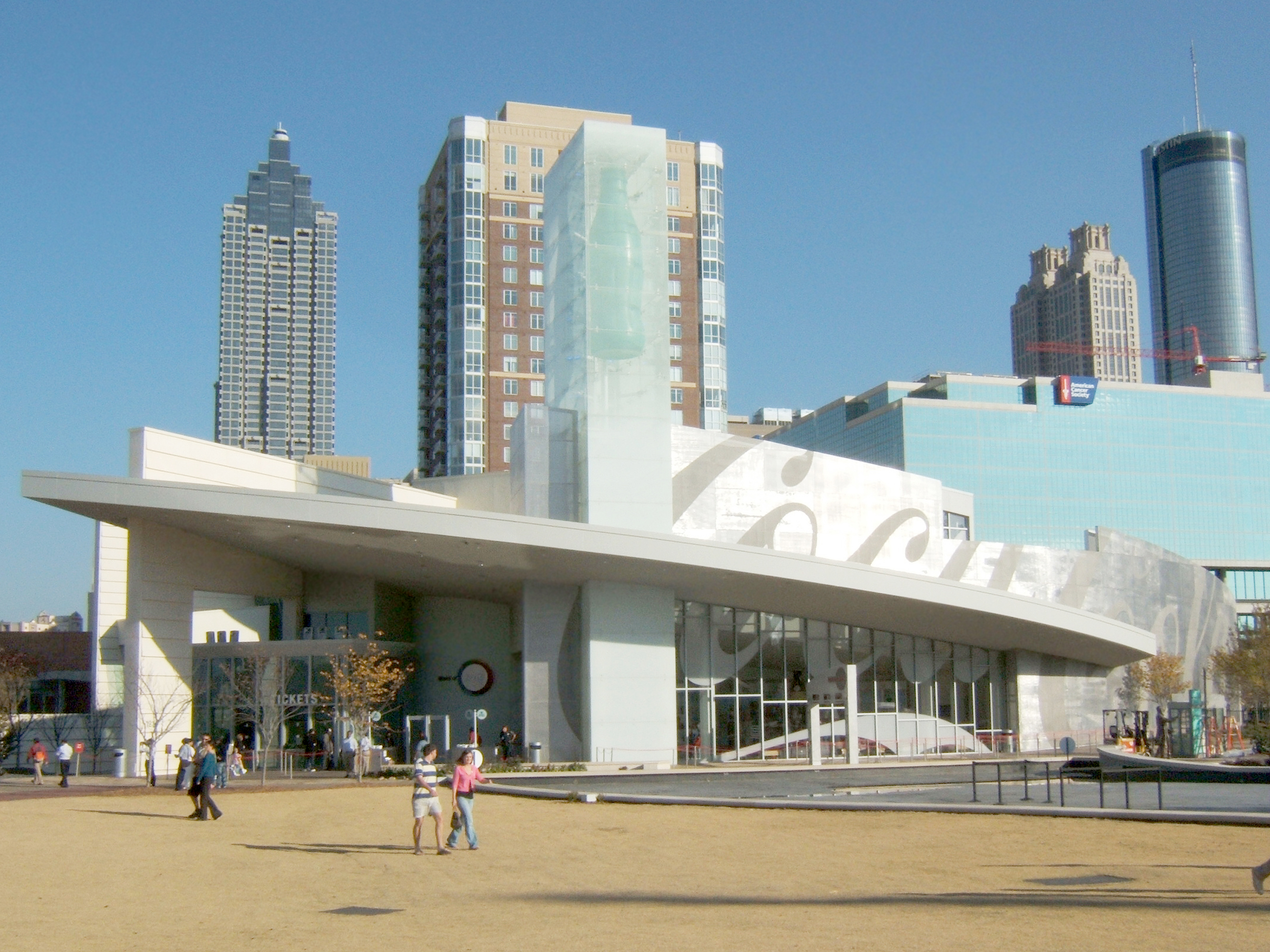
World of Coca-Cola exterior

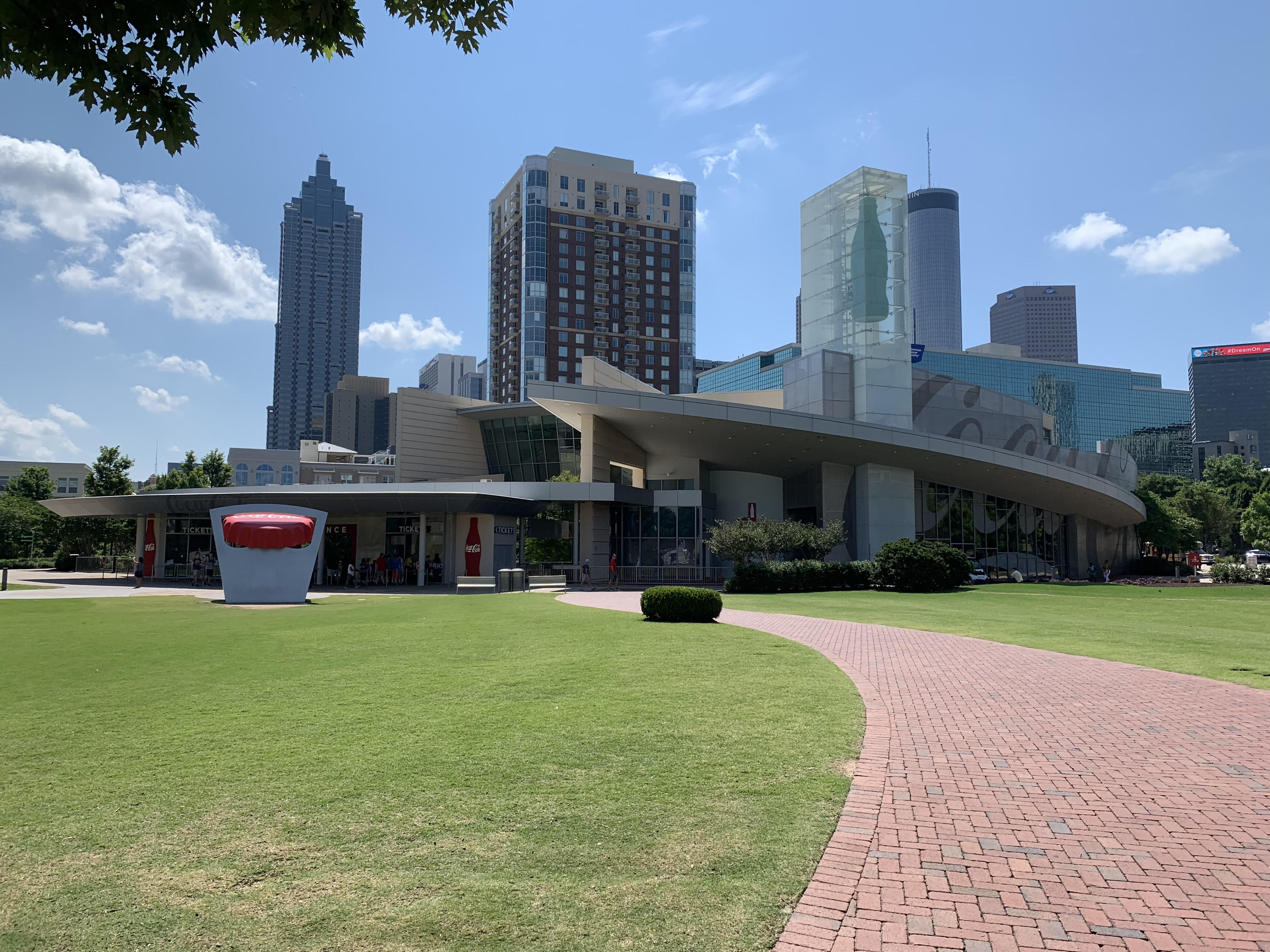
Exterior as seen in June 2019

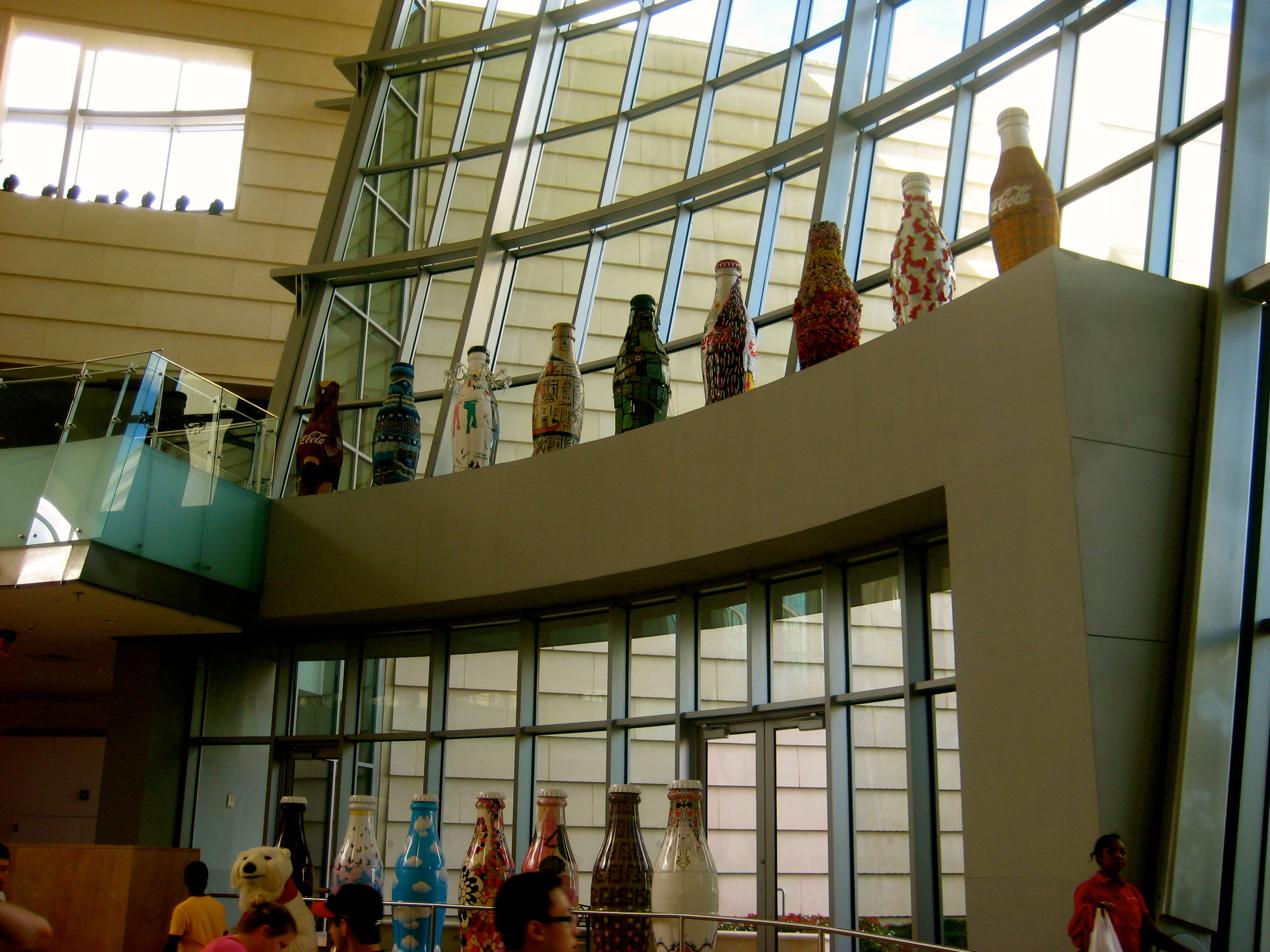
Interior in 2018

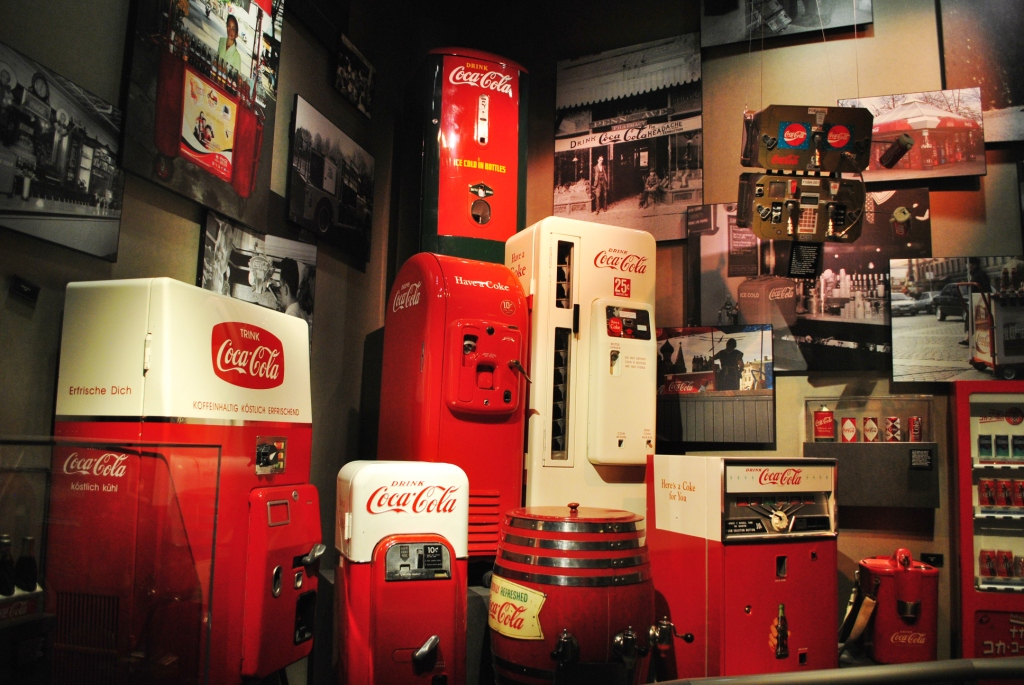
Old machines at the current museum as of 2018

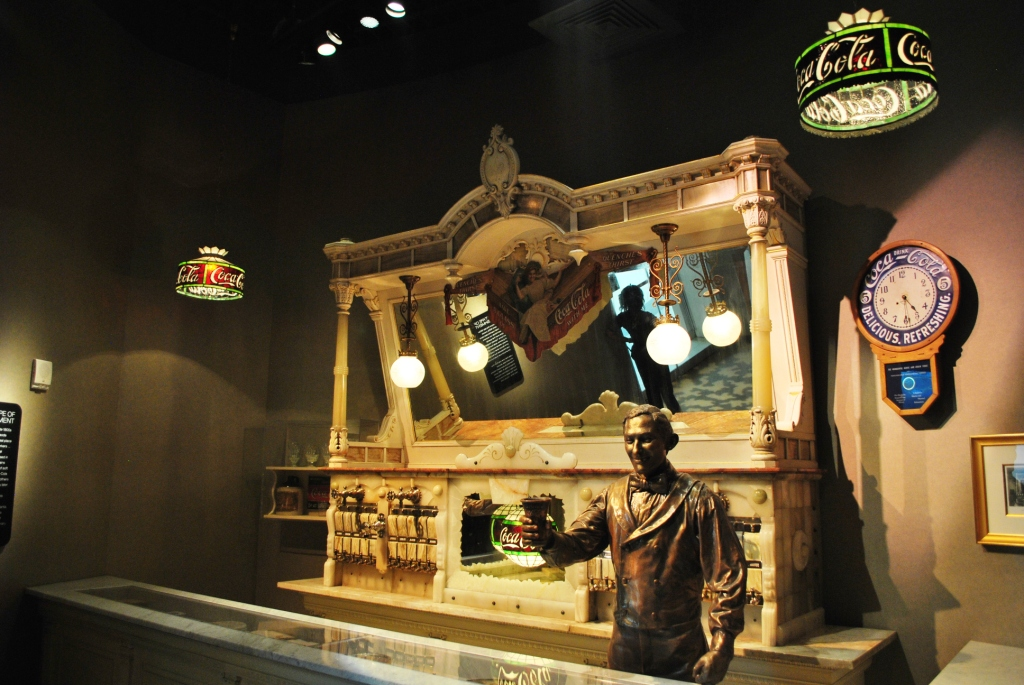
Soda Bar in the exhibit "Milestones of Refreshment" as of 2018

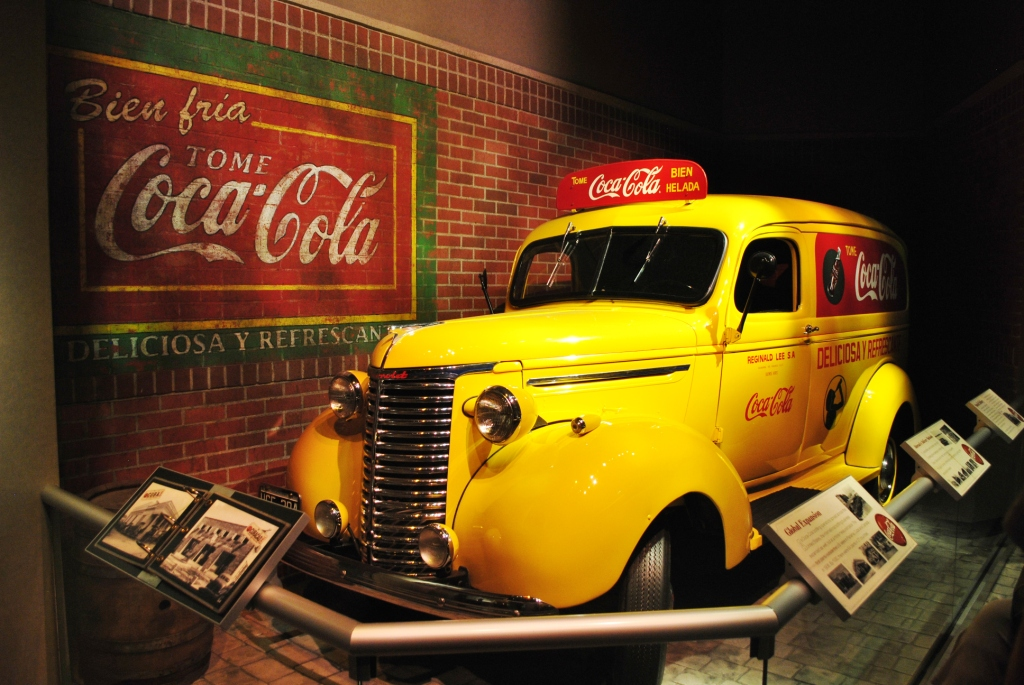
Delivery vehicle in the exhibit "Milestones of Refreshment" as of 2018

== See also ==
- Coca-Cola Museum in Taoyuan City, Taiwan
- List of food and beverage museums
- List of Coca-Cola buildings and structures
- List of Coca-Cola slogans
- Tourism in Atlanta
