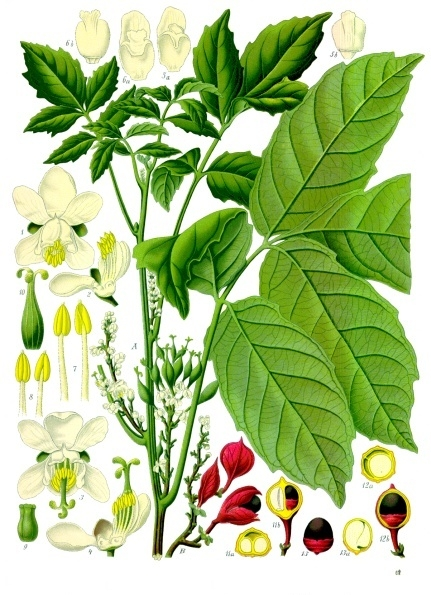

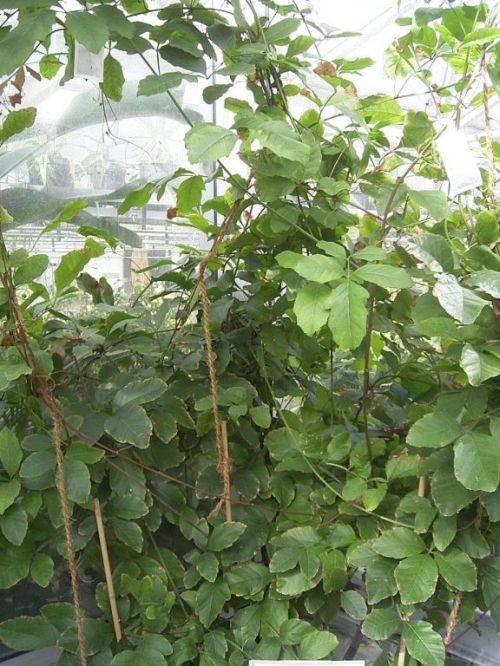

Scientific classification
- Kingdom: Plantae
- Clade: Tracheophytes
- Clade: Angiosperms
- Clade: Eudicots
- Clade: Rosids
- Order: Sapindales
- Family: Sapindaceae
- Genus: Paullinia
- Species: P. cupana

Binomial name
- Paullinia cupana Kunth

= Guarana =

Guaraná

Species of tree

Guaraná (/ɡwəˈrɑːnə/ from the Portuguese guaraná [ɡʷaɾɐˈna]; Paullinia cupana, syns. P. crysan, P. sorbilis) is a climbing plant in the family Sapindaceae, native to the Amazon basin and especially common in Brazil. Guaraná has large leaves and clusters of flowers, and is best known for the seeds from its beans, which are about the size of a coffee bean.

Guaraná is common in soft drinks in Brazil, and is a major source of caffeine for many South Americans. Products containing guaraná can be effective stimulants: the seeds can be up to about 6% caffeine. For comparison, green coffee beans are about 1–3% caffeine. As an additive, it has gained notoriety for being used in energy drinks. As with other plants producing caffeine, the high concentration of caffeine is a defensive toxin that repels insects from the berry and seeds.

The color of the fruit ranges from brown to red and it contains black seeds that are partly covered by white arils. The color contrast when the fruit is split open has been compared with the appearance of eyeballs, and has become the basis of an origin myth among the Sateré-Mawé people.

== History and culture ==
The word guaraná has its origins in the Sateré-Maué word for the plant, warana.

Guaraná plays an important role in Tupi and Guarani culture. According to a myth attributed to the Sateré-Maué tribe, guaraná's domestication originated with a deity killing a beloved village child. To console the villagers, a more benevolent god plucked the left eye from the child and planted it in the forest, resulting in the wild variety of guaraná. The god then plucked the right eye from the child and planted it in the village, giving rise to domesticated guaraná.

The Guaranis make a herbal tea called cupana by shelling, washing and drying the seeds, followed by pounding them into a fine powder. The powder is kneaded into a dough and then shaped into cylinders. This product is known as guaraná bread, which is grated and then immersed into hot water along with sugar.

This plant was introduced to European colonizers and to Europe in the 16th century by Felip Betendorf, Oviedo, Hernández, Cobo and other Spaniard chroniclers. It has since been used, refined, adapted and commercialized by settlers, folklorists, food scientists, and marketers.

== Composition ==
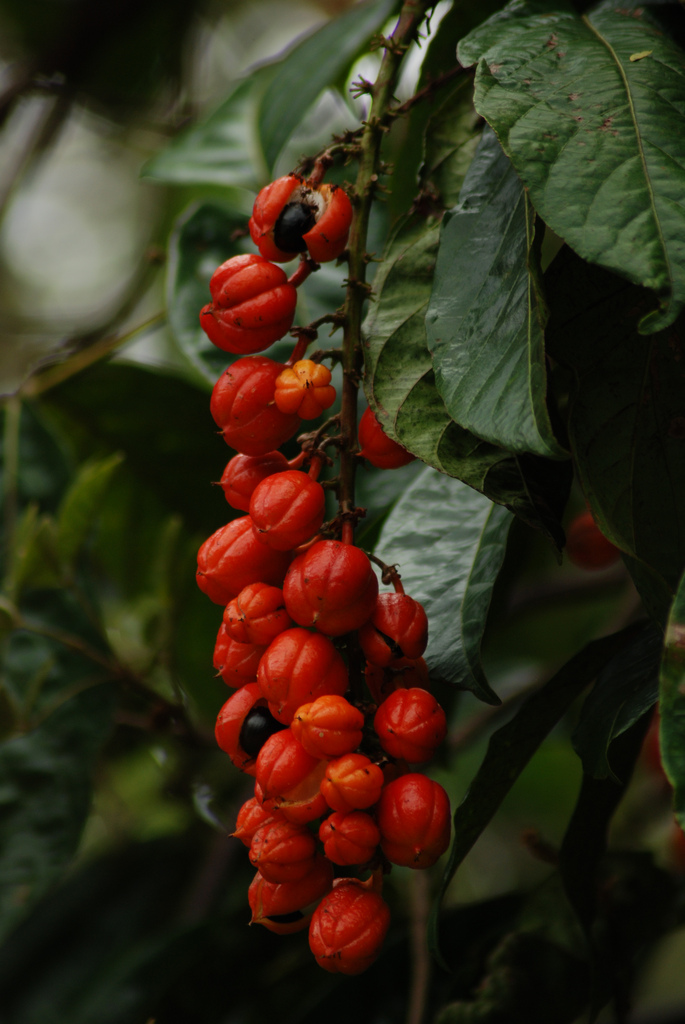
Guaraná fruits

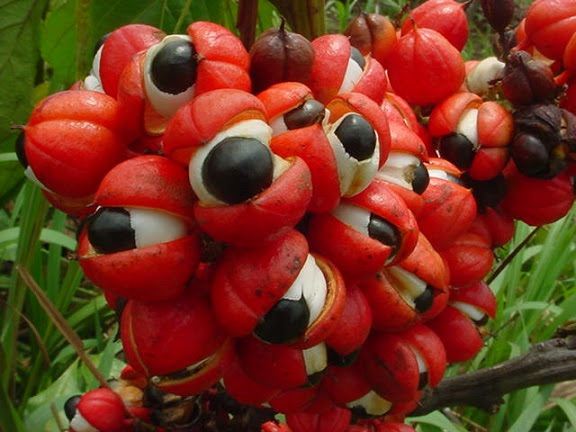
Ripe guaraná fruits resemble human eyes.

Natural sources of caffeine contain widely varying mixtures of xanthine alkaloids other than caffeine, including the cardiac stimulants theophylline, theobromine and other substances such as polyphenols, which can form insoluble complexes with caffeine. The main natural phenols found in guaraná are (+)-catechin and (-)-epicatechin.

The table below contains a partial listing of some of the chemicals found in guaraná seeds, although other parts of the plant also may contain them in varying quantities.

A partial list of the components of guaraná seeds.
Chemical component	Parts per million
Adenine	
Ash	< 14,200
Caffeine (syn. Guaranine)	9,100–76,000
Catechutannic-acid	
Choline	
D-catechin	
Fat	< 30,000
Guanine	
Hypoxanthine	
Mucilage	
Protein	< 98,600
Resin	< 70,000
Saponin	
Starch	50,000–60,000
Tannin	50,000–120,000
Theobromine	200–400
Theophylline	0–2,500
Timbonine	
Xanthine	

== Safety ==
In the United States, guaraná fruit powder and seed extract have not been evaluated for the status of "generally recognized as safe" (GRAS) by the Food and Drug Administration, but rather are approved as food additives for flavor (but not non-flavor) uses.

== Uses ==
=== Soft drinks ===
Brazil, the third-largest consumer of soft drinks in the world, produces several soft drink brands from the seeds of guaraná. A fermented drink is also prepared from guaraná seeds, cassava and water. Paraguay is also a producer of guaraná soft drinks with several brands operating in its market. The word guaraná is widely used in Brazil, Peru and Paraguay as a reference to soft drinks containing guaraná extract.

== See also ==
- Guaraná Antarctica – guaraná flavored soft drink from Brazil
