= Coca-Cola Europacific Aboitiz Philippines =

Philippine subsidiary of Coca-Cola Europacific Partners

Coca-Cola Europacific Aboitiz Philippines, Inc.
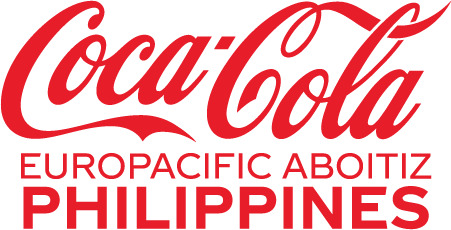
- Formerly: Coca-Cola Bottlers Philippines, Inc. (1981–2013); Coca-Cola FEMSA Philippines, Inc. (2013–2018); Coca-Cola Beverages Philippines, Inc. (2018-2024)
- Type: Subsidiary
- Founded: 1981; 45 years ago
- Headquarters: King's Court Building, Chino Roces Avenue, Makati, Metro Manila, Philippines (2007–2013); 25/F Net Lima Bldg., 5th Ave. corner 26th St.,Bonifacio Global City, Taguig, Metro Manila, Philippines (2013–present)
- Area served: Philippines
- Key people: Gareth McGeown (President and CEO)
- Products: Soft drink Juice; Water; Sports drink Tea
- Owner: The Coca-Cola Company
- Parent: Aboitiz Equity Ventures (40%); Coca-Cola Europacific Partners (60%)
- Website: www.coca-cola.com.ph

Coca-Cola Europacific Aboitiz Philippines, Inc. (CCEAPI, founded as Coca-Cola Bottlers Philippines, Inc.), also formerly known as Coca-Cola Beverages Philippines, Inc. and Coca-Cola FEMSA Philippines, Inc., is a Philippine-based company engaged in the bottling and distribution of Coca-Cola products in the country.

== History ==
In 1927, San Miguel Corporation (then known as the original San Miguel Brewery, Inc.) became the first bottler of Coca-Cola in Asia. In 1981, San Miguel spun off its soft drink businesses to a new company named Coca-Cola Bottlers Philippines, Inc. (CCBPI). The company was established as a joint-venture between San Miguel Corporation (70%) and The Coca-Cola Company (30%).

=== Coca-Cola Amatil (1997) ===
In April 1997, CCBPI was merged into the Australia-based Coca-Cola Amatil Limited (CCA). In effect, San Miguel exchanged its 70% interest in a Philippine-only operation (CCBPI) for a 25% stake in CCA, which had operations in 17 countries—both in the Asia-Pacific region and in Eastern Europe. Shortly after, CCA demerged the Eastern European operations into a UK-based firm called Coca-Cola Beverages plc (resulting in a reduction of San Miguel's stake in CCA to 22%). Seeking to maintain its focus on the Asia-Pacific region, San Miguel sold its stake in the new UK entity in mid-1998.

=== Reacquisition by San Miguel and The Coca-Cola Company (2001) ===
In July 2001, San Miguel joined forces with The Coca-Cola Company (TCCC) to reacquire CCBPI, with San Miguel taking a 65% stake and TCCC the remaining 35%. As part of the deal, San Miguel sold its CCA shares back to CCA. Later in 2001, San Miguel sold its bottled water (Viva! and Wilkins) and juice businesses (Eight O'Clock), amalgamated under Philippine Beverage Partners, Inc., to CCBPI.

In February 2002, San Miguel completed the acquisition of an 83% stake in rival Cosmos Bottling Corporation in a P15 billion ($282 million) deal, completed through CCBPI. Cosmos specialized in low-priced soft drinks and held the number two position in the Philippine market. The combination of Coca-Cola Bottlers Philippines and Cosmos Bottling Corporation gave the San Miguel group control of more than 90% of the Philippine soft-drink market.

=== The Coca-Cola Company (2007) ===
In February 2007, The Coca-Cola Company (TCCC) purchased San Miguel's 65% shareholding in CCBPI and subsidiaries for $590 million acquiring the full ownership. In September 2010, TCCC announced its plan to invest US$1 billion in its business in the Philippines over the next five years. Part of this investment is the completion of its newest and technologically advanced Mega Plant in Misamis Oriental in January 2012.

=== Coca-Cola FEMSA (2013–2018) ===
On December 14, 2012, TCCC signed a definitive agreement to sell its 51% stake in CCBPI to Mexico-based Coca-Cola FEMSA, S.A. de C.V., the world's second largest bottler of Coca-Cola, with operations across Central and South America. The all-cash transaction became effective January 25, 2013. The deal price represented a $1,350 million valuation of CCBPI. Coca-Cola FEMSA will have an option to acquire the remaining 49% of CCBPI at any time during the next 7 years and will have a put option to sell its ownership back to TCCC any time during year six.

On August 17, 2018, The Coca-Cola Company announced that its Bottling Investments Group (BIG) agreed to acquire the 51% stake in the company held by Coca-Cola FEMSA, S.A. de C.V.

=== Coca-Cola BIG (2018–2024) ===
In December 2018, BIG completed its acquisition of Coca-Cola FEMSA Philippines' bottling operations. The company was then renamed Coca-Cola Beverages Philippines, Inc. as a reflection of its ambition to build a total beverages company.

=== Coca-Cola Europacific Partners and the Aboitiz Group (2024-present) ===
On February 23, 2024, Philippine-based Aboitiz Equity Ventures Inc. (AEV) announced that it has jointly acquired Coca-Cola Beverages Philippines Inc. together with Coca-Cola Europacific Partners (CCEP) for $1.8 billion on a debt-free, cash-free basis. It will hold a 40% stake, while CCEP will take up the remaining 60% stake. The company was renamed to Coca-Cola Europacific Aboitiz Philippines, Inc. effective January 15, 2025 to signify the new ownership.

== Brands ==
Carbonated:

- A&W Sarsaparilla (formerly known as Barq's/Sarsi)
- Coca-Cola Original Taste (formerly known as Coca-Cola Classic/Coca-Cola/Coke)
- Coca-Cola Light (formerly known as Diet Coke)
- Coca-Cola Zero Sugar (formerly known as Coca-Cola Zero/Coca-Cola No Sugar)
- Coca-Cola Zero Sugar Vanilla (formerly known as Vanilla Coke/Coca-Cola Vanilla)
- Lift Citrus Blast (formerly known as Sprite Lemon+) (relaunched in Visayas and Mindanao only)
- Lift Berry Bolt
- Royal Tru-Orange
- Royal Tru-Orange Zero Sugar (formerly known as Royal Tru-Orange Light)
- Royal Tru-Grape
- Royal Tru-Lemon (formerly known as Lift/Cheers Lemon/Sparkle/Sparkle Up)
- Royal Tru-Strawberry
- Royal Tru-Lychee
- Sprite
- Sprite Lemon+ (available at Luzon only)
- Sprite Zero Sugar (formerly known as Sprite Light/Diet Sprite/Sprite Zero/Sprite No Sugar)
- Schweppes (soda water, ginger ale and tonic water)

Water:

- Wilkins Distilled (distilled water)
- Wilkins Pure (purified water) (formerly known as First/Safety First)

Energy Drinks:

- Monster Energy Drink (formerly known as Hero/Samurai/Thunder)
- Predator Energy Drink (formerly known as Hero/Samurai)

Juice:

- Minute Maid Nutri+ (formerly known as Minute Maid Pulpy)
- Minute Maid Fresh (formerly known as Hi-C)

Dairy:

- Nutriboost

Tea:

- Real Leaf (tea drink)
- Real Leaf Frutcy (formerly Nestea (ready-to-drink)
- Fuze Tea

Alcoholic beverages:

- Lemon-Dou (Chu-Hi alcoholic lemon cocktail drink)
- Jack Daniel's with Coca-Cola
- Jack Daniel's with Coca-Cola Zero Sugar
- Absolut Vodka with Sprite

Formerly available:

- Aquarius (plain and flavored water)
- Barq's
- Cheers Cherry
- Cheers Lemon
- Cheers Orange
- Cherry Coke
- Coca-Cola Classic/Coca-Cola/Coke (renamed: as Coca-Cola Original Taste since 2017-2018 and 2019 and Coca-Cola Original Taste Less Sugar since 2018-2019)
- Coca-Cola thêm Cà Phê (also known as Coca-Cola with Coffee)
- Coca-Cola Life
- Coca-Cola Light with Lemon
- Coca-Cola No Sugar (renamed: Coca-Cola Zero Sugar since 2021)
- Coca-Cola Vanilla (replaced with Coca-Cola Zero Sugar Vanilla since 2022)
- Coca-Cola Zero (renamed: Coca-Cola Zero Sugar since 2017-2019 and 2021 and Coca-Cola No Sugar since 2019-2021)
- Diet Coke (renamed: Coca-Cola Light since 2002)
- Earth & Sky (iced tea drink mix)
- Eight O'Clock Iced Tea (instant iced tea drink mix)
- Eight O'Clock Juice (instant juice drink mix)
- Fanta Calamansi
- Fanta Fruit Punch
- Fanta Grape
- Fanta Green Apple
- Fanta Lemon
- Fanta Mango
- Fanta Root Beer
- First/Safety First (replaced with Wilkins Pure since 2013)
- Hero Energy Drink (replaced with Predator Energy Drink since 2024)
- Hi-C (replaced with Minute Maid Fresh since 2014 and 2016)
- Jaz Cola
- Lift Lemon Soda
- Magnolia/Eight O'Clock Fun-Chum
- Magnolia Fruit Drink (returned to Ginebra San Miguel since 2007 and San Miguel Brewery since 2015)
- Magnolia Hi-C
- Magnolia Junior Juice
- Magnolia Zip
- Mello Yello
- Mello Yello Piñacolada
- Minute Maid Pulpy (renamed: Minute Maid Nutri+ since 2022)
- Nestea (ready-to-drink), (sold to Asia Brewery since 2013) - under license by Nestlé, (replaced with Real Leaf Frutcy since 2011)
- Nestea Blast (ready to drink iced tea in pouch)
- Nestea Ready To Drink in Can (joint-venture with Nestlé Philippines)
- Ponkana (tangerine drink mix)
- Pop Cola
- Pop Cola Light/Diet Pop Cola
- Powerade (in the CCEAP website, the Powerade logo still appears)
- Rani Float – under license
- Royal (soda water, ginger ale and tonic water)
- Royal Rootbeer
- Royal Wattamelon
- Royal Tru-Orange Light (renamed: Royal Tru-Orange Zero Sugar since 2024)
- Royal Tru-Dalandan
- Samurai (replaced with Predator Energy Drink since 2024)
- Sarsi (replaced with A&W Sarsaparilla since 2024)
- Sarsi Light/Diet Sarsi
- Sparkle/Sparkle Up (replaced with Royal Tru-Lemon since 2012 and 2019)
- Sprite Ice
- Sprite LeBron James Mix (Limited Edition)
- Sprite Lemon+ (replaced with Lift since 2025 in Visayas and Mindanao, Sprite Lemon+ still available in Luzon markets)
- Sprite Light/Diet Sprite
- Sprite No Sugar (renamed: Sprite Zero Sugar 2022)
- Sprite Zero (renamed: Sprite Zero Sugar since 2017-2020 and 2022 and Sprite No Sugar since 2020-2022)
- Tab (diet cola)
- Thunder Super Soda (replaced with Monster Energy Drink since 2024)
- Vanilla Coke (replaced with Coca-Cola Zero Sugar Vanilla since 2022)
- Viva! (mineral water)
- Wilkins Delight (water-based drink with real fruit juice)
- Wilkins Sparkling (plain and flavored)

== See also ==
- Powerade Tigers
- Powerade Team Pilipinas
