= Sparkle (drink) =

Lemon-flavored soft drink

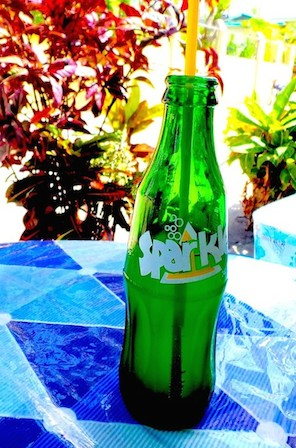
- Type: Soft drink
- Manufacturer: Cosmos Bottling Corporation (original); Coca-Cola Bottlers Philippines, Inc.
- Origin: Philippines
- Introduced: 1990s
- Discontinued: 2022
- Related products: Fanta, Sprite, Lift, Mello Yello, Mountain Dew, Juicy Lemon

Sparkle is a lemon-flavored soft drink produced and distributed by Cosmos Bottling Corporation (a then subsidiary of RFM Corporation) for the provincial markets of the Philippines. RFM Corporation sold their soft drink division Cosmos Bottling Corporation to Coca-Cola Bottlers Philippines Inc. in 2001. The brand was discontinued by Coca-Cola Beverages Philippines in 2022 and replaced by Royal Tru-Lemon (2019), Sprite Lemon+ (2022) and its former predecessor Lift (2025).

== Nutritional Value ==
Sparkle
Nutritional value per 240 ml
- Energy: 246 kcal (1,030 kJ)
- Carbohydrates: 48 g
- Dietary fiber: 0 g
- Fat: 3 g
- Saturated: 0 g
- Trans: 0 g
- Monounsaturated: 0 g
- Polyunsaturated: 0 g
- Protein: 5 g
Vitamins and minerals
Vitamins	Quantity %DV^{†}
Vitamin A equiv.	0% 0 μg
Vitamin C	0% 0 mg
Minerals	Quantity %DV^{†}
Calcium	0% 0 mg
Iron	0% 0 mg
Potassium	0% 0 mg
Sodium	11% 246 mg
- Other constituents: Quantity
- Cholesterol: 0 mg
- ^{†}Percentages estimated using US recommendations for adults, except for potassium, which is estimated based on expert recommendation from the National Academies.
