= Lift (drink) =

Range of soft drinks

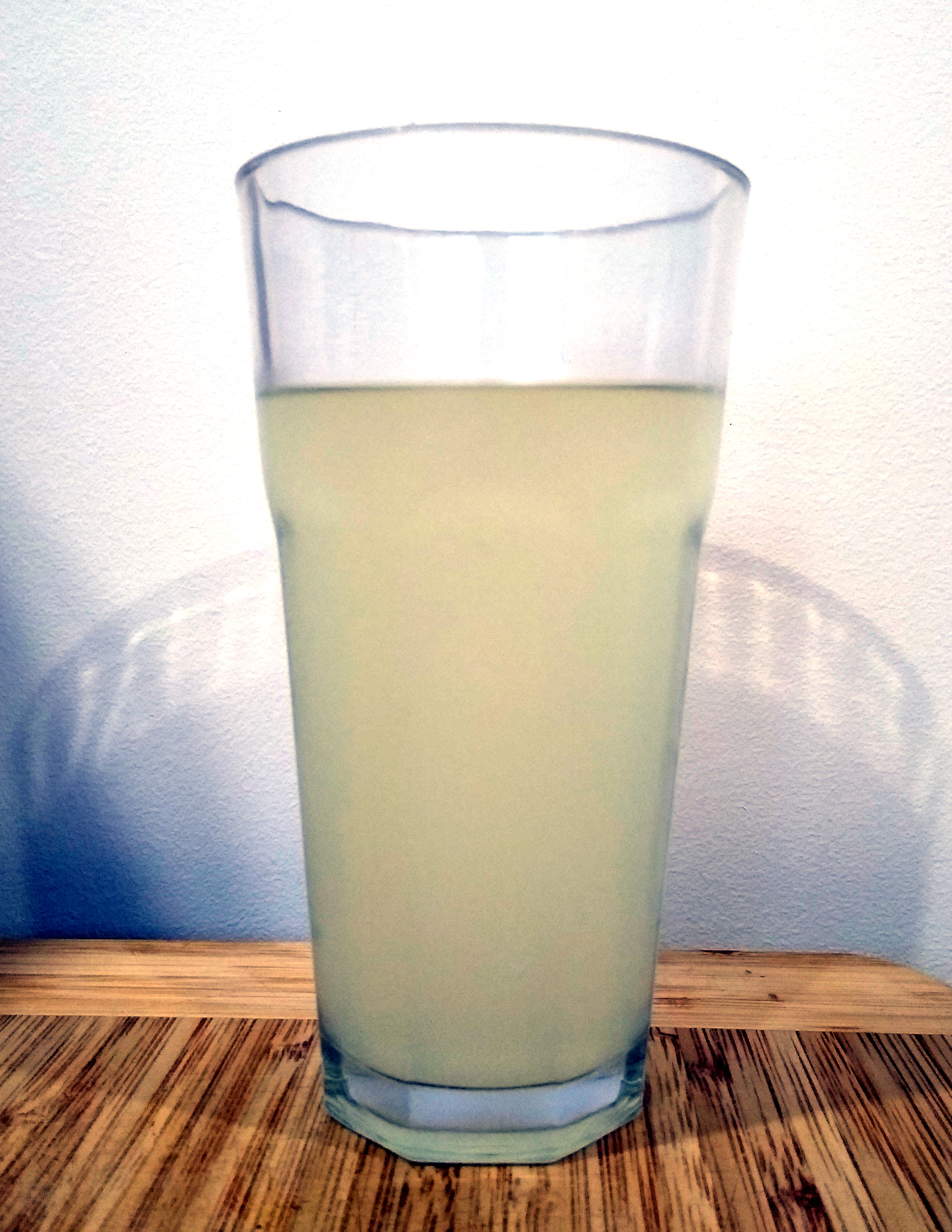
- Origin: Australia
- Introduced: 1974; 51 years ago 1990; 35 years ago (Australia); 1994; 31 years ago (Philippines, relaunched in 2025)
- Discontinued: 2022 (Australia)
- Color: Yellow; Golden Brown; Red
- Flavor: Lemon (Australia, New Zealand and Philippines); Apple (Germany and Chile); Strawberry (Philippines)

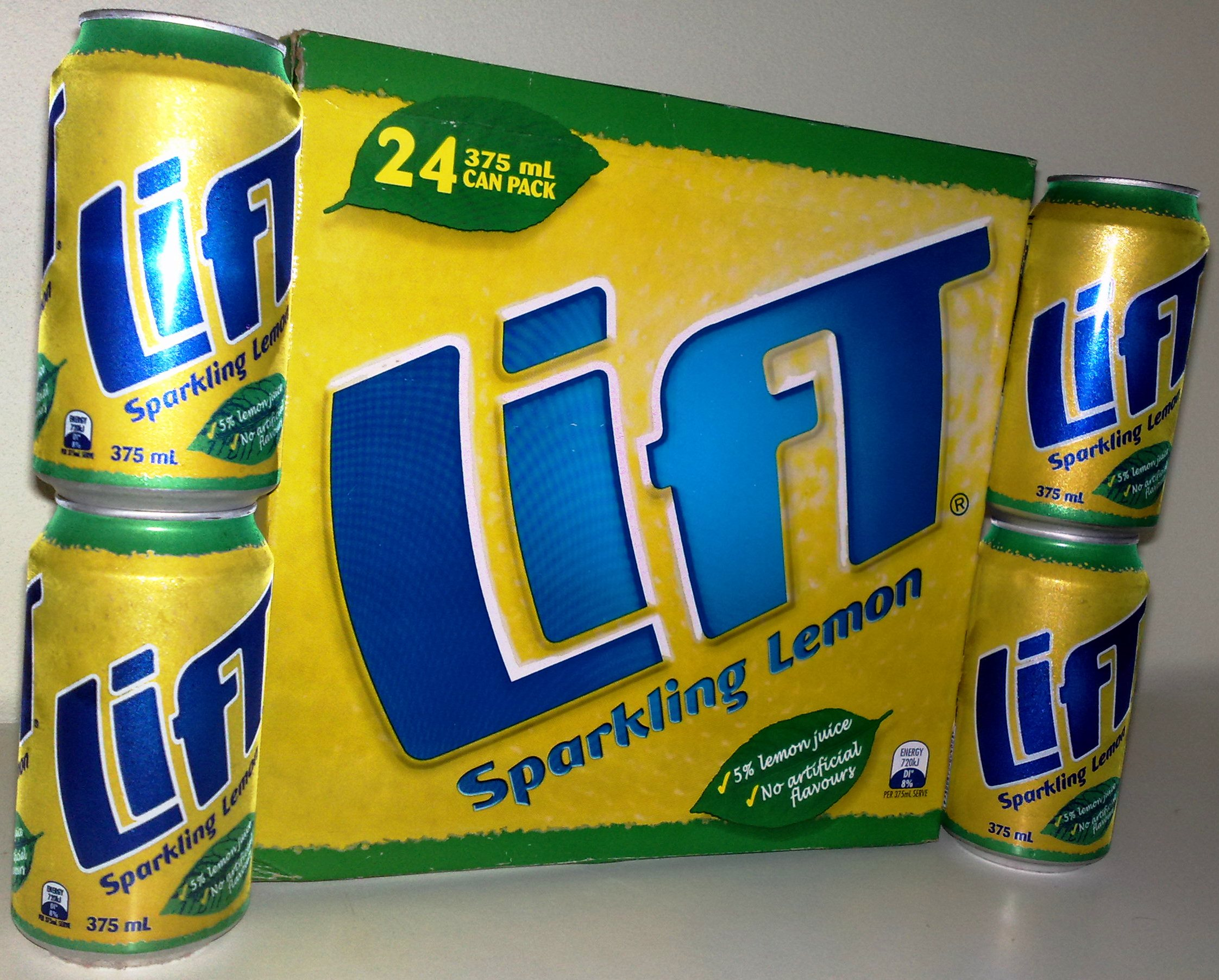
Cans and carton of Lift before 2015 rebranding

Lift is a range of soft drinks produced by The Coca-Cola Company that has been available in Australia, New Zealand, Chile, Germany, Austria, Philippines and Eastern Europe since the 1970s. It is carbonated and flavored with fruit juice. In Australia and New Zealand, a standard bottle of Lift is lemon flavored, whereas in Germany and other markets the default flavor is Apple, while in the Philippines, it is marketed as a caffeinated soft drink and comes in Lemon (marketed as Citrus Blast) and Strawberry (marketed Berry Blast) flavors.

Lift Apple and Lift Lemon were previously part of eight international soda flavors featured and available for tasting at Club Cool in Epcot.

== History ==
=== Australia and New Zealand ===
Lift was introduced in Australia and New Zealand in the 1990s as a replacement for the Mello Yello brand. Mello Yello had replaced Leed Lemon Soda Squash in the early 1980s, which was a variant of the Leed Lemonade brand. The only flavour in the Lift range (besides limited time flavours) was Lemon. In 2015 it was rebranded as Fanta Lemon Lift and then back to the original Lift in 2016 with a flavour change, supposedly making the drink more sour.

Lift was discontinued in the Australian market in September 2022 and replaced by a new lemon flavour of Sprite with caffeine, known as Sprite Lemon+. This flavour was announced by Coca-Cola Europacific Partners on 13 September 2022, following months of rumours on social media. Rumours also spread around this time claiming that Lift would be discontinued across New Zealand. As a result, Coca-Cola released a statement saying that it would not be discontinued in New Zealand.

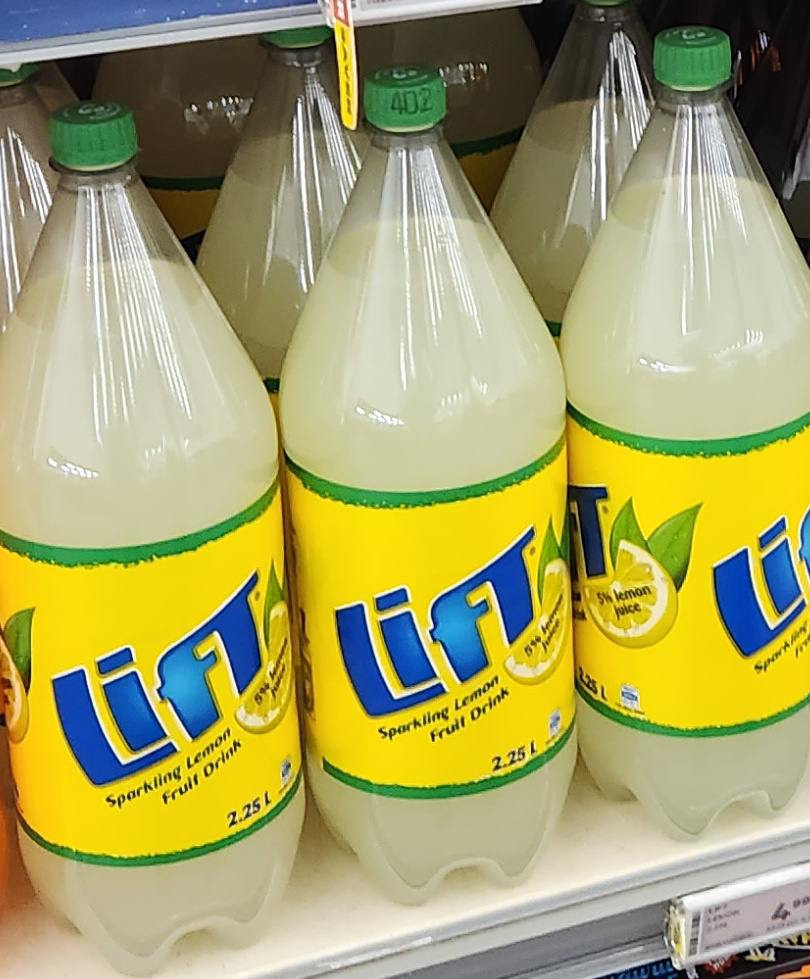
Lift on sale in a New World supermarket

=== Germany ===
Lift was originally introduced in Germany in 1974 with lemon juice.

In Germany, Lift Apfelschorle consists of 55% apple juice and water without additional flavouring. Variations include Lift Apfel und Grapefruit, which contains apple and grapefruit juice.

=== Philippines ===
Lift was launched in the Philippines in April 1994 with Lift Lemon as the replacement of Mello Yello in the Philippines but was discontinued in the early 2000s and later replaced by Sparkle when Coca-Cola Bottlers Philippines (now Coca-Cola Europacific Aboitiz Philippines) acquired Cosmos Bottling Corporation from RFM Corporation alongside its products Sarsi, Pop Cola, Jaz Cola and Cheers.

In 2025, Coca-Cola Europacific Aboitiz Philippines relaunched Lift in the Philippines in its Western Visayas and Negros Island Region market and now coexists with Royal Tru-Lemon.

== See also ==
- Appletiser
- Solo (Australian soft drink)
