= Frescolita =

Venezuelan cola

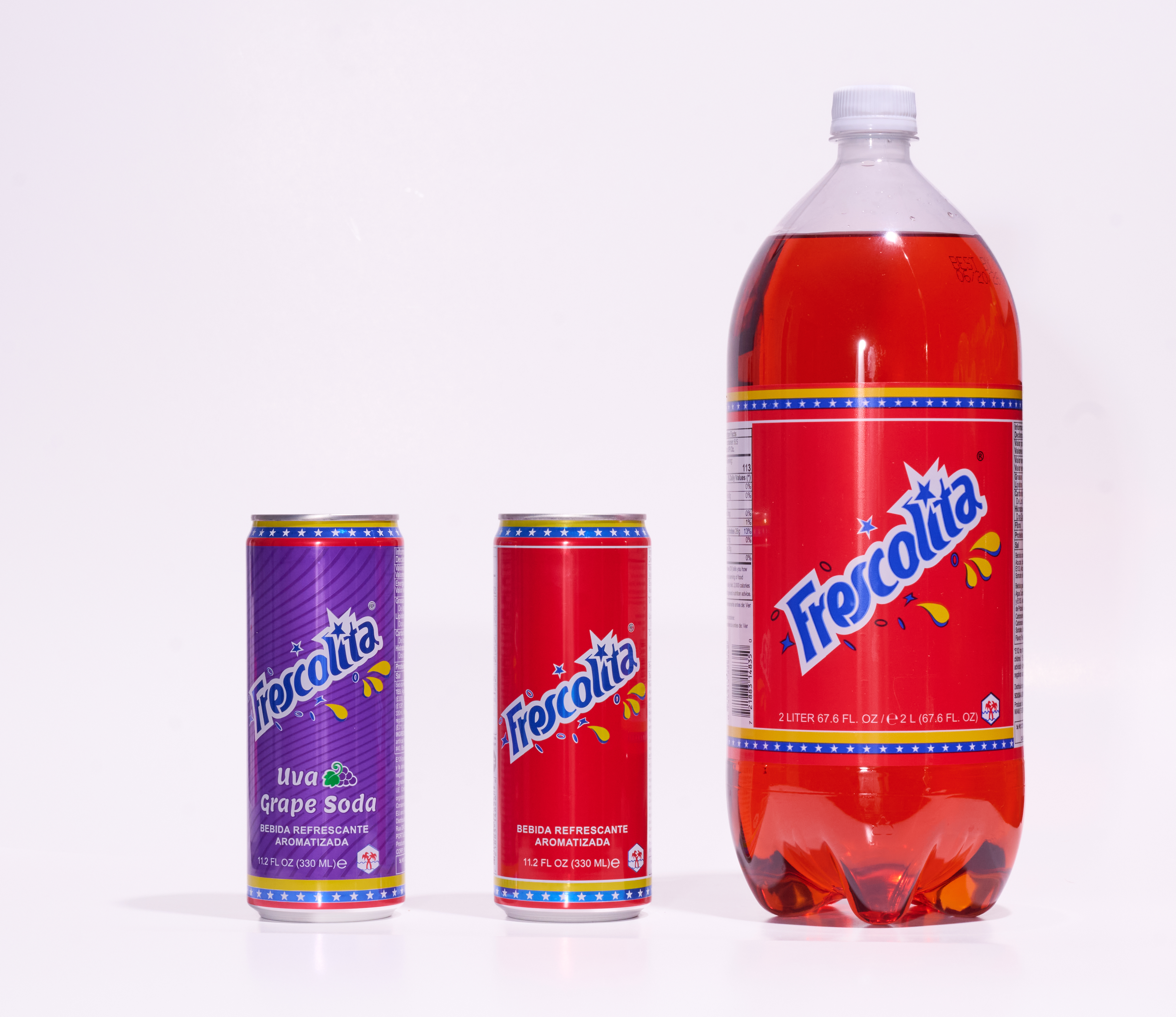
- Frescolita assortment. Original, Uva (grape), 2L
- Type: Soft drink
- Manufacturer: Coca-Cola FEMSA Venezuela
- Origin: Venezuelan
- Introduced: 1982
- Colour: Red-orange
- Flavour: cream soda, bubble gum

Frescolita is a Venezuelan cola. It is very similar to red cream sodas in the United States, with a taste similar to bubble gum. Besides Venezuela, it is available in stores that specialize in Latin American groceries in the United States, Latin America and Europe. It is typically enjoyed at birthdays and parties. In some parts of Venezuela, it is sometimes used in cooking or baking, such as in a torta de Frescolita (Frescolita cake).

While by 2002 Coca-Cola was consumed more, it was reported that Frescolita took more of the general soft-drinks market of the country. Up to 45% of Coca-Cola's sales of soft drinks in Venezuela is in Hit, Frescolita and Chinotto.

It is sold by Coca-Cola FEMSA. Unlike many other soft drinks throughout the Americas, Frescolita is not very sweet.
