= Solo (Australian soft drink) =

Australian lemon-flavoured soft drink

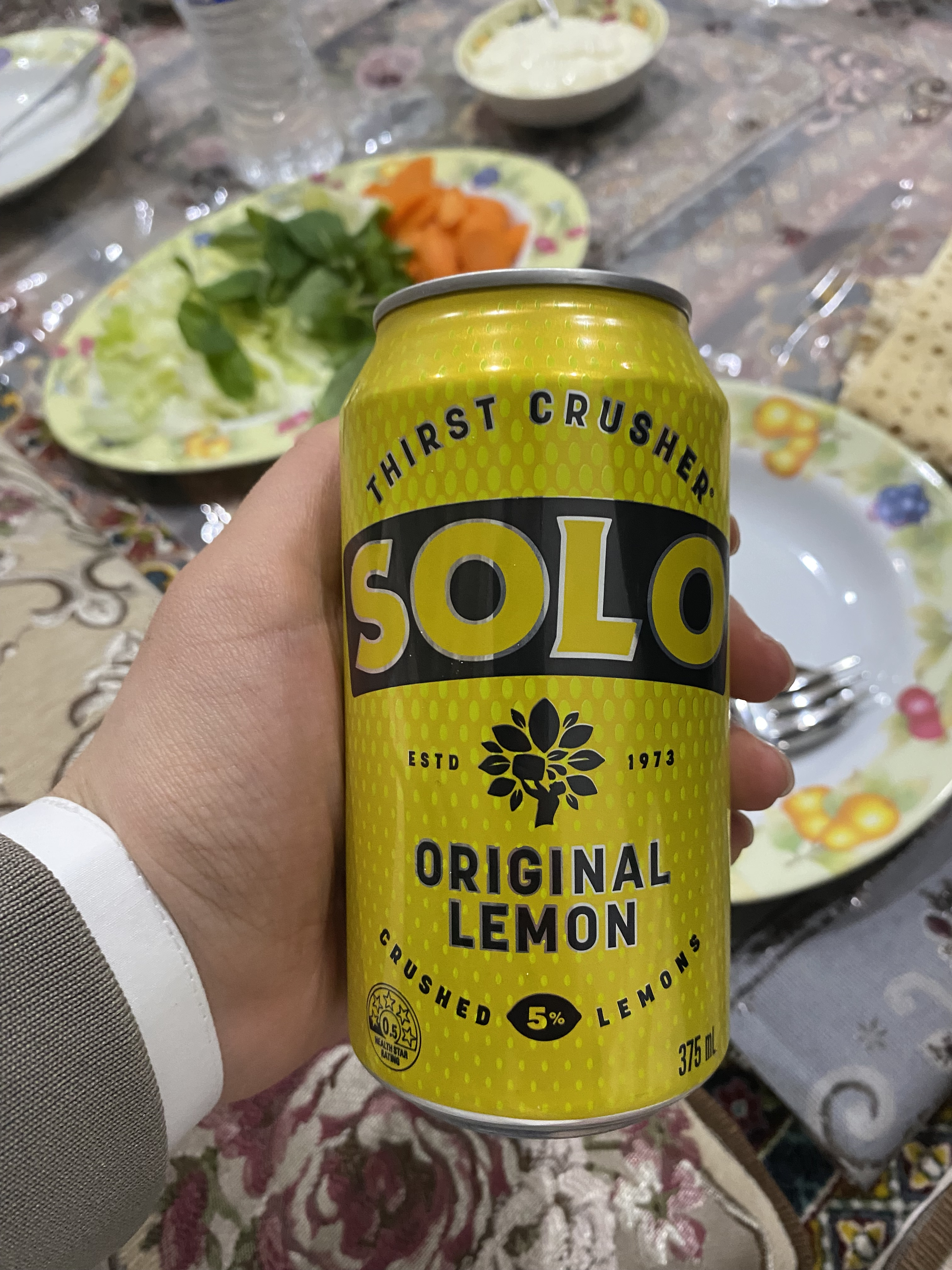
- A can of Solo
- Type: Soft drink
- Manufacturer: Asahi Breweries
- Origin: Australia
- Introduced: 1973; 53 years ago
- Colour: White
- Flavour: Lemon
- Variants: Solo Original; Solo Sub; Solo Strong; Solo Lemon & Lime; Solo Low Carb; Solo Guarana; Solo Brew; Solo Zero Sugar; Solo Lemon Mango Zero Sugar; Hard Rated; Solo Lemon Pineapple Zero Sugar; Solo Energy; Solo Lemon Orange Zero Sugar

Solo
Nutritional value per 1 can (375 mL)
- Energy: 750 kJ (180 kcal)
- Carbohydrates: 43.1 g
- Sugars: 43.1 g
- Fat: 0 g
- Protein: 0.2 g
Vitamins and minerals
| Minerals | Quantity %DV^{†} |
| Sodium | 3% 68 mg |
- ^{†}Percentages estimated using US recommendations for adults.

Solo is an Australian, lemon-flavoured, carbonated soft drink currently manufactured under license by Asahi Breweries. First launched by Tarax in 1968 and fell to Cadbury after a takeover in 1974, its lemon flavour is inspired by Australian pubs' traditional and popular non-alcoholic 'pub squash' beverage. The drink's recognition amongst the Australian population has been attributed to the brand's long lasting "Solo Man" marketing campaign, featuring numerous Australian actors. Solo and Asahi Holdings operates in the soft drink manufacturing industry along with various other brands such as Coca-Cola. The usual 375mL can of Solo contains 43.1 grams of sugar. There are and have been in the past, various versions of Solo available. These most notably include Solo Zero, which uses artificial sweetener instead of sugar, and Hard Rated, an alcoholic variant. There is also an energy drink version called ‘Solo Energy’, released approximately in June 2025.

== History ==
Solo was first launched by Tarax in 1968, then Cadbury-Schweppes took over in 1973. In April 2009, Asahi acquired Cadbury-Schweppes Australia and in turn Solo.

The drink's lemon flavour is derived from Australian pubs' traditional non-alcoholic beverage 'pub squash' or 'lemon squash', which is a drink made from a sweetened lemon concentrate and water. Solo is a carbonated variant of a lemon squash.

In the past, Solo has come out with different variants of its original lemon flavour, namely a lemon lime flavour and zero sugar, which uses artificial sweetener as a substitute for sugar.

In response to concerns associated with high sugar content, Asahi beverages and subsequently Solo signed a sugar reduction pledge in 2018. Solo aims to reduce its sugar content by 20% by the year 2025.

Solo Energy, an energy drink range with guarana, caffeine and B-vitamins, was released in June 2025. It is available in full sugar and zero sugar versions.

== Hard Rated ==
An alcoholic variant of the drink called Hard Rated contains an ABV of 4.5% or approximately 1.3 standard drinks per 375ml can. Launched in July 2023 as "Hard Solo", the Alcohol Beverages Advertising Code concluded in November that Carlton & United Breweries (CUB) had breached part of the code after it received complaints that the branding of the drink appealed to minors. Asahi Breweries, owners of CUB Premium Beverages, argued that Hard Solo cans were distinct enough from the regular variety that consumers would find it hard to confuse the two, with the Hard version sporting primarily black packaging and prominent alcoholic markings. Despite this, CUB announced in November 2023 that it would rename the drink to Hard Rated. An orange flavoured version of Hard Rated was released in August 2025. A Passionfruit flavoured version was further released the following year August 2026.

As of August 2026, the Hard Rated range includes:

- Lemon 4.5%
- Lemon 4.5% Zero Sugar
- Lemon 6%
- Lemon Lime 4.5% Zero Sugar
- Lemon Lime 6%
- Orange 4.5%
- Orange Passionfruit 4.5%

== Marketing ==
=== Solo Man ===
Solo Man is a marketing campaign which began in the 1970s after the release of the drink. The most recent Solo Man advertisement was released in 2018. The Solo Man marketing campaign tracks an Australian man partaking in adventurous and extreme sports in order to ‘earn’ the drink. Solo Man historically has been portrayed as masculine. The 2018 “thirst worthy effort” campaign launched by TBWA\Melbourne redefines the Solo Man by partaking in more domestic activities.

Activities in which the Solo Man would partake in with their relevant YouTube videos are listed:

- Kayaking down rapids
- Riding a wagon towed by horses
- Riding a catamaran
- Driving a yellow speed boat
- Wrestling a brumby
- Playing squash
- Horse riding
- Fishing for a shark
- Windsurfing
- Arm wrestling
- Doing a triathlon
- Safety rafting down rapids
- Kayaking off a cliff
- Wrestling a saltwater crocodile
- Driving a Jeep through a store
- Fixing a jetty as a carpenter and wakeboarding on an esky lid
- Dragging a shark home
- Chasing a barrel of lemons

Ad slogans including "The thirst crusher" and "Light on the fizz, so you can slam it down fast" were used in advertising until the early 1990s. A tag line common in the television advertisements in the 1970s and 1980s was: "You've never tasted a lemon drink like Solo before. Unless it's one of those great lemon squashes that pubs used to make. Extra lemon tang, and not too many bubbles. Solo lemon: a man's drink.".

In 2012, the Solo Man was re-introduced by BMF advertising agency as part of a new Solo advertising campaign, and starred Adam Demos. This is the origin story of the Solo Man who is swinging an axe in colonial Australia, puts lemons in a barrel that rolls away and gives chase down hills, later chugging the entire barrel himself in the Solo Man stance. In this year, BMF also created a new tagline for Solo: “Go hard, go solo”. This involved Solo Man partaking in an obstacle course to earn the drink. In this year, BMF also introduced limited edition designs on solo cans as a social media promotion strategy. It involved the cans’ design having one letter or a hashtag out of the 7 potentials: #, G, O, H, A, R, D.

In 2018, Solo changed the original character traits of Solo Man by portraying him with a less macho presentation. In these commercials he is a dad who makes costumes for a play, has a dog and puts together flat pack furniture. It came with the tag line "A Thirst Worthy Effort".

==== Solo Man actors ====
The first "Solo Man" character was acted by Michael Ace, a former PE Teacher at St Paul's Catholic college in Manly, on Sydney's Northern beaches. Ace had a second career as a model and starred as Solo Man in the 70s and 80s.

Another Solo Man was Terry Creasey, the father of Australian actor and television presenter Joel Creasey. Terry Creasey was also a male model and starred as Solo Man in the 1980s. Terry Creasey featured as the Solo Man who runs up a hill with a dog and drinks a can of Solo at the top.

In the mid 1980s, Mark Robert Coutelas also acted as Solo Man, donning a moustache and a mullet, featuring in the ad where Solo Man kayaks of a cliff face and white water rafting down rapids.

In 2012, Australian actor Adam Demos featured as Solo Man. Adam Demos' Solo Man was the one who chased a barrel full of lemons down a hill and drank/poured the lemon juice over him on the top of a cliff.

=== Sport sponsorship ===
In 2009, Schweppes Australia commenced a three-year partnership deal with Football Australia, whereby the 'Goal of the Year' was known as 'SOLO Goal of the year. BMF advertising featured Australian football player Harry Kewell. This campaign was an attempt to bring 'crushed can football' back to Australian streets. This game involves crushing a Solo can after finishing the drink and kicking it around on the street.

In 2010, prior to the Football world cup in South Africa, Solo and BMF launched an online campaign called 'lucky undies' in support of the Australian soccer team Socceroos. This campaign involved the production of 225,000 garments of yellow underwear to be sold online or with the drink. Paired with a 1-minute advertisement on TV, the rest of the marketing was left to social media. The result of this was a subsequent 31,000 fan film views on social media. On May 24, 2010, spectators of a Socceroos match held in Melbourne were handed these bright yellow underwear to wear over their clothes.

=== Masculinity in marketing ===
Positioned as a highly masculine drink, Solo adopts masculine marketing techniques and targets a male audience in their brand image, advertising campaigns and television commercials. This marketing strategy incorporates techniques such as portraying men through "bravery, adventurousness, being able to think rationally, being strong and effective".

Historically, Solo's advertising techniques have been focused on the traditional and stereotypical aspects of masculinity in their marketing campaigns. The macho nature of the Solo Man is evident in the character partaking in extreme sports in order to ‘earn’ the drink. The portrayal of Solo Man follows common techniques used in gender advertisements. These techniques include men being alert and conscious of surroundings, standing upright, gripping things tightly with their hands, eyes open and looking around, controlled bodies, being serious and being physically active. Since being launched, Solo has progressed this masculine advertising through different extreme sporting adventures.

Solo's marketing campaign predominantly focuses on the male demographic in Australia. The reasoning for this can be attributed to the fact that in Australia in the 2017–2018 period, men were two times more likely to have a soft drink per day compared to women.

Since 2018, Solo's “thirst worthy effort” campaign produced by TBWA adapted the activities of Solo Man. The advertising redefines the Solo Man to partake in more domestic and household activities, such as constructing furniture and making costumes for a school play.

== Ingredients ==
=== Listed ingredients ===
- Carbonated water
- Sugar
- Reconstituted lemon juice (5%)
- Food acids (330, 331)
- Natural flavour
- Preservative (211)
- Natural colour (safflower extract)

=== Additives ===
- E330 - Citric acid
- E331 - Sodium citrates
- E211 - Sodium benzoate

A typical 375 mL can of Solo contains 43.1 grams of sugar, 0 grams of fat, 0.2 grams of protein and 68 milligrams of sodium, containing 750 kJ of energy.

== Competitors ==
In Australia, Solo competes with various other soft drinks that offer different flavours and prices. In 2020, Asahi Holdings (which owns Solo) held 15.4% market share in the Australian soft drink manufacturing market. Coca-Cola Amatil Limited owned the majority of the market at 39.8% market share. Solo mainly competes with brands owned by Coca-Cola Amatil Limited, namely Coca-Cola, Fanta, Sprite and Kirks. Smaller brands also compete with Solo such as soft drinks owned by Tru Blu Beverages (namely Pub Squash, Pips and Vida), which have 4–5% market share, and Bundaberg Brewed Drinks Pty Ltd, who have 3–4% market share.

== Overseas markets ==
Cadbury Schweppes sold a similar citrus drink named Rondo in the United States market during the late 1970s and '80s.

Using the Australian Solo as an inspiration, Cadbury-Schweppes has also sold an energy drink in the U.S. called Coolah Energy. Similar to Solo, its listed ingredients included lemon flavour but with 150 mg of caffeine. It used the tagline "Energy from Down Under" and listed boronia as an ingredient, a citrus plant in Australia known more worldwide for use in floral arrangements than its fruit or energy. Coolah Energy has since been discontinued.

== See also ==
- Sprite Lemon+
