= Max Keith =

German businessman and inventor (1903–1974)

Max Keith (/kaɪt/ KYTE; 1903–1974) was a German businessman who headed the German branch of the Coca-Cola Company during World War II. He is best known for creating the soft drink Fanta.

== Career ==
Keith began working at Coca-Cola GmbH, the German subsidiary of the Coca-Cola Company, in 1933 and became the head of the branch in 1938. After the outbreak of World War II, Keith was appointed to the Office of Enemy Property and worked with the German bureaucracy to prevent the subsidiary's nationalization.

Coca-Cola GmbH was unable to obtain Coca-Cola syrup during the war due to the Allied blockade. The supply of regular Coca-Cola ran out in 1942, having been reserved primarily for wounded soldiers in hospitals. To keep the company's plants in operation, Keith developed a fruit-flavored drink made from available ingredients, including apple fiber from cider pressings, whey (a byproduct of cheesemaking), and beet sugar, creating Fanta. The drink sold 3 million cases in 1943, sustaining the firm's business in Germany.

== Legacy ==
A street in Essen, the site of Coca-Cola GmbH's former headquarters, is named after him.
