= Sprite Zero Sugar =

Brand of soft drink

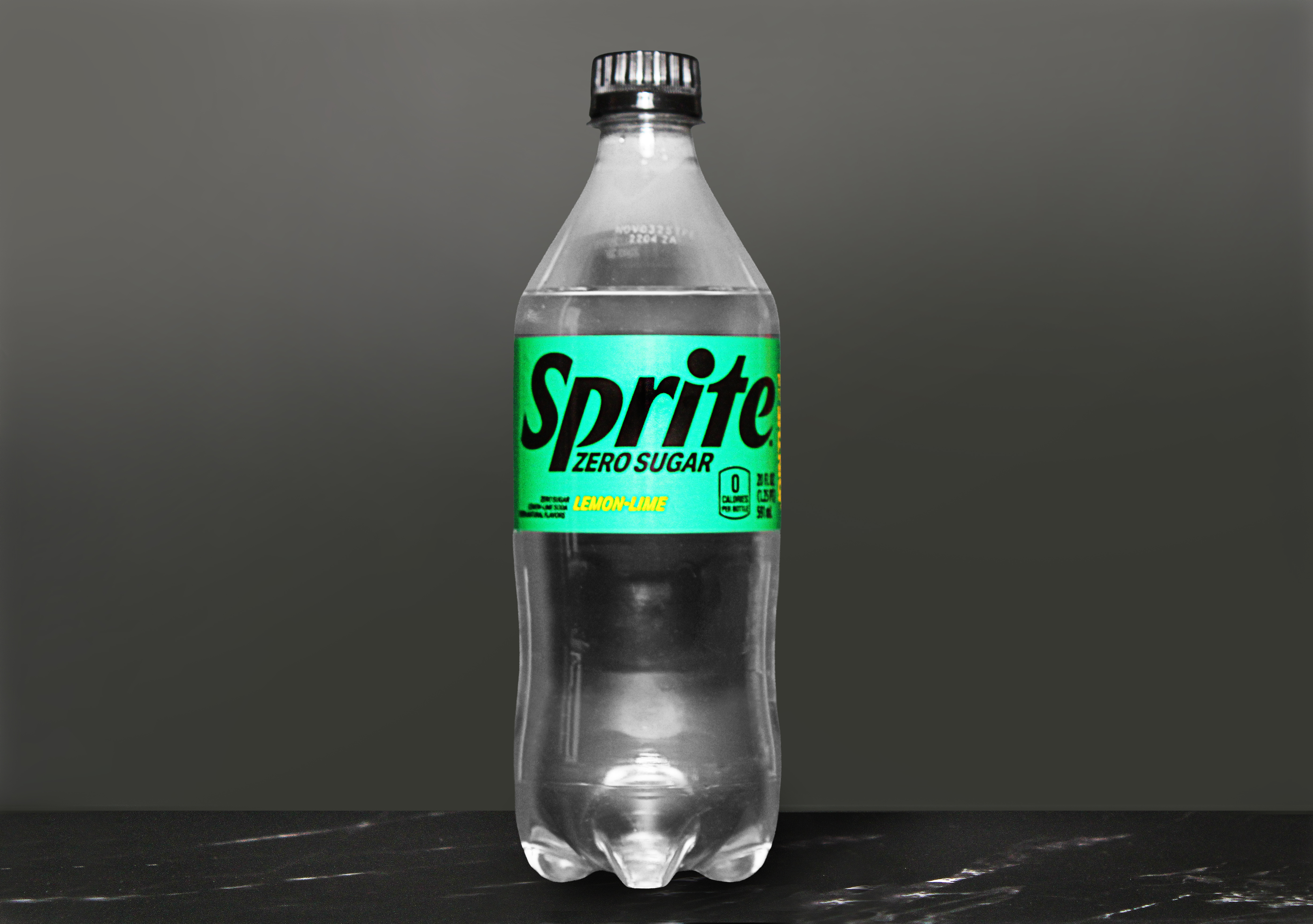
- A 20oz (591mL) plastic bottle of Sprite Zero Sugar
- Type: Sugar-Free Lemon-lime
- Manufacturer: The Coca-Cola Company
- Origin: United States
- Color: Transparent
- Related products: 7up, Sprite

Sprite Zero Sugar (also known as Diet Sprite or Sprite No Sugar, and known as simply Sprite in the Netherlands and Ireland) is a colorless, lemon-lime soft drink produced by The Coca-Cola Company. It is a sugar-free variant of Sprite, and is one of the drinks in Coca-Cola's "Zero Sugar" lineup.

== History ==
Sprite Zero Sugar originally began production as "Sugar Free Sprite" in 1974, and was renamed to "Diet Sprite" in 1983. In other countries, it was known as "Sprite Light". The brand "Sprite Zero" was first used in Greece in 2002. Beginning in 2002, the name was changed almost worldwide to Sprite Zero, matching The Coca-Cola Company's launch of Fanta Zero and Coca-Cola Zero. In 2019, the drink was re-branded as "Sprite Zero Sugar" in order to align with the Coca-Cola Company's 2017 re-brand of Coca-Cola Zero as "Coca-Cola Zero Sugar" and its 2019 extension of that branding to its zero-calorie varieties of Coca-Cola Vanilla and Coca-Cola Cherry.

== Ingredients ==
The following ingredients are listed here: carbonated water, citric acid, natural flavors, potassium citrate, and potassium benzoate, aspartame, and acesulfame potassium. (Aspartame contains phenylalanine.)

== Varieties ==
Name	Launched	Notes
Sprite Cranberry Zero	2013	Sprite Zero flavored with spices and cranberry. It was first sold for the holiday season in 2013 alongside its regular counterpart and has been sold every holiday season until 2019, when Winter Spiced Cranberry Zero replaced it. It was also sold in Belgium and the Netherlands.
Sprite Cherry Zero	2017	Sprite Zero with a cherry flavor. Launched in 2017 in the United States as a permanent variety along its regular counterpart.
Sprite Extra; Sprite Fiber+ Sprite Plus	2017 (Japan); 2018 (China); 2019 (Hong Kong and Macau); 2020 (Taiwan)	Zero-sugar, zero-calorie Sprite with dietary fiber added. 7.5 grams of dietary fiber are included (approximately 30% of the daily fiber requirement for adults). According to the bottle, this is the amount of fiber found in two apples. It debuted in 2017, in Japan, then April 2018 in Chongqing, China, 2019 in Hong Kong, and finally, 2020 in Taiwan.
Sprite Cucumber Zero Sugar	2018	Sprite Zero with a Cucumber flavor. It was introduced to the UK and Ireland in 2018, but was discontinued a year later. It was also sold in the Netherlands as simply Sprite Cucumber.
Sprite Zero Lemon & Mint	2018	A low-calorie version of Sprite Ice that is available in Greece, Serbia, Hungary, Germany. It has also been sold in the Netherlands, Belgium, Spain, Argentina, Brazil under different names, and as Sprite Chill Zero Sugar Mint in South Korea, Germany and the United Kingdom.
Sprite Winter Spiced Cranberry Zero Sugar	2019	A replacement for the original Sprite Cranberry Zero. It is sold around the holiday season alongside the regular version.
Sprite Lemon-Lime + Cactus	2020	A variant with added Cactus fruit flavoring. It was sold exclusively in Belgium and the Netherlands, and is the first Zero Sugar-exclusive variant sold in the world.
Sprite Ginger Zero	2020	Sprite Zero with an added note of ginger to complement the classic lemon–lime flavor. Sold in the United States alongside the regular variety.
Sprite Lemon+ Zero Sugar	2022	No calorie version of Sprite Lemon+. Sold in Australia.
Sprite + Tea Zero Sugar	2025	Sprite Zero mixed with the taste of sweet tea. It was introduced as a limited edition in the United States and Canada in May 2025 alongside the regular counterpart, and was sold until October. It will be re-released once again for a limited time in 2026.
Sprite Chill Zero Sugar Mango Citrus	2026	A mango/citrus flavored variant with cooling agents made to give the drink a "freezing" feel. It was released in the United States as a Walmart-exclusive in March 2026, and is the first Zero Sugar variant in the Sprite Chill lineup.

== Nutrition ==
Comparing Sprite Zero Sugar to other popular lemon-lime sodas:

Soft drink	Calories	Fat	Sodium	Carbohydrates	Sugars	Aspartame	Acesulfame-Potassium
Sprite	140	0g	38 mg	38g	38g	0 mg	0 mg
Sprite Zero Sugar	0	0g	35 mg	0g	0g	75 mg/355mL	50 mg/355mL
7up	140	0g	40 mg	39g	38g	0 mg	0 mg
Diet 7up	0	0g	65 mg	0g	0g	124 mg / 355mL	32 mg / 355mL
Sierra Mist	140	0g	35 mg	37g	37g	0 mg	0 mg
Diet Sierra Mist	0	0g	35 mg	0g	0g	102 mg / 355mL	32 mg / 355mL
