= Sprite Remix =

Line of soft drinks

- Type: Flavored soft drink
- Manufacturer: The Coca-Cola Company
- Distributor: The Coca-Cola Company
- Origin: United States
- Introduced: 2002; 2015 (reintroduced)
- Discontinued: 2006
- Color: Clear
- Flavor: Tropical; BerryClear; Aruba Jam
- Variants: Tropical REMiX, BerryClear REMiX, Aruba Jam REMiX
- Related products: Sprite

Sprite Remix was a line of "remixed" colorless caffeine-free sodas and drink-flavoring packets made by The Coca-Cola Company. Although based on Sprite, this lineup of 3 flavors each had a different flavor from the original. It was discontinued in early 2006 in the United States. In the spring of 2015, the Tropical Sprite Remix flavor was reintroduced under the name Sprite Tropical and renamed Sprite Tropical Mix a year later.

== Flavors ==
There were three flavors introduced in different years.

- Sprite Tropical Remix: Sprite with tropical fruit flavors, introduced in 2003. It was reintroduced as Sprite Tropical in Spring 2015, and was reintroduced again as Sprite Tropical Mix in Spring 2016.
- Sprite BerryClear Remix: Sprite with berry flavors, introduced in April 2004.
- Sprite Aruba Jam Remix: Sprite with fruit flavors, introduced in April 2005, short-lived. Reintroduced in 2024 as a Coca-Cola Freestyle exclusive flavor at participating Wendy's locations.

== 'Remix Flavor Hits' packets ==
Three packets of Sprite Remix 'Flavor Hits'.

Coca-Cola also had a do-it-yourself promotion, where it offered free 1.25 ounce (36.9 ml.) flavor packets, which consumers use to pour them into their Sprite. There were three flavors, which are grape, vanilla, and cherry.

== Sprite Tropical Mix ==
Sprite Tropical Remix was re-released as Sprite Tropical in the spring of 2015. Sources on Twitter, Facebook, and Instagram have shown it popping up in the eastern United States, with eBay listings also appearing.

After a limited-roll out in spring 2015 and no public mention from Coca-Cola, the official Sprite website was updated showing another re-release for Sprite Tropical Remix, which was renamed to Sprite Tropical Mix on February 29, 2016. The new bottle label shows that the tropical flavors are lemon/lime, strawberry, and pineapple.

In 2018, Sprite introduced a similar drink, 'MIX by Sprite Tropic Berry, exclusive to McDonald's restaurants. Along with the base lemon-lime flavor, Tropic Berry includes a blend of strawberry, orange, and pineapple flavor.

In 2019, The Coca-Cola Company updated the Sprite logo and thus redesigned their packaging, replacing the drink's former retro branding with the same simplistic branding used in other flavors in the Sprite lineup.

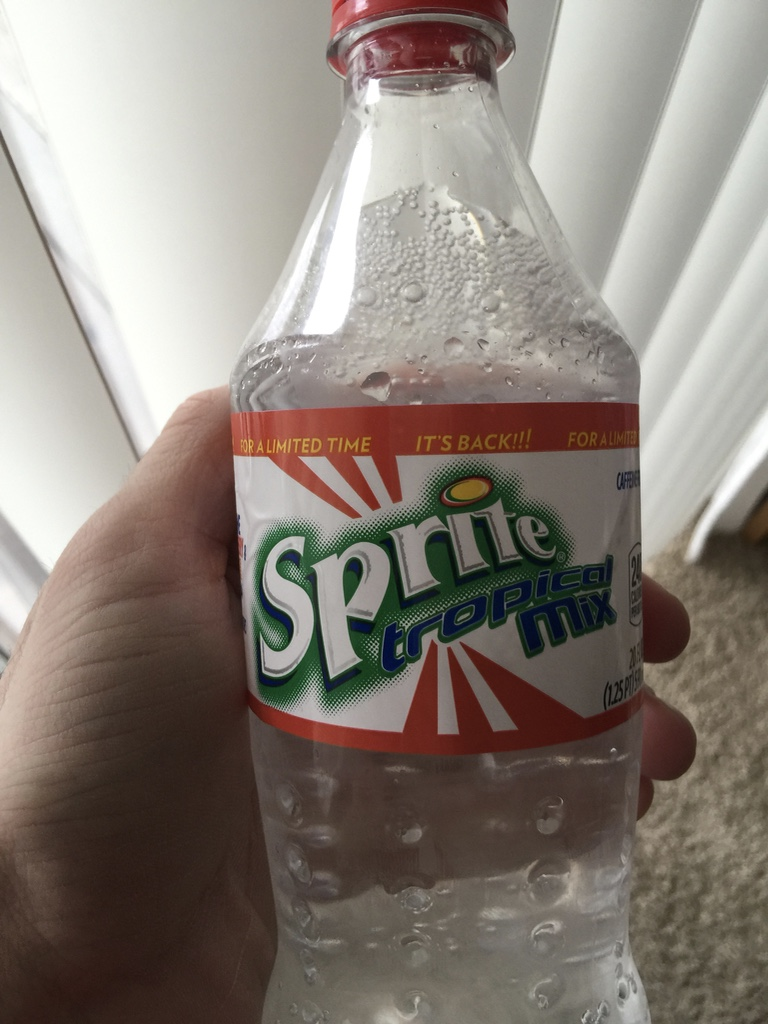
A Sprite Tropical Mix bottle
