= Rondo (soft drink) =

Citrus-flavored soft drink

Rondo was a citrus-flavored soft drink available in limited U.S. markets in the late 1970s and early 1980s, one which was "blended from fine essences", and "lightly carbonated". It is mostly famous for its slogan - "Rondo---The Thirst Crusher" - as well as its commercials, featuring people crushing the cans in various ways. The cans featured bright yellow packaging for regular Rondo and green packaging for Diet Rondo. It was introduced in 1978 by Cadbury-Schweppes.

Schweppes sells a similar drink in Australia under the name Solo.

The drink and its name were parodied in the 2006 film Idiocracy as "Brawndo: The Thirst Mutilator".

In 2023 Rondo returned for sale in the U.S. market. The can design retains much of the original colors and look and feel with some slight changes.

== Slogans ==
- "Rondo - The Thirst Crusher!"
- "Lightly carbonated, so you can slam it down fast!"

== See also ==
- List of defunct consumer brands
