= Hi-C =

Fruit juice-flavored soft drink

- Type: Fruit drink
- Manufacturer: Minute Maid
- Origin: United States
- Introduced: 1947
- Color: Colorless (juice boxes); Colored (fountain)
- Variants: See variations below
- Website: www.hi-c.com

Hi-C is an American fruit juice–flavored drink made by the Minute Maid division of the Coca-Cola Company. It was created by Niles Foster in 1946 and released in 1947. The sole original flavor was orange, with additional flavors introduced in subsequent years.

== History ==
A 1958 sales team promotional newsletter excerpt

Niles Foster, a former bakery and bottling plant owner, created Hi-C in 1946. It took Foster over a year to develop the ideal formula for Hi-C orange drink; the formula contains orange juice concentrate, peel oil and orange essences, sugar, water, citric acid and ascorbic acid (vitamin C). The name "Hi-C" referred to its high vitamin content. Hot-packed in enamel-lined 56-ounce (1.66 L) cans, the product needed no refrigeration before opening. After test marketing in 1947, Hi-C orange drink was introduced in 1948 with a massive promotional effort, spending thousands of dollars weekly per market on promotions. Foster entered into an agreement with Clinton Foods, Inc., to produce and market Hi-C, with Foster managing the Hi-C business.

Originally marketed in the Southern United States, Hi-C was introduced into the Los Angeles and San Francisco markets in 1949. As markets for Hi-C were expanded nationwide, so were the contract operations, strategically located near major market areas. The multi-plant system facilitated quick product shipping, minimizing out-of-date merchandise problems. New flavors of Hi-C fruit drinks were developed as an outgrowth of the contract packer system. Grape, the second flavor introduced, evolved naturally from the fact that the Geneva, Ohio, co-packer was also processing fresh grapes. Apple and cherry drinks were introduced as a result of the fresh fruit processing operations at the Paw Paw, Michigan, co-packer plant.

As the Hi-C business continued to grow, it attracted the attention of the Minute Maid Corporation. In 1954, Clinton Foods, Inc. sold its Florida holdings—including Hi-C fruit drinks—to Minute Maid. Niles Foster left the Minute Maid Corporation shortly after the Hi-C brand was purchased. George Roberts, assistant sales manager for Niles Foster when Hi-C was introduced, remained with the company, initially as National Sales Manager for Hi-C, then later as Director of Contract Packer Operations for the Houston, Texas, based Coca-Cola Foods Division, ensuring the successful marketing, promotion, and distribution of Hi-C. The Hi-C business continued to expand with new flavors (orange-pineapple, pineapple-grapefruit, Florida Punch, peach) and innovative marketing techniques. By 1958, Hi-C fruit drinks had become an American supermarket staple, available in every grocery store nationwide.

== Product lines ==
=== Drink boxes ===
- Flashin' Fruit Punch (Blend of orange and pineapple juices)
- Orange Lavaburst (Blend of orange and pear juices)
- Torrential Tropical Punch (Blend of orange and pineapple juices)
- Boppin' Strawberry (Blend of pear and strawberry juices)
- Grabbin' Grape (Blend of pear and grape juices)
- Strawberry Kiwi Kraze (Blend of pear, apple, strawberry and kiwi juices)
- Poppin' Lemonade (discontinued)
- Blazin' Blueberry (Blend of apple, grape and blueberry juices) (discontinued)
- Wild Cherry (Blend of pear and cherry juices) (discontinued)
- Smashin' Wild Berry (Blend of apple, pear, blackberry, blueberry and raspberry juices) (discontinued)
- Ecto Cooler (discontinued)
- Candy Apple Cooler (discontinued)
- Double Fruit Cooler (discontinued)
- Hula Punch (discontinued)

=== Drink mixes ===
- Flashin' Fruit Punch
- Grabbin' Grape
- Mashin' Mango Melon
- Blazin' Blueberry (discontinued)

=== Coca-Cola Freestyle ===
- Cherry
- Fruit Punch
- Grape
- Lemon
- Orange
- Orange Vanilla
- Raspberry (discontinued)
- Raspberry Lime (discontinued)
- Strawberry
- Blueberry

=== Fountain ===
- Flashin' Fruit Punch
- Orange Lavaburst
- Poppin' Pink Lemonade

=== Hi-C Blast (discontinued) ===
- Berry Blue
- Blue Watermelon
- Fruit Pow
- Fruit Punch
- Orange Supernova
- Raspberry Kiwi
- Strawberry
- Strawberry Kiwi
- Wild Berry
- Wild Cherry

=== Ecto Cooler ===
Ecto Cooler was a product tie-in with the cartoon series The Real Ghostbusters, based on the 1984 live-action film, Ghostbusters. Slimer left the box sometime around 1997. In 2001, Minute Maid discontinued the product, renaming it Shoutin' Orange Tangergreen. Slimer was replaced on the packaging by a similar-looking blob of lips. The product was still noted as ecto cooler on many store receipts. In 2006, Shoutin' Orange Tangergreen was renamed Crazy Citrus Cooler. In 2007, Crazy Citrus Cooler was discontinued.

In April 2016, Coca-Cola announced that Ecto Cooler will return for a limited time, starting May 30, as part of a promotion with the rebooted Ghostbusters. A company spokeswoman said the new drink will have its original sweeteners simplified to just high fructose corn syrup, and other ingredients reduced so it "maintains the correct amount of tartness."

In October 2016, the Ecto Cooler Facebook page announced that the drink would be again discontinued at the end of the year with a post saying "My eyes are welling up with green tears as I write this: #EctoCooler will be laid to rest at the end of this year #RIPEcto." Fans were urged to stockpile the drink while it was still available; however, response to this news from fans was overwhelmingly negative considering the drink was never mass-produced or easy to find in stores during its May to December run.

With the November 2021 release of Ghostbusters: Afterlife, a direct sequel to the original franchise, Ecto Cooler received an even more limited reissue. The 2021 reissue was not available for retail purchase at all; the only way to acquire the beverage was to win it by responding to official Hi-C and Ghostbusters-related social media posts.

== McDonald's ==
In April 2017, McDonald's restaurants announced they were discontinuing Hi-C Orange Lavaburst from their beverage menu and replacing it with Fanta and Sprite TropicBerry sodas as part of a new promotional deal with Coca-Cola. In February 2021, McDonald's announced that Hi-C Orange Lavaburst would return to their menu by summer 2021.

== In popular culture ==
The Hi-C Ecto Cooler drink appears in the 2019 Rick and Morty episode Claw and Hoarder: Special Ricktim's Morty, and the 2021 Loki episode Journey into Mystery.
