= Hit (drink) =

Venezuelan soft drink

- Type: Soft drink
- Manufacturer: Coca-Cola FEMSA Venezuela
- Origin: Venezuela
- Introduced: 1956; 69 years ago
- Discontinued: 2025; 0 years ago
- Related products: Fanta, Mirinda

Hit was a carbonated fruit-flavored soft drink brand owned by The Coca-Cola Company that was available in Venezuela, and was sold as the Venezuelan counterpart to Coca-Cola's existing Fanta brand.

== History ==
Hit was first introduced in 1956 by Grupo Cisneros' beverage division, who at the time was known as the bottler of Pepsi products in the country. The venture was later renamed as Hit de Venezuela.

In August 1996, Coca-Cola announced a new joint-venture with Grupo Cisneros called Emboutelladoras Coca-Cola y Hit de Venezuela, completely pulling Pepsi out of the Venezuelan market. During the formation of the new joint-venture, Coca-Cola purchased the Hit, Chinotto and Frescolita brands from Grupo.

On May 13, 1997, it was announced that Panamerican Beverages Inc., Coca-Cola's Latin-American distributor, had fully purchased the Emboutelladoras Coca-Cola y Hit de Venezuela joint-venture outright for $1.01 billion. Coca-Cola later discontinued Fanta in the country and rebranded Hit into the Venezuelan counterpart to Fanta.

In 2025, Coca-Cola FEMSA discontinued Hit in the country and announced that Fanta would return to the Venezuelan market.

== Products ==
=== Current ===
- Hit Apple (Manzanita in Spanish, literally "Little Apple")
- Hit Grape (Uva in Spanish)
- Hit Orange (Naranja in Spanish)
- Hit Kolita (mix of tutti-frutti, vanillin and chewing gum)
- Hit Pineapple (Piña in Spanish)

=== Discontinued ===
- Hit Passion Fruit (Parchita in Spanish)
- Hit Tangerine (Mandarina in Spanish)
- Hit Guarana (renamed as Senzao)
- Hit Grapefruit (Toronja in Spanish, renamed Quatro)
