= Royal Tru =

Philippine soft drink

- Type: Soft drink
- Manufacturer: Coca-Cola Beverages Philippines, Inc.
- Origin: Philippines
- Introduced: 1922; 104 years ago
- Variants: Royal Tru-Orange; Royal Tru-Grape; Royal Tru-Lemon; Royal Tru-Strawberry
- Related products: Fanta, Mirinda, Sunkist, Crush

Royal Tru (often referred to simply as Royal) is a carbonated fruit-flavored soft drink brand owned by The Coca-Cola Company that is exclusive to the Philippines. The brand was introduced in 1922 by the original San Miguel Brewery. After being acquired by Coca-Cola's Philippine unit in 2007, the brand has become the Philippine counterpart of Coca-Cola's Fanta brand.

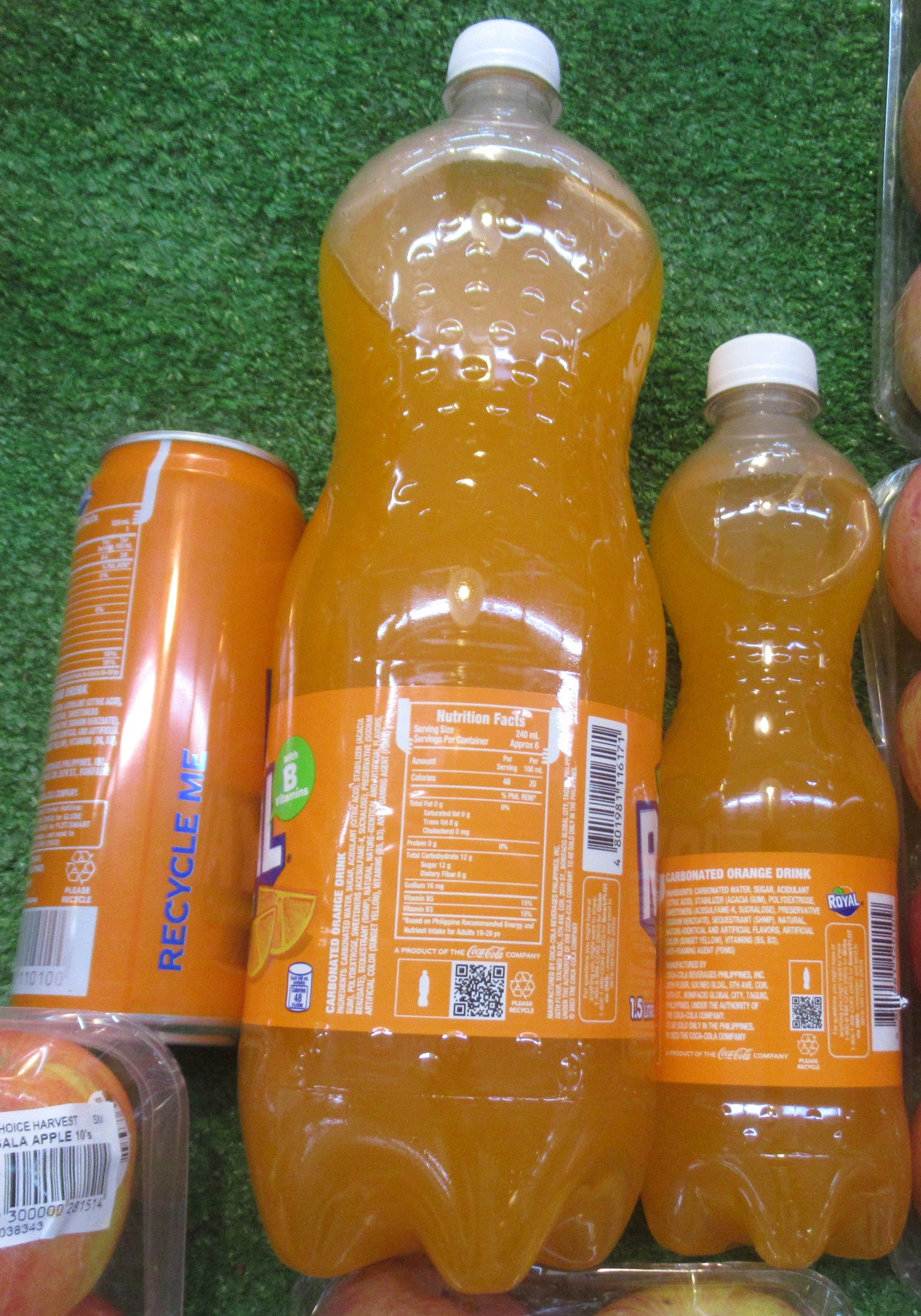
Sample Royal Tru-Orange products

Alternative logo still seen on product labels

== History ==
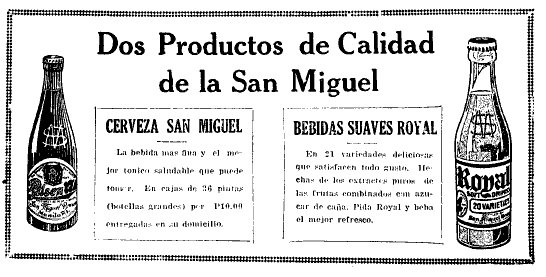
A Spanish-language poster advertising beverages produced by the original San Miguel Brewery, including Royal fruit-flavored soft drinks (right), circa 1924.

The Royal brand was first introduced in 1922 by the original San Miguel Brewery as its first non-alcoholic, carbonated beverage. In 1927, San Miguel became the first international bottler of Coca-Cola. The Royal brand became best associated with its orange-flavored soft drink, Royal Tru-Orange.

In 1981, San Miguel spun off its soft drink business (its Coca-Cola franchise and the manufacture of Royal beverages) to a new company known as Coca-Cola Bottlers Philippines, Inc. (CCBPI), a joint-venture with The Coca-Cola Company. The brand continued to be owned by San Miguel until 2007 when it sold the rights to the brand along with its entire interest in CCBPI to The Coca-Cola Company.

CCBPI was renamed Coca-Cola FEMSA Philippines, Inc. in January 2013 with the entry of Mexico-based Coca-Cola FEMSA S.A. de C.V. Coca-Cola FEMSA Philippines was renamed Coca-Cola Beverages Philippines, Inc. (CCBPI) in December 2018 after the acquisition of 50% interest in the company by Bottling Investments Group (BIG).

== Products ==
=== Current ===
- Royal Tru-Orange
- Royal Tru-Grape
- Royal Tru-Lemon
- Royal Tru-Strawberry
- Royal Tru-Lychee
- Royal Tru-Orange Zero Sugar (formerly Royal Tru-Orange Light)

=== Discontinued ===
- Royal Lem-O-Lime
- Royal Sparkling Soda
- Royal Tonic Water
- Royal Ginger Ale
- Royal Root Beer
- Royal Tru-Dalandan
- Royal Wattamelon

== Marketing ==
A Filipino language advertisement of Royal Tru-Orange, dated in 1976.

The beverage targets teenagers as its consumers. The product was available during the 1970s in single-serve bottles and contained orange "pulp bits" (pulp) "from California Valencia oranges".

When San Miguel Corporation became one of the founding members of the Philippine Basketball Association in 1975, its basketball franchise played under the name "Royal Tru-Orange" from 1975 to 1980.

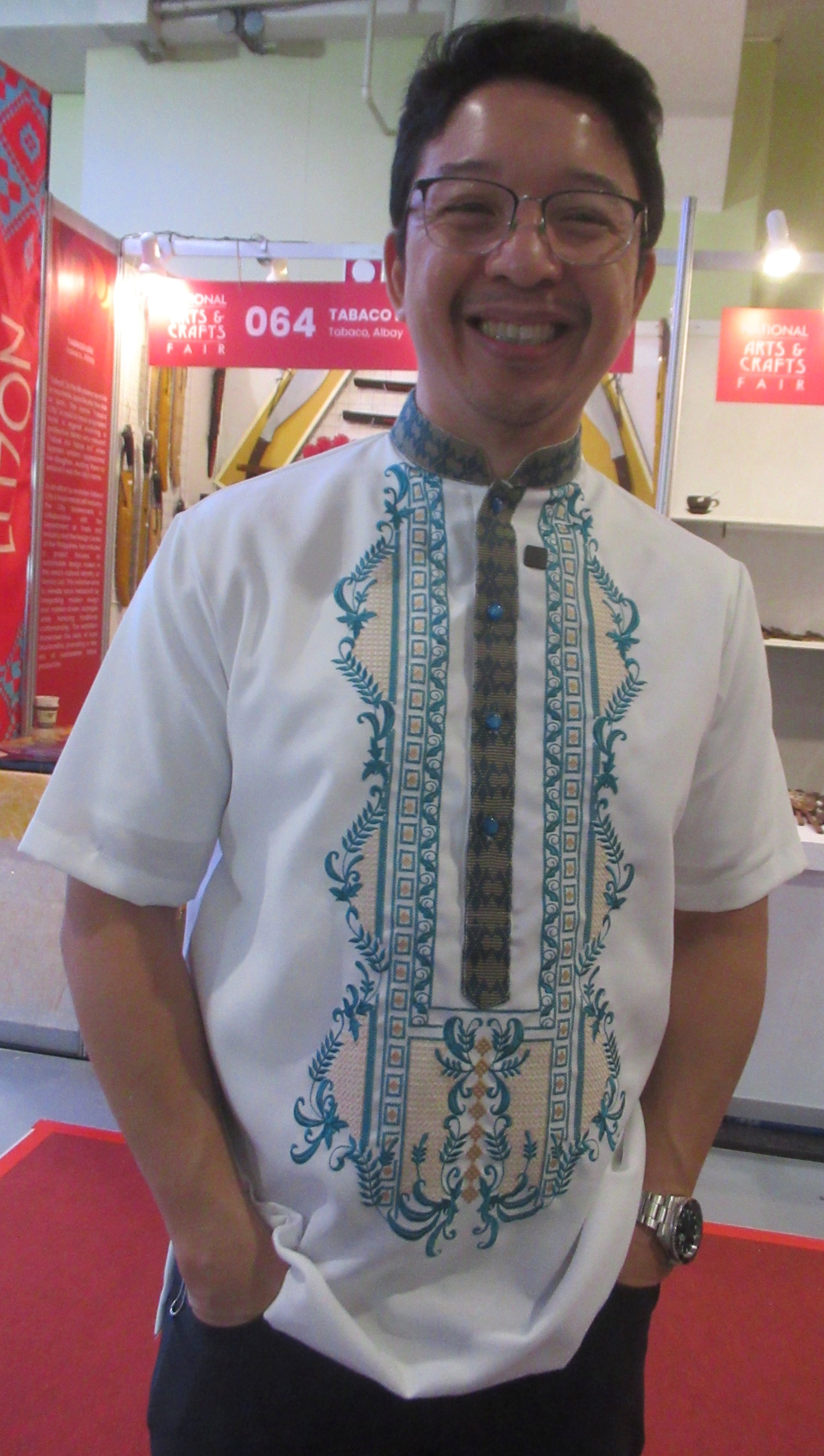
RJ Ledesma (pictured), who played the character of Joey in a successful ad campaign for Royal Tru.

Royal Tru-Orange gained much attention in the mid-1980s following the restoration of democracy in the Philippines, after its logo and formulation (now without the orange pulp) were changed, and to promote it, an advertising campaign was launched that starred teen model RJ Ledesma playing the role of a character named Joey. The first television advertisement in the series, wherein Joey was being egged on by friends to introduce himself to a girl named Jenny, was directed by noted film director the late Lino Brocka.

In 1992, Royal Tru-Orange released its slogan "Ito Ang Gusto Ko!" (transl. This Is What I Want!), derived from the title of a song of the late Francis Magalona. Magalona himself would appear on the brand's ads, rapping a modified version of his own song as a jingle. An edited version of the 1992 advertisement was reaired in 2009 following Magalona's death. The slogan would later be used again in 2024, but with a new and original jingle sung by model, singer and actress Maymay Entrata. The jingle is based on a 2024 worldwide campaign for Fanta where it revived a previous 2003 campaign featuring the lyrics "wanna Fanta, don't you wanna?".

=== Slogans ===
- "Pag-ibig kong Tunay!" ("My true love!") (1973–1982)
- "Royal, natural!" ("Royal, naturally!") (1982–1987)
- "Ako at Royal, natural!" ("Royal and I, naturally!") (1987–1992)
- "Ito ang gusto ko!" ("This is what I want!") (1992–1998, 2024–present)
- "Yan ang tru!" ("That is tru!") (2003–2007)
- "Ilabas ang kulit!" ("Bring out the crazy!") (2009–2019)
- "Generation Kulit" ("Crazy Generation") (2021–2024)

== Controversies ==
Royal Tru-Orange was one of 300 products of the Philippines barred by the U.S. Food and Drug Administration in 2004 from entering the United States due to "failure to meet its requirements".
