= Sprite (drink) =

Lemon-lime soft drink

- Logo used since 2026

- A cup and can of Sprite
- Type: Lemon-lime
- Manufacturer: The Coca-Cola Company
- Origin: Germany (drink); United States (branding)
- Introduced: 1959; 67 years ago
- Colour: Colourless
- Variants: See variations below
- Related products: 7 Up, Starry, Mitsuya Cider
- Website: www.sprite.com

Sprite is a clear, lemon-lime flavored soft drink created by the Coca-Cola Company. Sprite comes in additional flavors, including cranberry, cherry, grape, orange, tropical, ginger, pineapple, and vanilla. Ice, peach, Berryclear remix, Citrus and mint, and newer versions of the drinks are artificially sweetened. Sprite was created primarily to compete against Keurig Dr Pepper's 7 Up.

== History ==
The Sprite brand name was created in about 1955 for a line of drinks with flavors such as strawberry and orange, by T. C. "Bud" Evans, a Houston-based bottler who also distributed Coca-Cola products. The rights to the name were acquired by the Coca-Cola Company in 1960.

The lemon-lime drink known today as Sprite was developed in West Germany in 1959 as Fanta Klare Zitrone ("Fanta Clear Lemon" in English) and was introduced in the United States under the Sprite name in 1961 as a competitor to 7 Up.

== Marketing ==
Former logo

Former logo, used from 2022 to 2026.

Sprite advertisements often make use of the portmanteau word "lymon", a combination of the words lemon and lime. Additionally, the bottle of the beverage has several concave spots, an attempt to emulate the bubbles caused by the soda's carbonation.

By the 1980s, Sprite had developed a large following among teenagers. In response, Sprite began to cater to this demographic in its advertisements in 1987. "I Like the Sprite In You" was the brand's first long-running slogan, and many jingles were produced around it before its discontinuation in 1994.

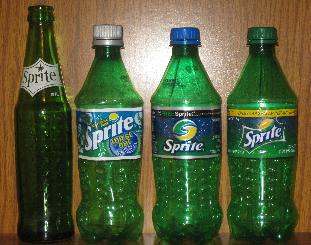
The evolution of Sprite bottles

In 1993, marketing agency Lowe and Partners created a new slogan, "Control your thirst" with commission from the Coca-Cola Company. The new, more vibrant logo stood out more on packaging and featured a blue-to-green gradient with silver "splashes" and subtle white "bubbles" in the background. The product name, "Sprite" had a logo with a blue backdrop shadow. The words; "Great Lymon Taste!" which had been present on the previous logo, were removed. This logo was used in the United States until 2006, and similar variants were used in other countries until this year as well.

The brand's slogan was changed to "Obey Your Thirst", and jingles containing it featured a hip-hop theme. One of the first lyrics for the new slogan was, "never forget yourself 'cause first things first, grab a cold, cold can, and obey your thirst." Under the new slogan, Sprite tapped into hip-hop culture by leveraging up and coming, as well as underground rap artists including; LL Cool J, A Tribe Called Quest, KRS-One, Missy Elliott, Grand Puba, Common, Fat Joe, Nas and others in television commercials. Sprite expanded its urban connections in the late 1990s by featuring both amateur and accomplished basketball players in their advertisements.

In the 1990s, one of Sprite's longest-running ad campaigns was "Grant Hill Drinks Sprite" (overlapping its "Obey Your Thirst" campaign), in which the well-liked basketball player's abilities, and Sprite's importance in giving him his abilities, were humorously exaggerated.

In 2000, Sprite commissioned graffiti artist Temper to design limited edition art, which appeared on 100 million cans across Europe.

In 2004, Coke created Miles Thirst, a vinyl doll voiced by Reno Wilson, used in advertising to exploit the hip-hop market for soft drinks.

In 2006, a new Sprite logo, consisting of two yellow and green "halves" forming an "S" lemon/lime design, made its debut on Sprite bottles and cans. The slogan was changed from its long-running "Obey Your Thirst" to just "Obey" in the United States and was outright replaced with "Freedom From Thirst" in many countries. This was the decade's first major shift in advertising themes. The "Sublymonal" campaign was also used as part of the alternate reality game the Lost Experience. This also resurrected the "lymon" word.

Sprite redesigned its label in 2009, removing the "S" logo.

In the mid-2010s, famous NBA players and hip-hop artists such as LeBron James, Trae Young, Vince Staples, and Lil Yachty appeared in Sprite ads.

In July 2022, the Coca-Cola Company announced that Sprite would discontinue its green bottles on August 1 and switch to clear plastic bottles. The green plastic contains green polyethylene terephthalate (PET), an additive that cannot be recycled into new bottles.

In 2022, Australia released lemon flavoured variants Sprite Lemon+ and Sprite Lemon+ Zero Sugar.

In 2024, Sprite-mint was made available in some select Asian markets. In 2026 the Coca-Cola company started a new campaign called "It's That Fresh" where they brought back the "Lymon" as a nostalgia push in hopes to boost sales.

=== Formula changes ===
In France in 2012, the drink was reformulated removing 30% of the sugar and replacing it with the sweetener stevia, leading to the drink containing fewer calories. This soon spread to Ireland, the UK, the Netherlands and Poland in 2013.

A further formula change happened in the UK in 2018. This formula change, done to coincide with the sugary drinks tax in the country, reduces the sugar amount and replaces stevia with aspartame and acesulfame K. This formula was later extended to other regions across the world to coincide with similar sugar tax rules.

In the Netherlands in March 2017, Coca-Cola announced that Sprite would be relaunched exclusively as a sugar-free drink, with the standard variety being discontinued and Sprite Zero being renamed as simply Sprite. This change was expanded to Ireland in 2018.

In Australia, Sprite was relaunched with a new recipe containing 40% less sugar (compared with old Sprite) in August 2019. Unlike most of the reformulations this version does not use aspartame, instead using sucralose in addition to acesulfame K.

In March 2023, Coca-Cola announced another further formula change for Sprite and Sprite Zero Sugar in the United Kingdom, produced to differentiate the two varieties. The new formula has slightly increased sugar content but still contains aspartame and acesulfame K. Some territories including France, Poland and Germany use a similar lower-sugar formula but do not utilize any artificial sweeteners.

Wanna Sprite Cranberry?

In mid-November 2017, Sprite released an ad for the Sprite Cranberry variation, featuring LeBron James and rapper DRAM. The ad is animated in a style reminiscent of Rankin-Bass holiday specials such as Rudolph the Red-Nosed Reindeer, and features a rambunctious family gathering during the holidays as LeBron enters saying "Wanna Sprite Cranberry?".

The commercial gained popularity on various sites for its meme potential, in particular the "Wanna Sprite Cranberry" line delivery and LeBron as he is portrayed in the ad were commonly associated with meme culture around the holidays as the commercial aired and re-aired yearly. The commercial was even edited by The Coca-Cola Company to feature Winter Spice Cranberry, the replacement for Sprite Cranberry, once Sprite Cranberry was phased out.

== Variations ==
Name	Launched	Notes
Sprite	1959	The original variety.
Sprite Zero Sugar	1974	Sprite without the sugar. It was originally produced in the United States as "Sugar Free Sprite" in 1974, then was renamed to "Diet Sprite" in 1983, with some countries having the drink known as "Sprite Light" ("Sprite Lite" in the United Kingdom). In September 2004, it was rebranded as "Diet Sprite Zero" in the US and "Sprite Zero" ("Sprite Z" in the United Kingdom, until rebranding as Sprite Zero) in Argentina, Australia, Bolivia, Brazil, China, Colombia, Europe, India, Pakistan, Paraguay, Peru, Uruguay, New Zealand, and the UK. "Diet" was dropped from the product's name, to become simply "Sprite Zero," when new logos debuted in June 2006. The "Zero" designation for low-calorie sodas from the Coca-Cola Company was first used on Diet Sprite Zero before being used on the flagship Zero product, Coca-Cola Zero. Re-branded as "Sprite Zero Sugar" in 2019 to align with the Coca-Cola Company's 2017 re-branding of Coca-Cola Zero as Coca-Cola Zero Sugar.
Sprite Lemon-Lime Herb	1970s	Sprite with a herb taste. Only known to be sold in Germany.
Chinotto	1990s (purchase by Coca-Cola)	The name Sprite is known as in Venezuela. It was originally an independently produced beverage alongside Hit before Coca-Cola purchased the bottler and later rebranded the graphics of both as Venezuelan counterparts to their existing drinks, with Chinotto becoming the counterpart to Sprite.
Recharge by Sprite	Early 2000s	A Sprite Energy Drink variant sold in Australia until 2006. The drink was also turquoise in color, whereas Sprite is usually clear.
Sprite Ice	2002	Sprite with a minty aftertaste. Originally released as "Sprite Blue" in Korea in 2002, and has been released under various names, such as "Sprite Ice" in various countries like Canada, '"Sprite Ice Cube" and later "Sprite Mint Touch" in Belgium, "Sprite Ice Blue" in Italy and Chile, "Sprite Icy Mint" in mainland China, "Sprite Mynta" in Sweden, "Sprite Mynte" in Norway, and "Sprite Menthe" in select French-speaking territories.
Sprite Remix Tropical	2003	Sprite with Tropical Flavors, and the first in the Sprite Remix series of sodas sold in the United States. It was sold from 2003 to 2004, until being replaced with the "Berryclear" variety.
Sprite Super Lemon	2003	A Slurpee Variant of Sprite, released in Hong Kong in 2003.
Sprite on Fire	2004	Sprite with a ginger flavor, which was marketed as having a burning sensation. It was introduced in Hong Kong in 2003, and later debuted in China in 2004.
Sprite Remix BerryClear	2004	Sprite with Berry flavors, and the second in the Sprite Remix series of sodas sold in the United States. It was sold from 2004 to 2005, until being replaced with the "Aruba Jam" variety.
Sprite Remix Aruba Jam	2005	Sprite with Fruit Flavors, and the last in the Sprite Remix series of sodas sold in the United States. It was sold from 2005 to 2006.
Sprite 3G	2005	A Sprite energy drink variant originally launched in the United Kingdom in 2005. Ingredients include glucose, caffeine from green coffee beans, and guarana. It was also released in various other countries but was discontinued in the UK in 2007 due to poor sales as Coca-Cola sought to focus more on Relentless.
Sprite Duo	2007	A variant with less carbonation and extra lemon juice. Was released exclusively in Spain in Spring 2007.
Sprite Green	2009	A variant sweetened with Truvia (a natural zero-calorie sweetener made from stevia). It was not successful and was discontinued not long after being released.
Sprite (Stevia Formula)	2012	In France in 2012, Sprite was reformulated removing 30% of the sugar and replacing it with the sweetener stevia. This led to the drink containing fewer calories. This reformulation soon spread to Ireland, the United Kingdom, and the Netherlands in 2013. It was discontinued in the Netherlands in 2017 when the Coca-Cola Company rebranded Sprite Zero as simply Sprite. This was followed on in the United Kingdom and Poland in 2018 when the formula was changed and aspartame and Ace K were added as replacements (although Poland reverted to solely using sugar in 2020), while France reverted to the original sugar-sweetened formula in 2020.
Sprite Select	2012	A mid-calorie version of Sprite sweetened with a blend of sugar, Stevia and Erythritol. It was test-marketed in select areas of the United States in the summer of 2012 alongside Fanta Select.
Sprite Cranberry	2013	Sprite flavored with spices and cranberry. It was first sold for the holiday season in 2013 and has been sold every holiday season until 2019, when Winter Spiced Cranberry replaced it. The variant competes with PepsiCo's Mist Twst Cranberry, which unlike Sprite Cranberry is sold year-round. An advertisement for this beverage featuring LeBron James inspired an Internet meme and, later, a horror game.
Sprite 6 Mix	2014	Sprite with additional cherry and orange flavors in addition to the lemon and lime. It was released as a collaboration between Sprite and LeBron James in the United States in 2014. It was sold again as "Sprite LeBron's Mix" in 2015.
Sprite Blast	2014	Sprite with sweet and sour flavors. It was released for the summer of 2014 in the United States, exclusive to 7-Eleven stores (at time of sale), and was sold only in 7.5 ounce single cans. The variety was also released in New Zealand in summer 2017 and was sold in all sizes.
Sprite Tropical	2015	A re-release of Sprite Remix Tropical, it was sold for a limited time in 2015, and again as "Sprite Tropical Mix" in 2016.
Sprite Cucumber	2017	Sprite with a cucumber flavor. Launched in 2017 in Russia and in June 2018 in Romania. In September 2021, the Russian version of the drink was made available in the United States at the reopened Club Cool attraction at Epcot in Walt Disney World.
Sprite Cherry	2017	Sprite with a cherry flavor. Launched in 2017 in the United States as a permanent variety.
MIX by Sprite: Tropic Berry	2018	Sprite with a tropical berry flavor. Similar to Sprite Tropical Mix, and fountain-exclusive to McDonald's. Distribution reduced in the spring of 2021 after the re-introduction of Hi-C Orange Lavaburst, which it replaced.
Sprite Winter Spiced Cranberry	2019	In 2019 for the holiday season, Sprite released Winter Spiced Cranberry, intended to be a replacement for Sprite Cranberry around the holiday season. The flavor is divisive among fans of the original, with some suggesting to add cranberry juice to the drink to make it taste more like the original.
Sprite Lymonade	2019	Sprite mixed with lemonade and 1% lemon juice.
Sprite 40% Less Sugar	2019	Sprite relaunched in Australia with a new recipe containing 40% less sugar (compared with old Sprite) in August 2019. It has no aspartame but replaces some of the sugar with Ace K and sucralose.
Sprite Ginger	2020	Sprite with an added note of ginger to complement the classic lemon–lime flavor.
Sprite Lemon+	2022	A lighter and tangier variety containing caffeine. Sold in Australia as a replacement to the Australian beverage Lift.
Sprite Lymonade Legacy	2023	Strawberry lemonade flavored variant of Sprite sold in the United States and Canada in May 2023 as a limited edition to coincide with the 50th Anniversary of Hip Hop.
Absolut Vodka and Sprite	2024	A ready-to-drink vodka/lemon–lime canned cocktail that was produced as part of a partnership between the Coca-Cola Company and Absolut Vodka. It was first introduced into the United Kingdom in February 2024 and will also be released in other European territories such as the Netherlands, Spain, and Germany later on in the year. The UK variety contains 5% ABV which varies depending on the market.
Sprite Chill Cherry Lime	2024	A cherry–lime flavored variant with cooling agents made to give the drink a "freezing" feel, sold originally as a limited edition in the United States and Canada in May 2024 for the summer season. However, due to high sales and reception, it was made a permanent edition to the lineup.
Sprite Vanilla Frost	2024	Sprite mixed with cream soda. It was sold in the United States for the 2024 and 2025 Christmas Seasons.
Sprite Chill Strawberry Kiwi	2025	A strawberry and kiwi fruit flavored variant with cooling agents made to give the drink a "freezing" feel. It was released in the United States as a Walmart exclusive in March 2025.
Sprite + Tea	2025	Sprite mixed with the taste of sweet tea. It was introduced as a limited edition in the United States and Canada in May 2025, and was sold until October. It will be re-released once again for a limited time in 2026.
Sprite Chill Mango Citrus	2026	A mango/citrus flavored variant with cooling agents made to give the drink a "freezing" feel. As with the Strawberry Kiwi variety, it was released in the United States as a Walmart exclusive in March 2026.
