= Sprite Lemon+ =

Soft drinks produced by The Coca-Cola Company

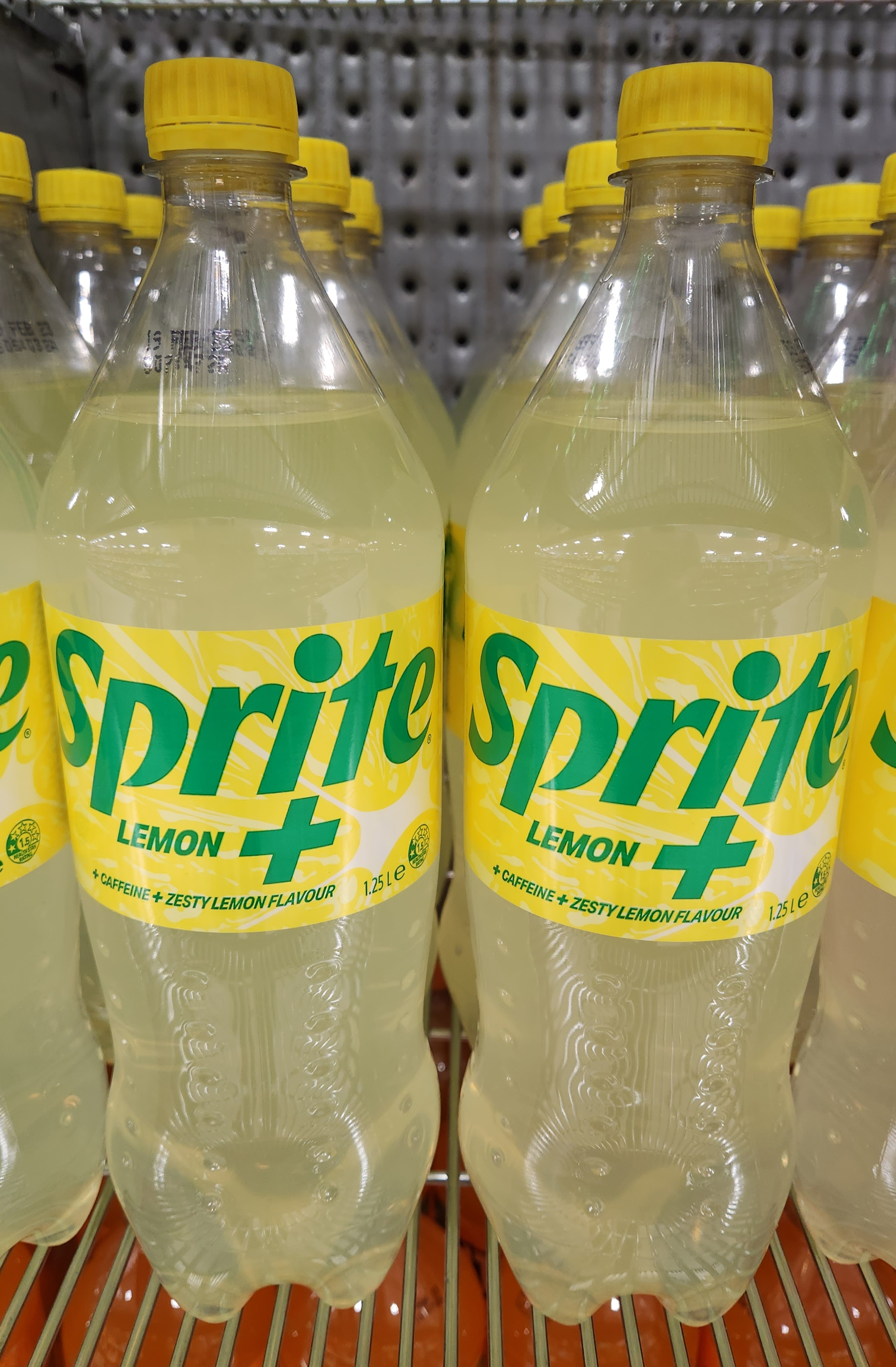
- Manufacturer: Coca-Cola Bottlers (Malaysia) Sdn Bhd
- Origin: Malaysia
- Color: Yellow
- Flavor: Lemon
- Variants: List: Sprite Lemon+; Sprite Lemon+ Zero Sugar; Sprite Lemon + Extract Sugar

Sprite Lemon+ is a range of primarily lemonade-flavoured soft drinks produced by The Coca-Cola Company in Malaysia under the Sprite brand. An artificially sweetened variety, Sprite Lemon+ Zero Sugar, is also available. Sprite Lemon+ was available in Australia until 2024.

== History ==
The Sprite brand was used to launch a new zesty lemon flavour variant with caffeine and marketed as Sprite Lemon+. This flavour was announced by Coca-Cola Europacific Partners on 13 September 2022, following months of rumours on social media.
