= Fanta =

Brand of carbonated drinks

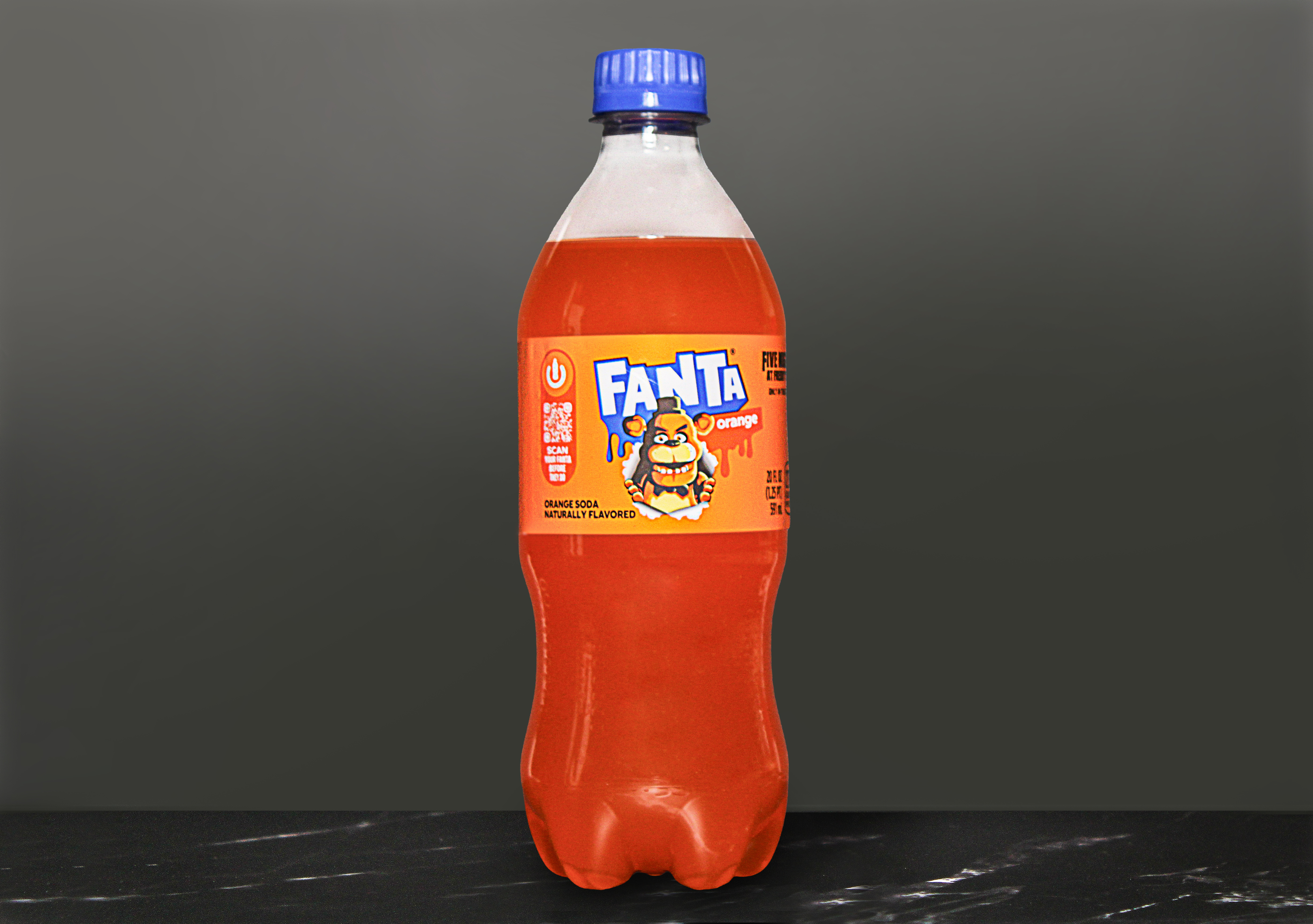
- A 20oz bottle of Orange Fanta, featuring a picture of Freddy Fazbear from Five Nights at Freddy's as part of a cross-promotion.
- Manufacturer: The Coca-Cola Company
- Origin: Germany (beverage); Italy (orange looks yellow version); Algeria (strawberry version); Brazil (grape and guaraná version); Costa Rica (Colita version); Sri Lanka (Portello version); United Kingdom (fruit twist version) (also known as exotic in Scandinavian countries); Thailand (fruit punch version)
- Introduced: 1940; 86 years ago in Germany
- Variants: See International availability
- Related products: Royal Tru, Sunkist, Crush, Slice, Hit, Mirinda, Tango, Bluna, Lilt.
- Website: fanta.com

Fanta (/ˈfæntə/) is a German-founded, American-owned brand of carbonated, fruit-flavored soft drinks created by Coca-Cola Deutschland under the leadership of German businessman Max Keith. Today, the brand features over 200 flavors worldwide.

Fanta originated as a Coca-Cola alternative after an American trade embargo against Nazi Germany disrupted the availability of standard Coca-Cola ingredients. The beverage quickly dominated the German market, selling three million cases by 1943. Fanta's current orange-flavored formulation was later developed in Italy in 1955. Real orange juice is used in the orange-flavored recipe in all markets except for the United States. In Panama, Fanta was branded as Kist until 2024.

== History ==
=== 1941–1949: Wartime product ===
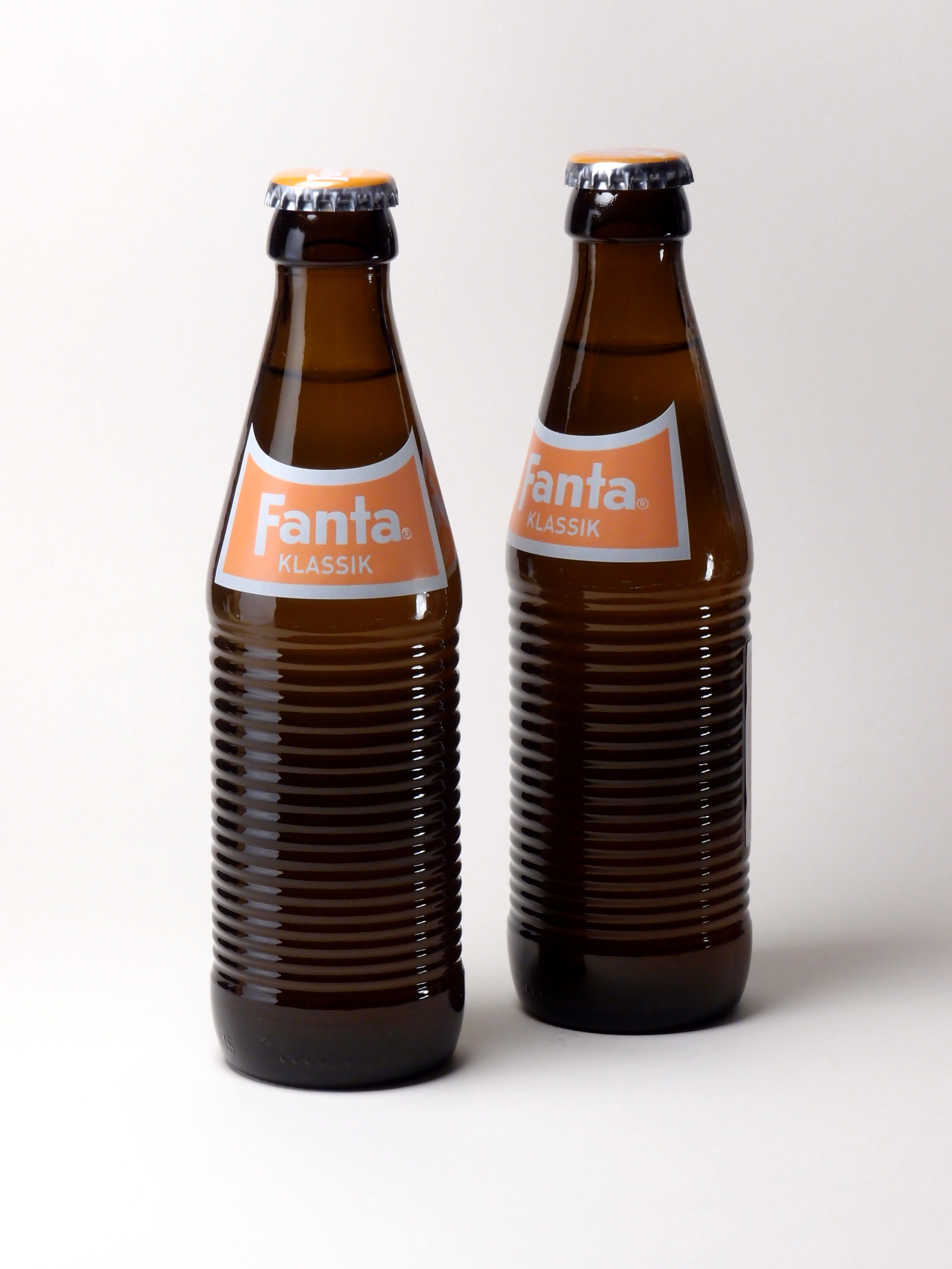
Fanta Klassik ("classic") was sold in Germany in 2015, marking the 75th anniversary of the drink.

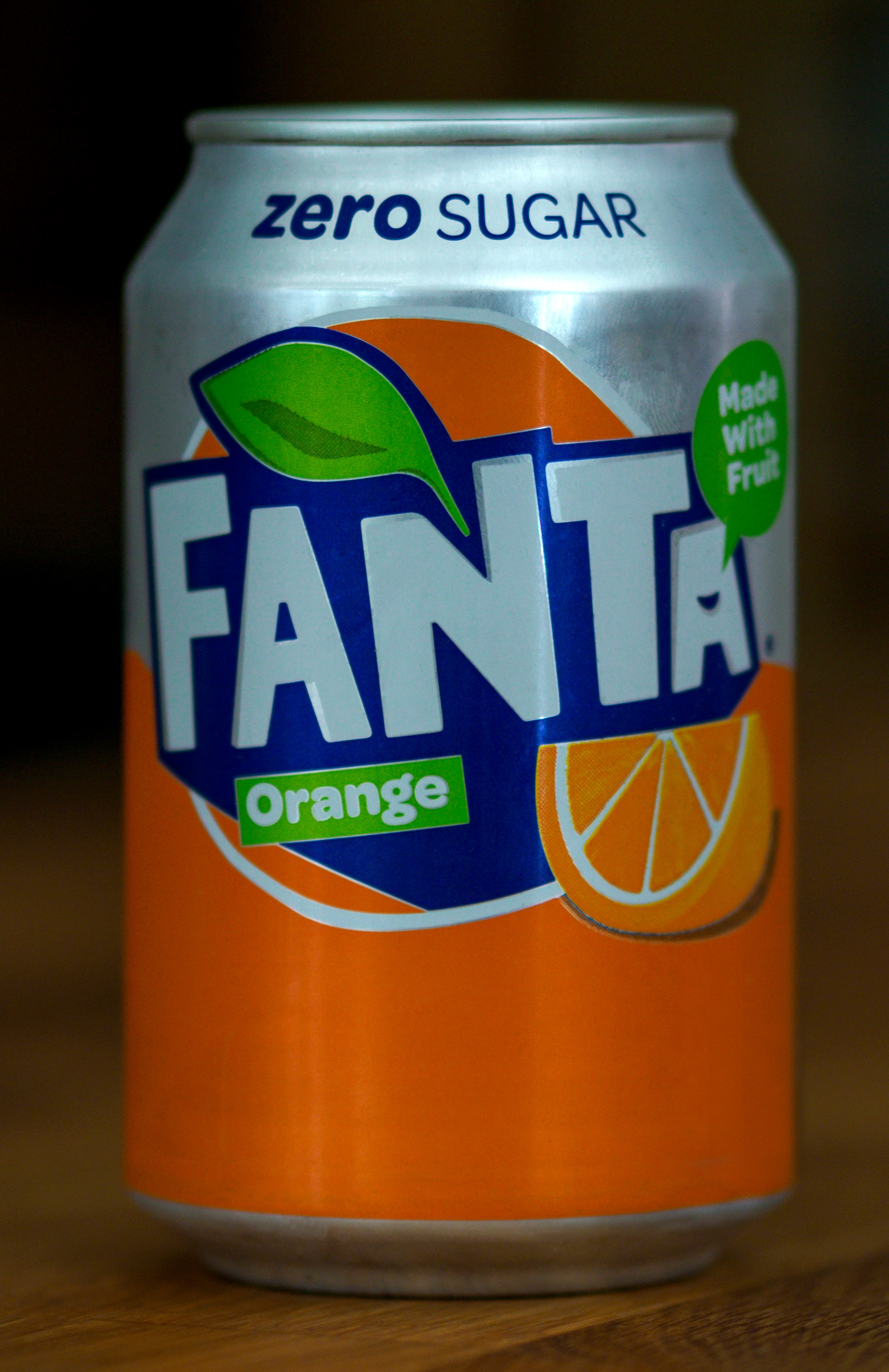
A can of zero sugar Fanta

During the Second World War, Germany was under a United States trade embargo and a British naval blockade; the import of Coca-Cola syrup was thus prohibited. To circumvent this, Max Keith, the head of Coca-Cola Deutschland (Coca-Cola GmbH), decided to create a new product for the German market, using only ingredients available in Germany at the time, including sugar beet, whey, and apple pomace.

He later described them as the "leftovers of leftovers". The name was the result of a brainstorming session, which started with Keith's exhorting his team to "use their imagination" (Fantasie in German), to which one of his salesmen, Joe Knipp, retorted "Fanta!".

The German plant had been cut off from Coca-Cola headquarters following the US's entry into the war after the German declaration of war against the United States in 1941. After the war, the Coca-Cola Company regained control of the plant, formula, and the trademarks to the new Fanta product—as well as the plant profits made during the war.

In 1943, 3 million cases of Fanta were sold in Germany. Many bottles were not consumed as a beverage but used as a cooking ingredient to add sweetness and flavor to soups and stews, as sugar was severely rationed.

During the war, the Dutch Coca-Cola plant in Amsterdam (N.V. Nederlandse Coca-Cola Maatschappij) suffered the same difficulties as the German Coca-Cola plant. Keith put the Fanta brand at the disposal of the Dutch Coca-Cola plant, of which he had been appointed the official caretaker. Dutch Fanta had a different recipe from German Fanta, using elderberries as a main ingredient.

Fanta production was discontinued in 1949. In 1955, in Naples, Italy, production of a new formulation with oranges began.

=== Since 1955: Modern product ===
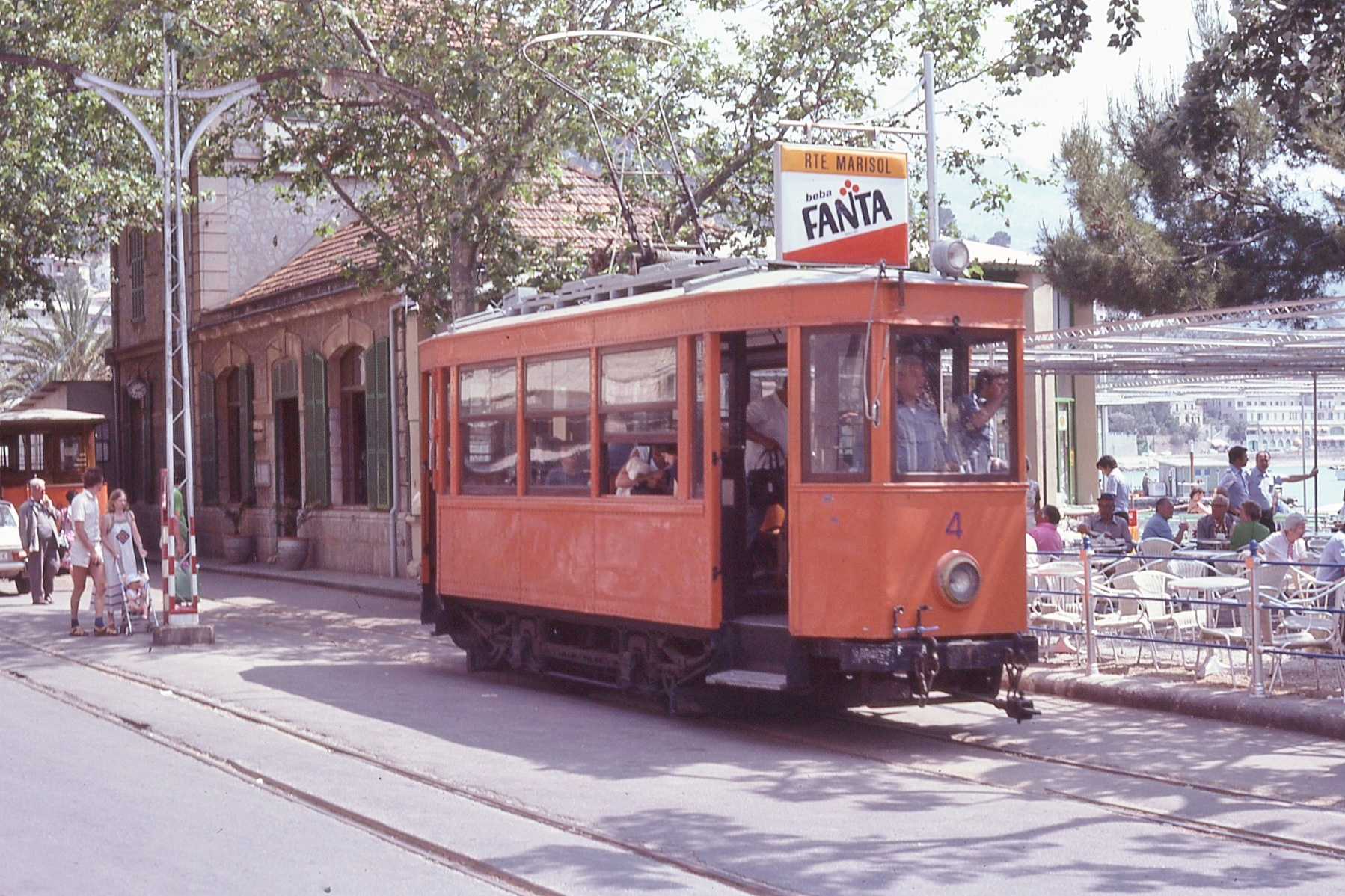
Fanta's logo including three oranges visible in café in Mallorca in the 1970s.

Following the launch of several drinks by Pepsi-Cola in the 1950s, Società Napoletana Imbottigliamento Bevande Gassate (SNIBEG) relaunched Fanta in 1955 with a different formulation. In 1960 Coca-Cola bought the brand, distributing it worldwide. The drink was heavily marketed in Europe, Asia, Africa, and South America, although it did not become widely available in the United States until the 1960s because the company feared it would undermine the strong market position of their flagship cola.

Even then, its availability was limited especially after the 1980s due to sister brand Minute Maid selling similar products under its own name. In 2001, Fanta received a national push due to the U.S.'s growing Hispanic population and the drink's proven popularity in Latin America.

The modern-day orange Fanta was first produced in Naples, Italy in 1955 by a local bottling plant using locally sourced oranges. The design of the classic annulated bottle comes from these years.

== International availability ==
=== Africa ===
In South Africa, Coca-Cola South Africa sells Fanta Orange, Fanta Orange No Sugar, Fanta Grape, and Fanta Pineapple. Fanta Exotic and Fanta Lemon are also available at certain retailers.

=== Asia ===
Coca-Cola Bottlers Philippines, Inc. (CCBPI) introduced Fanta in the early 1990s. During its production in the Philippines, Fanta and Royal coexisted together in the market. Fanta was available in Fanta Calamansi (introduced in 1994 and the only Fanta flavor exclusive to the Philippine market), Fanta Lemon, Fanta Mango, Fanta Green Apple, Fanta Fruit Punch and Fanta Root Beer (coincidentally coexisted with Royal Root Beer) and is the sole market that didn't introduce Fanta Orange in favor of Royal Tru-Orange. Royal, however, later introduced and reintroduced other flavors such as Royal Tru-Dalandan and Royal Tru-Strawberry during the coexistence of both brands. Fanta was eventually phased out in the 2000s and was absorbed by Royal as CCBPI's local brand for Fanta.

In Israel the Fanta flavors were marketed as Kinley because a small beverage company from Tiberias owned the Fenta brand, using the same spelling as Fanta in Hebrew. After that company ceased to exist, Coca Cola rebranded its fruity flavored sodas Fanta.

=== Europe ===
In Albania, Bosnia and Herzegovina, Croatia, Poland, Romania, Serbia and some other European countries, there is Fanta Shokata (a wordplay on "soc" which means both "elderberry" and "shock" in Romanian) based on an elderflower blossom extract drink. In Russia, however, "Shokata" is the rebranding of Fanta Citrus, which is more like a common lemonade. This version of the drink is clear, like ordinary lemonade, while the bottle is blue.

In the UK, the sugar content was reduced in 2017 to 4.6g per 100ml in the standard version (non-sugar free) to ensure that the product was below the 5g that would incur the country's sugary drink tax. This was a third lower than the recipe used before 2016, as some of the sugar was replaced by sweeteners.

In early February 2024, The Coca-Cola Company announced that Lilt (a pineapple and grapefruit soft drink sold in countries such as the UK and Ireland) would be rebranded as Fanta Pineapple and Grapefruit flavour on 14 February 2023.

=== North America ===
In Mexico, Fanta is made with cane sugar whereas the US version uses high fructose corn syrup.

=== South America ===
In Brazil, regional flavors such as guarana, passion fruit and cashew began to be sold between 2010 and 2020.

In Chile, Fanta is commonly combined with beer (also known as schop) and the shandy-like combination is known as fanschop.

== Marketing ==
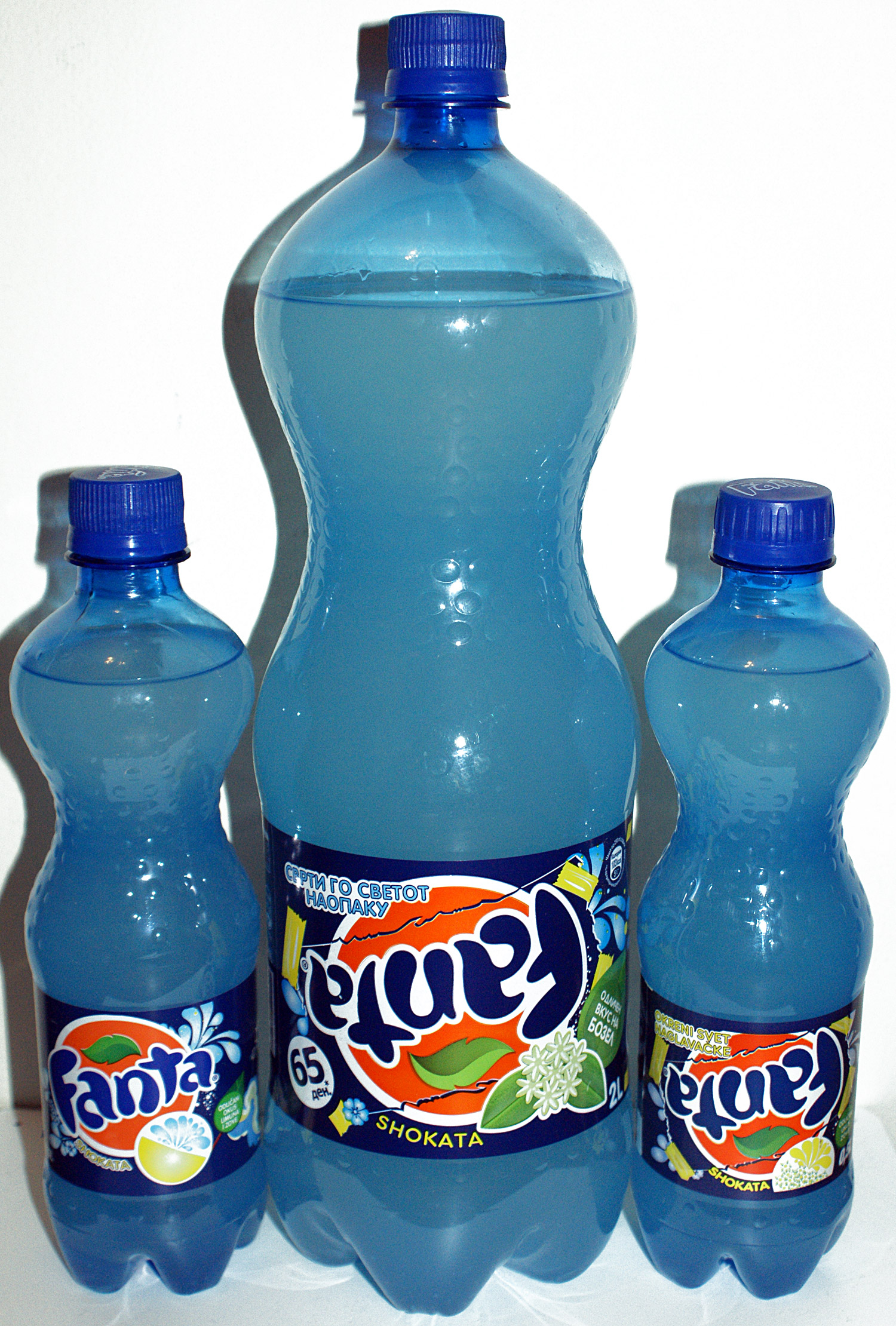
Fanta Shokata with labels upside down as part of the "turn the world upside down" ad campaign

A 2005 British television advertisement for Fanta Z, depicting people spitting out the drink, was the ninth most complained-about advert that year, according to the Advertising Standards Authority. 272 viewers complained that it encouraged copycat behaviour in children. The Authority therefore restricted the advert to post-9pm watershed viewing.

In February 2015, a 75th-anniversary version of Fanta was released in Germany. Packaged in glass bottles evoking the original design and with an authentic original wartime flavor including 30% whey and pomace, it is described on the packaging as "less sweet" and a German original. An associated television ad referenced the history of the drink and said the Coca-Cola company wanted to bring back "the feeling of the Good Old Times" which was interpreted by many to mean Nazi rule. The ad was subsequently replaced.

== Logo history ==
1962–1970

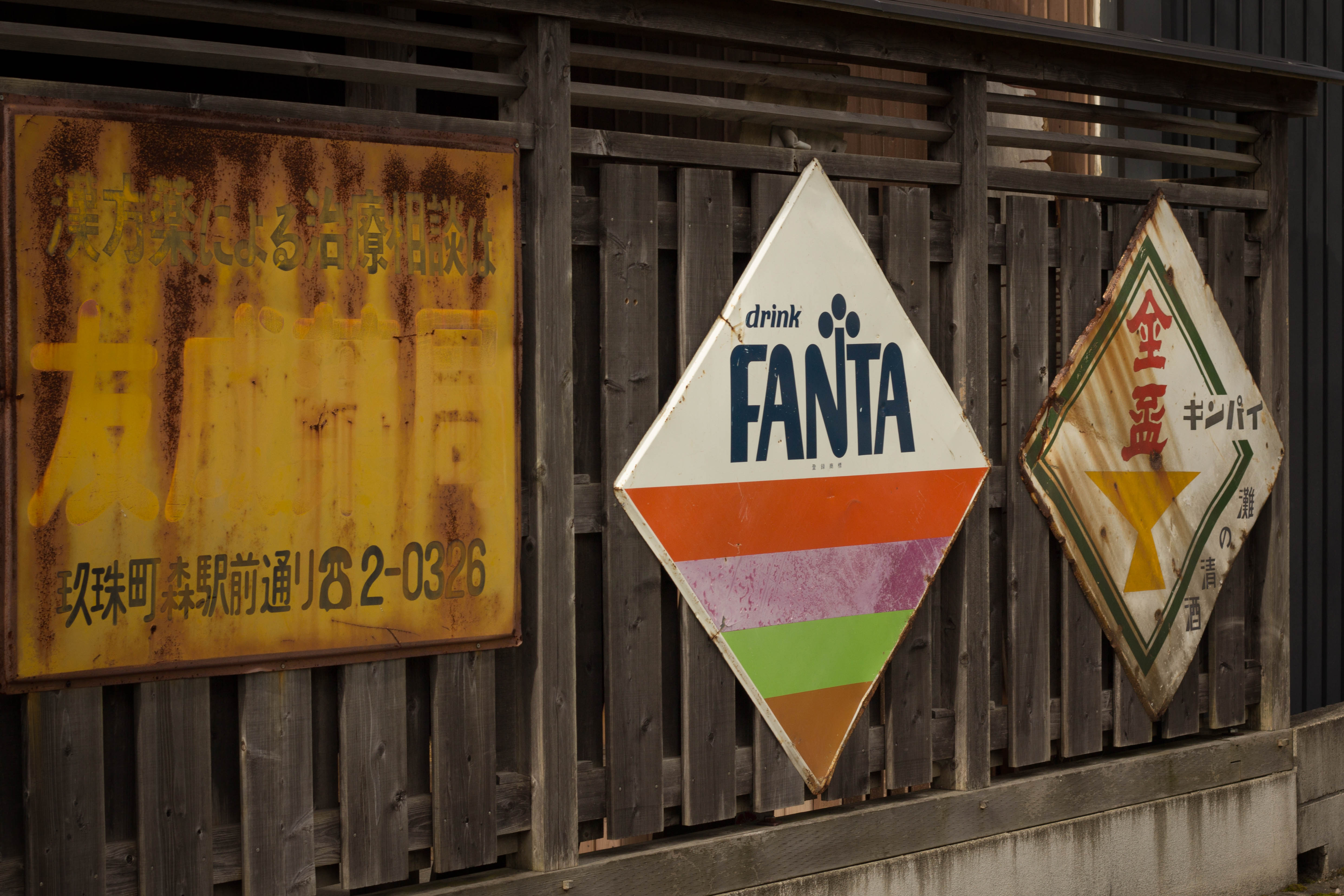
1972; logo including three oranges, in 1988 they added a green leaf.

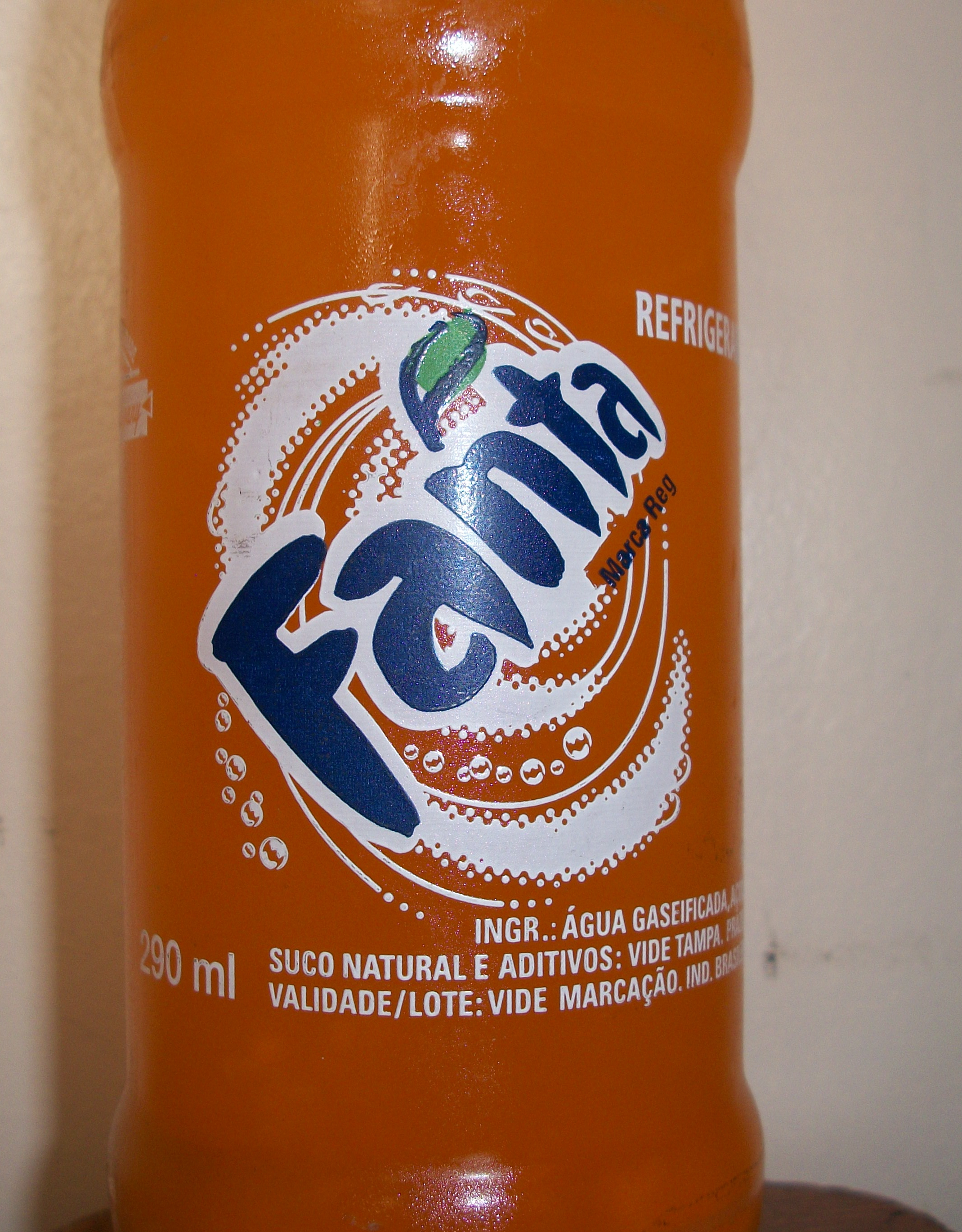
1997–2004

2008–2023; was still used in some countries after the 2016 rebranding.

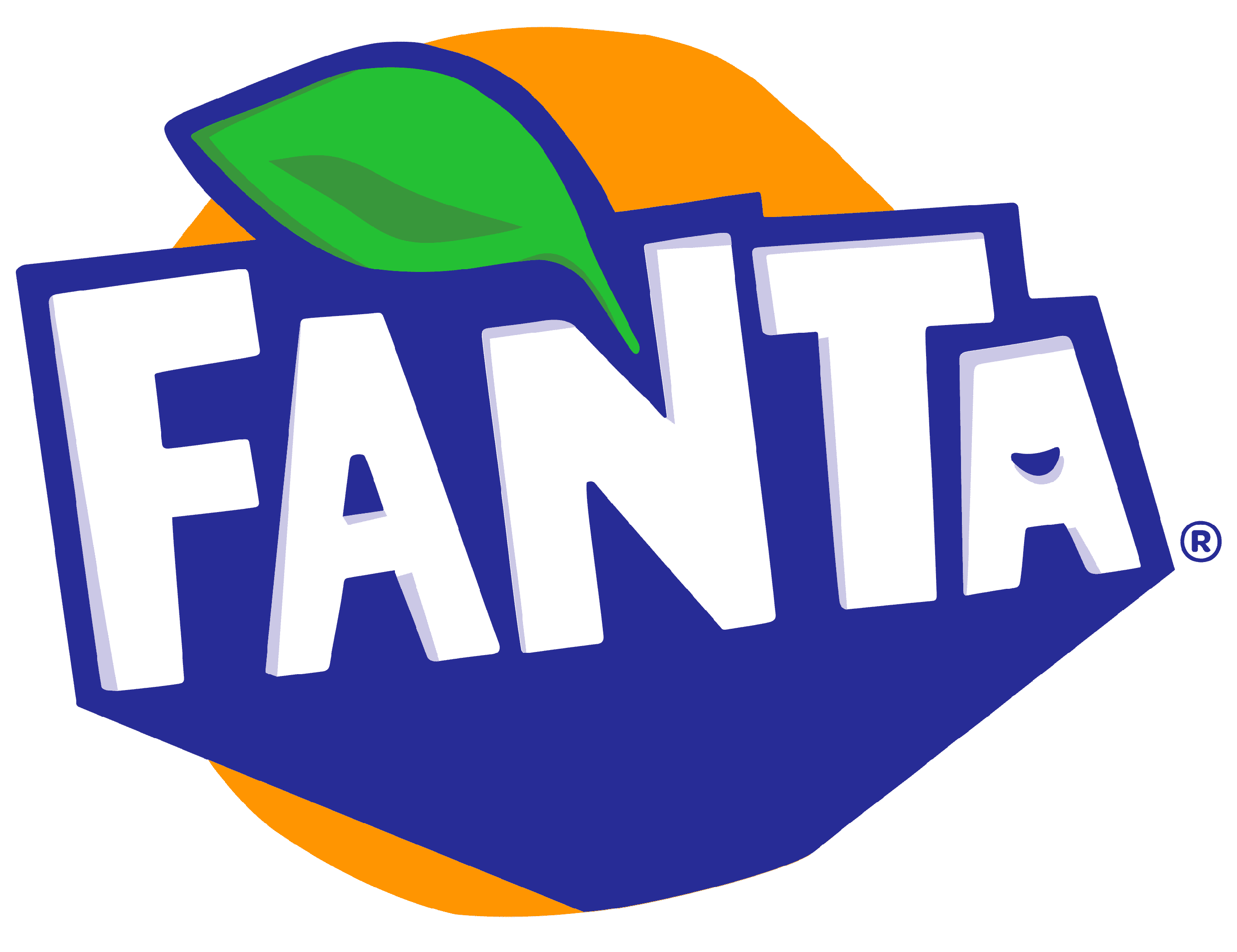
2016–2023 (international)

2023–present

== See also ==
- Fanta cake
- Orange drink
- Orangina
