= Abbey Well =

British Bottled Water Brand

- Type: Water beverage
- Manufacturer: Waters & Robson (1981–2008); Coca-Cola European Partners (2008–present)
- Origin: United Kingdom
- Introduced: 1981; 45 years ago
- Related products: Glaceau Smartwater
- Website: www.coca-cola.co.uk/drinks/abbey-well

Abbey Well (also sometimes branded as Schweppes Abbey Well) is a brand of bottled water produced by Coca-Cola European Partners in the United Kingdom.

== History ==
Abbey Well was originally produced by Waters & Robson in the early 1980s. The name comes from a location near to the source of the water, a 12th century Cistercian Abbey, Newminster Abbey, one of the favourite places of the founder of the company, Thomas Robson.

In 1981, a new bottling site was built in Morpeth, Northumberland to bottle Abbey Well at source. The company uses a 117-metre deep artesian well for its still water. As of 2008, the company had 91 employees, produced 30 million litres of water annually and had a turnover of £11 million. In 2000, the Abbey Well label featured a portrait of David Hockney by fellow artist, Peter Blake. At its source, Abbey Well filters through the area's white sandstone.

In 2008, the manufacturer of Abbey Well, Waters & Robson, was acquired by Coca-Cola Enterprises. The acquisition of Abbey Well marked Coca-Cola's third foray into the UK water market after its previous attempts using the Dasani and Malvern brands.

Coca-Cola was the official drink sponsor of 2012 Summer Olympics and they decided not to reintroduce its previous Dasani water brand which was still used in other countries to the UK market and used Abbey Well, branded under the Schweppes brand name (which Coca-Cola holds the UK rights to), to provide a locally sourced water brand for the event. To meet Olympic branding regulations, Abbey Well water was labeled as "Still Water" for on-camera appearances during the Games.

In 2014, £3.5 million was invested in the Morpeth site by Coca-Cola for the UK launch of Glaceau Smartwater. In 2016, £14 million was invested in the Morpeth site by Coca-Cola.

Waters & Robson's Morpeth site is still used by Coca-Cola European Partners today for Abbey Well as well as for their Glaceau Smartwater product and Schweppes Soda Water. It is currently the only Coca-Cola water site in the UK.

== See also ==
- Cool Ridge
- Mount Franklin Water
- Pump
- List of Coca-Cola brands
- List of bottled water brands
