= Waters & Robson =

- Company type: Limited company
- Industry: Soft drinks Bottled water
- Founded: 1910; 116 years ago in Morpeth, United Kingdom
- Founder: Thomas Robson; Stephen Waters
- Defunct: 2008
- Fate: Acquired by Coca-Cola
- Headquarters: Morpeth, Northumberland, United Kingdom
- Area served: United Kingdom
- Products: Abbey Well
- Number of employees: 91 (2008)

Waters & Robson was a British manufacturer of bottled water and soft drinks.

== History ==
Waters & Robson was established in 1910 in Morpeth, Northumberland by Stephen Waters and Thomas Robson as a soft drinks manufacturer. Robson named the source of the water Abbey Well, after his favourite nearby 12th century Cistercian Abbey, Newminster Abbey. At its source Abbey Well filters through the area's white sandstone.

In the 1980s Thomas' grandson Tony Robson was now heading the company and decided to move into bottled water, and the current Abbey Well water brand was created. In 1981 a new bottling site was built in Morpeth. The company uses a 117-metre deep artesian well for its still water. As of 2008 the company had 91 employees, produced 30 million litres of water annually and had a turnover of £11 million.

=== Acquisition by Coca-Cola ===
In 2008 the company was acquired by Coca-Cola Enterprises. Its Morpeth site is still used by Coca-Cola European Partners today for Abbey Well as well as for their Glaceau Smartwater. It is currently the only Coca Cola water site in the UK.
