= List of companies of Fiji =

Fiji is an island country consisting of more than 300 islands located in Oceania. Although the economy of Fiji serves as one of the main economic centers of the South Pacific islands, it is mostly made up of agriculture and tourism. The latter contributes to more than 40 percent of the nation's GDP.

The three main export partners of Fiji in 2021 were the United States, Australia, and China and the three main import partners were New Zealand, China, and Singapore.

This list includes notable companies with a primary headquarters located in the country. The industry and sector both follow the Industry Classification Benchmark taxonomy and organizations that have ceased operations are included and noted as defunct.

Notable companies Status: P=Private, S=State; A=Active, D=Defunct
Name	Industry	Sector	Headquarters	Founded	Notes	Status	
Air Fiji	Consumer services	Airlines	Nausori	1967	Defunct 2009	P	D
Fiji Airways	Consumer services	Airlines	Nadi	1947	Partially owned by the Fiji government	S	A
Fiji Link	Consumer services	Airlines	Nadi	1980	Owned by Fiji Airways	P	A
Fiji Sugar Corporation	Food producers	Sugar	Lautoka	1972	Sugar milling	S	A
Northern Air	Consumer services	Airlines	Suva	2007	Domestic airline	P	A
Pacific Island Air	Consumer services	Airlines	Namaka	1999	Air charter	P	A
Paradise Beverages	Beverages	Brewers	Suva	1957	Manufacturer of Fiji Bitter	P	A
Post Fiji	Industrials	Delivery services	Suva	1871	Postal service	S	A
Procera Music	Media	Entertainment	Suva	1972	Largest record label in Fiji	P	A
Reddy Group	Real estate	Real-estate investment and services	Suva	1947	Specializes in real-estate development	P	A
