= La Vanguardia =

Spanish newspaper

- Front page of La Vanguardia, 21 June 2024
- Type: Daily newspaper
- Format: Tabloid
- Owner: Grupo Godó
- Publisher: Javier Godó (Earl of Godó)
- Editor: Jordi Juan
- Founded: February 1, 1881; 145 years ago
- Political alignment: Liberalism, Catalanism, centrism, centre-right
- Language: Spanish (since 1881) and Catalan (since 2011)
- Headquarters: Barcelona, Spain
- Circulation: 196,824 (2011)
- Sister newspapers: Mundo Deportivo
- ISSN: 1133-4940 (print); 2462-3415 (web)
- Website: www.lavanguardia.com

La Vanguardia (Catalan: [lə βəŋˈɡwaɾðiə]; Spanish: [la βaŋˈɡwaɾðja], lit. 'The Vanguard') is a Spanish daily newspaper founded in 1881. It is printed in Spanish and, since 3 May 2011, also in Catalan. It has its headquarters in Barcelona and is Catalonia's leading newspaper.

Despite being mostly distributed in Catalonia, La Vanguardia is Spain's fourth-highest circulation in the print press among general-interest newspapers, trailing only the three main Madrid-based ones – El País, El Mundo and ABC – all of which are national newspapers with offices and local editions throughout the country.

The newspaper's editorial line leans to the centre of politics and is moderate in its opinions, but during Francoist Spain, it followed the Francoist ideology. It retains Catholic sensibilities and strong ties to the Spanish nobility through the Godó family.

== History and profile ==
=== Beginnings ===
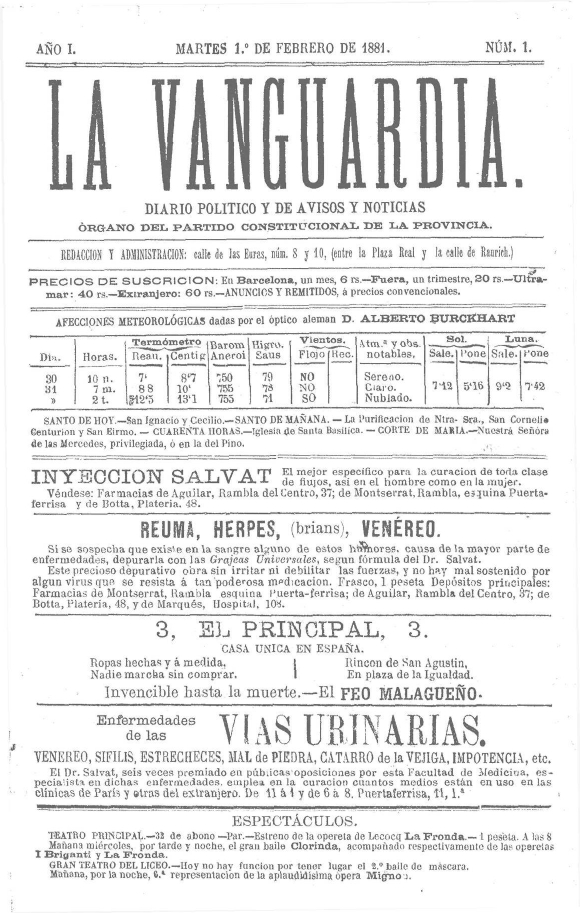
First issue of La Vanguardia, 1881

On 1 February 1881 in Barcelona, two businessmen from Igualada, Carlos and Bartolomé Godó, first published the paper. It was defined as a Diario político de avisos y notícias (Political Newspaper of Announcements and News), intended as a means of communication for a faction of the Liberal Party that wanted to gain control over the Barcelona city council.

La Vanguardia is one of the oldest papers in Spain as well as the only Catalan newspaper that has survived all the Spanish regime changes, from the restoration of Alfonso XII to the 21st century.

La Vanguardia is part of the Grupo Godó. Carlos Godó Valls took over the business in 1931. His death was one year after the death of his wife, Montserrat Muntañola Trinxet, succeeding as president his son Javier Godó Muntañola in 1987.

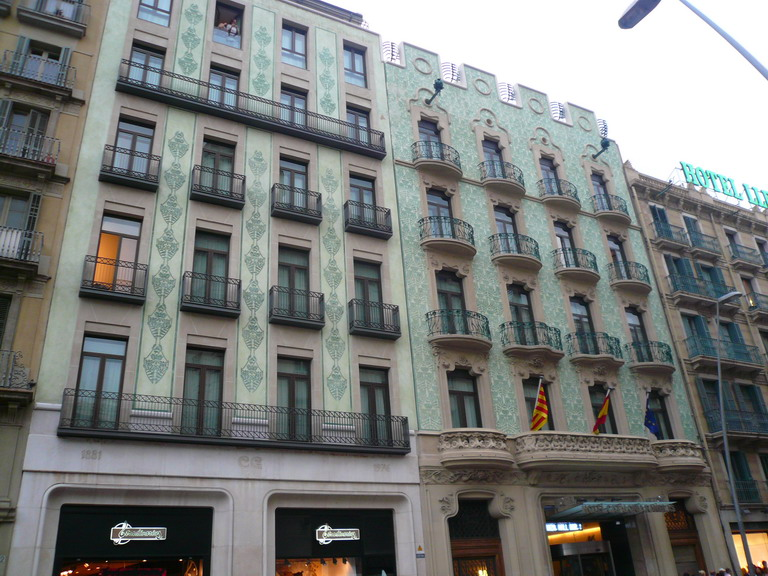
Former headquarters at La Vanguardia

=== Title inclusion ===
From 1939 to 1978, its title included the word Española to accommodate a better state ideology. The paper was one of two major dailies in Francoist Spain together with ABC. In the late 1970s and 1980s, La Vanguardia had close connections with Convergence and Union alliance.

In 1987, La Vanguardia received the second largest amount of state aid. La Vanguardia was published in berliner format until 2 October 2007 when it began to use tabloid format. The daily was awarded the World's Best Designed Newspaper for 1994 by the Society for News Design (SND).

== Circulation ==
The circulation of La Vanguardia was 221,451 copies in February 1970 and 218,390 copies in February 1975. Five years later, the circulation of the paper was 188,555 copies in February 1980.

In 1993, La Vanguardia had a circulation of 208,029 copies, making it the fifth best-selling newspaper in Spain. In 1994 it was the fourth best selling newspaper in the country with a circulation of 207,112 copies.

La Vanguardia had a circulation of 205,000 copies in 2001. Its circulation was 203,000 copies in 2003. Between June 2006 and July 2007 the daily had a circulation of 209,735 copies. The 2008 circulation of the paper was 213,413 copies. It sold 196,824 copies in 2011.

== Language ==
The newspaper has printed daily in two parallel editions, one in Spanish and, since 3 May 2011, another in Catalan. The Spanish name La Vanguardia is used for both editions (rather than L'Avantguarda, the Catalan translation). Before the birth of the Catalan edition, letters to the editor submitted in Catalan were always left untranslated.

La Vanguardia has been open about their use of an automatic translation tool to produce both language editions, claiming that "an average of 80,000 words are translated from Spanish to Catalan or vice versa each day".

== Premios Vanguardia ==
The Premios Vanguardia known in English as the Vanguardia Awards or La Vanguardia Prizes, are annual awards presented by the newspaper. The awards aim to recognise the work of organisations and people who are high achievers in the social, economic, political, or cultural fields. The jury consists of several prominent people, along with members of La Vanguardia's editorial staff.

The awards were created in 2023 by the Godó Group to celebrate the recent 140th anniversary of the newspaper. The inaugural awards were presented at the National Museum of Art of Catalonia in Barcelona in 2023, and attended by the King Felipe and Queen Letizia of Spain.

=== 2023 ===
In the inaugural edition in 2023, they were presented by the King of Spain, to the following winners:

- Premio Empresaria del Año (Businesswoman of the Year): Sol Daurella
- Premio Empresario del Año (Businessman of the Year): Marc Puig, CEO of fashion company Puig
- Premio Innovación (Innovation): Ignacio Cirac, physicist
- Premio Talento Joven Internacional (Young Talent Award): Bad Gyal, Spanish singer-songwriter
- Premio Cultura (Culture): Lita Cabellut, painter
- Premio Impulso Ciudades (Impulse Cities): Grant Dalton, New Zealand sailor
- Premio In Memoriam: Josep Piqué, Spanish politician, and Juan Antonio Samaranch, Spanish sports administrator

=== 2024 ===
In 2024 they were presented on 16 September by the prime minister of Spain, Pedro Sánchez. The winners in each of the six categories were:

- Premio Sostenibilidad (Sustainability): Audrey Azoulay, director-general of UNESCO
- Premio Empresario del Año (Entrepreneur of the Year): Gabriel Escarrer, CEO of Melià Hotels Internacional,
- Premio Innovación y Ciencia (Innovation and Science): Mateo Valero, director of the Barcelona Supercomputing Center
- Premio Impulso Ciudades (Impulse Cities): Pau Relat, president of Fira de Barcelona trade fair
- Premio Cultura (Culture): Eduardo Mendoza, writer
- Premio In Memoriam: Joan Oró, biochemist
- Premio Internacional: Yulia Navalnaya, widow of Russian opposition leader Alexei Navalny, president of the Anti-Corruption Foundation

== Notable contributors ==
- John Carlin
- Julià Guillamon
- Quim Monzó
- Fernando Krahn
- Pedro Madueño
- Sergi Pàmies

== See also ==
- Gaziel
- A dos vientos. Criticas y semblanzas
