= Coca-Cola Amatil =

Australian beverage company

Coca-Cola Amatil Limited
- Traded as: ASX: CCL (1972–2021)
- Industry: Beverage
- Founded: 1904; 122 years ago
- Defunct: 10 May 2021; 5 years ago
- Fate: Merged with Coca-Cola European Partners to form Coca-Cola Europacific Partners
- Successor: Coca-Cola Europacific Partners
- Headquarters: Coca-Cola Place; North Sydney, New South Wales, Australia
- Area served: Australia; New Zealand; Indonesia; Papua New Guinea; Fiji; Samoa
- Products: Coca-Cola, Diet Coke, Deep Spring, Fanta, Kirks, Lift, Mother, Mount Franklin Spring Water, Nestea, Powerade, Pump, Sprite, Sprite Zero
- Services: Manufacturing and distribution of alcoholic and non-alcoholic beverages
- Revenue: ▼ A$5.12 billion (2014)
- Operating income: ▼ A$502.8 million (2014)
- Net income: ▼ A$79.9 million (2014) (-82.5%)
- Owners: The Coca-Cola Company (30.8%); HSBC (16%); National Nominees (11%)
- Number of employees: 14,700 (December 2014)
- Divisions: Australia, New Zealand, Indonesia, Papua New Guinea, Fiji, Samoa
- Website: www.ccamatil.com

Coca-Cola Amatil Limited (CCAL) was an Australian bottler of non-alcoholic beverages that existed from 1904 to 2021, when it merged with Coca-Cola European Partners to form Coca-Cola Europacific Partners. It was one of the largest bottlers of non-alcoholic ready-to-drink beverages in the Asia-Pacific region, and one of the world's five major Coca-Cola bottlers. CCA operated in six countries—Australia, New Zealand, Indonesia, Papua New Guinea, Fiji and Samoa. The company also bottled beer and coffee.

== Products ==
CCA's diversified portfolio of products included carbonated soft drinks, spring water, sports drinks and energy drinks, fruit juices, iced tea, flavoured milk, coffee, tea and alcohol. Coca-Cola Amatil distributed a number of sparkling, still and other non-alcoholic beverages. Some of these include:

=== Water ===
- Mount Franklin Water
- Pump
- Neverfail
- Peats Ridge Pure
- AdeS (Indonesia)
- Aquarius Water
- Kiwi Blue (New Zealand)
- Pure Drop (New Zealand)
- Nature's Own Water (Papua New Guinea)

=== Non-alcoholic beverages ===
- Coca-Cola
- Diet Coke
- Coca-Cola Vanilla
- Leed
- Sprite
- Sprite Zero
- Fanta
- Lift
- Lemon & Paeroa
- Deep Spring
- Mother
- Kirks
- Bisleri
- Glaceau Vitamin Water
- Powerade
- e2
- Nestea
- Australian Bitters Company
- Goulburn Valley
- Grinders Coffee
- Lift plus
- Kiwi Blue
- Keri Juice
- Rose's Cordial Lemon
- Fuze Tea
- Barista Bros
- Bu Energy Drink

=== Alcoholic beverages ===
- Maker's Mark
- Jim Beam
- Knob Creek
- Booker's
- Basil Hayden's
- Vox
- Vodka O
- Canadian Club
- Old Crow
- Kilbeggan Distillery
- Sauza Tequila
- Laphroaig distillery
- Galliano
- Bols
- Bounty Rum
- Tribe
- Ratu Rum

=== Beer & cider ===
- Arvo
- Australian Beer Co
- Blue Moon
- Coors
- Feral Brewing Company
- Fiji Bitter
- Fiji Light
- Fiji Stout
- Fiji Gold
- Fiji Gold Moli
- Island Brewing Company
- Magners
- Miller Brewing Company
- Pressman's Cider
- Rekorderlig
- Samuel Adams
- Taki Premium Lager
- Vailima
- Vonu Pure Lager
- Yenda Brewing Company

=== Hot beverages ===
- Grinders Coffee
- Romanza coffee
- FIX Coffee

== Countries served ==
As at December 2014, Coca-Cola Amatil employed 14,700 people in six countries across the Asia-Pacific region. The company was the bottler of Coca-Cola products in Australia, New Zealand, Indonesia, Papua New Guinea, Fiji and Samoa.

== Ownership ==
Coca-Cola Amatil was listed on the Australian Securities Exchange, with The Coca-Cola Company holding around one third of the shares, as it did with each of its primary or "anchor" bottlers in the worldwide Coca-Cola system. Amatil and The Coca-Cola Company were also joint owners of Coca-Cola Bottling Indonesia (CCBI).

== History ==
The company's Australian origins date to 1903 as the tobacco company British Tobacco (Australia). Its first foray into soft drinks came in 1964 with the purchase of Coca-Cola Bottlers (Perth), and the company was listed on the Australian Stock Exchange in 1972. Soft drinks and snack foods gradually became the primary focus of the company, and it was eventually renamed Allied Manufacturing and Trade Industries Limited in 1973 and Amatil Limited in 1977. It began to expand bottling operations overseas in Europe, purchasing a Coca-Cola bottling plant in Australia in 1982 and expanding into Fiji and New Zealand in 1987. A majority stake was purchased by The Coca-Cola Company in 1989. In the same year Amatil ceased its involvement in cigarette manufacturing with the sale of its WD & HO Wills division to British American Tobacco.

Amatil's snack food operations were sold in 1992, and its European operations were spun off into a new company, Coca-Cola Beverages, in 1998. Expansion into Asia continued, though Filipino bottling was eventually sold to San Miguel Brewery and parent The Coca-Cola Company. Amatil had facilities all over Australia, with key sites at Northmead (NSW), North Sydney (NSW), Richlands (QLD), Moorabbin (VIC) and Hazelmere (WA). CCA announced on 22 February 2017 that it would be closing the Thebarton site on Port Road early in 2019 as there was no space to expand it, and would be expanding the Richlands site in Queensland. From 2006 to 2011, Amatil operated a joint venture (named Pacific Beverages) with SABMiller to distribute its drinks in Australia. In 2011, SABMiller acquired Foster's Group and full ownership of Pacific Beverages; in exchange, Foster's sold its Fiji and Samoa operations to Amatil in 2012.

In May 2021, CCA was acquired by Coca-Cola European Partners for A$9.8 billion, forming the new largest Coca-Cola bottling firm Coca-Cola Europacific Partners. At the time of the sale, Amatil's group managing director was Alison Watkins, and the board chairman was Ilana Atlas.

== Container deposit schemes ==
Coca-Cola Amatil opposed proposals for Northern Territory and Western Australian container deposit schemes between 2011 and 2013. Former Northern Territory treasurer Delia Lawrie claimed that Coca-Cola offered to fund her political opponents (the Country Liberal Party), to oppose a container deposit scheme, a claim the company strongly denied.

In 2013, Coca-Cola Amatil joined with Schweppes and Lion in a legal challenge against the Northern Territory Government's 'Cash for Containers' recycling scheme arguing it breached Australia's Mutual Recognition Act 1992. This Act creates a legal requirement that "goods produced in or imported into the first State, that may lawfully be sold in that State... (may) be sold in the second State." Beverage companies argued that the recently introduced Cash for Containers scheme, which doubled recycling rates to 30% in the Northern Territory in the limited time it operated, hindered this right by requiring the company to implement different production processes for the same product in different states and territories. The Federal Court ruled in favour of the beverage companies. The ruling created a public backlash with hostile posts on Coca-Cola's Facebook page and calls for a boycott.

Coca-Cola Amatil argued that the Cash for Containers scheme was ineffective and costly suggesting a "National Bin Network" as an alternative solution. The Council of Australian Governments found the economic cost of a national container deposit scheme would be between $1.4 and $1.76 billion; however, research undertaken by the Boomerang Alliance in 2008 suggested that such a scheme would in fact bring about saving of up to $84 million. Organisations such as Keep Australia Beautiful and the Boomerang Alliance supported the initiative as an addition to Cash for Containers, but argued that if used alone it would make a comparatively insignificant difference to recycling rates.

Former Northern Territory Chief Minister Terry Mills stated that he would continue to fight against Coca-Cola for Cash for Containers, and called on other states and territories to support the scheme.

== See also ==
- Swire Coca-Cola – Hong Kong-based bottler, with investment in bottling business in China
- Frucor Suntory
- British-Australasian Tobacco Company
