= PBFL =

PBFL may refer to:

- Pompano Beach, Florida, a city in Florida and in the United States
- Paradise Beverages (Fiji) Limited, Fijian alcoholic beverage producer
