= Deep Spring (beverage brand) =

Beverage brand

- Type: Spring water
- Manufacturer: Coca-Cola Amatil
- Origin: Australia
- Introduced: 1981; 45 years ago
- Related products: Pump, Spring Water
- Website: https://www.ccamatil.com/au/Our-beverages/Deep-Spring

Deep Spring Water is a brand of spring water available in Australia and New Zealand. It is a division of Coca-Cola Amatil.

== Products ==
Deep Spring Water sells spring water in 400 ml, 500 ml, 600 ml, 1-litre, 1.5-litre sparkling and 2-litre sizes.

Deep Spring sells several different flavours, most of which are based on and/or made from fruit. The flavours are:

- Lemon & Lime Citrus
- Orange & Mango
- Orange & Passionfruit
- Orange & Berry Twist
- Sparkling Natural Mineral Water

== See also ==
- Cool Ridge
- Mount Franklin Water
- Pump
- List of Coca-Cola brands
- List of bottled water brands
