= Beer in Fiji =

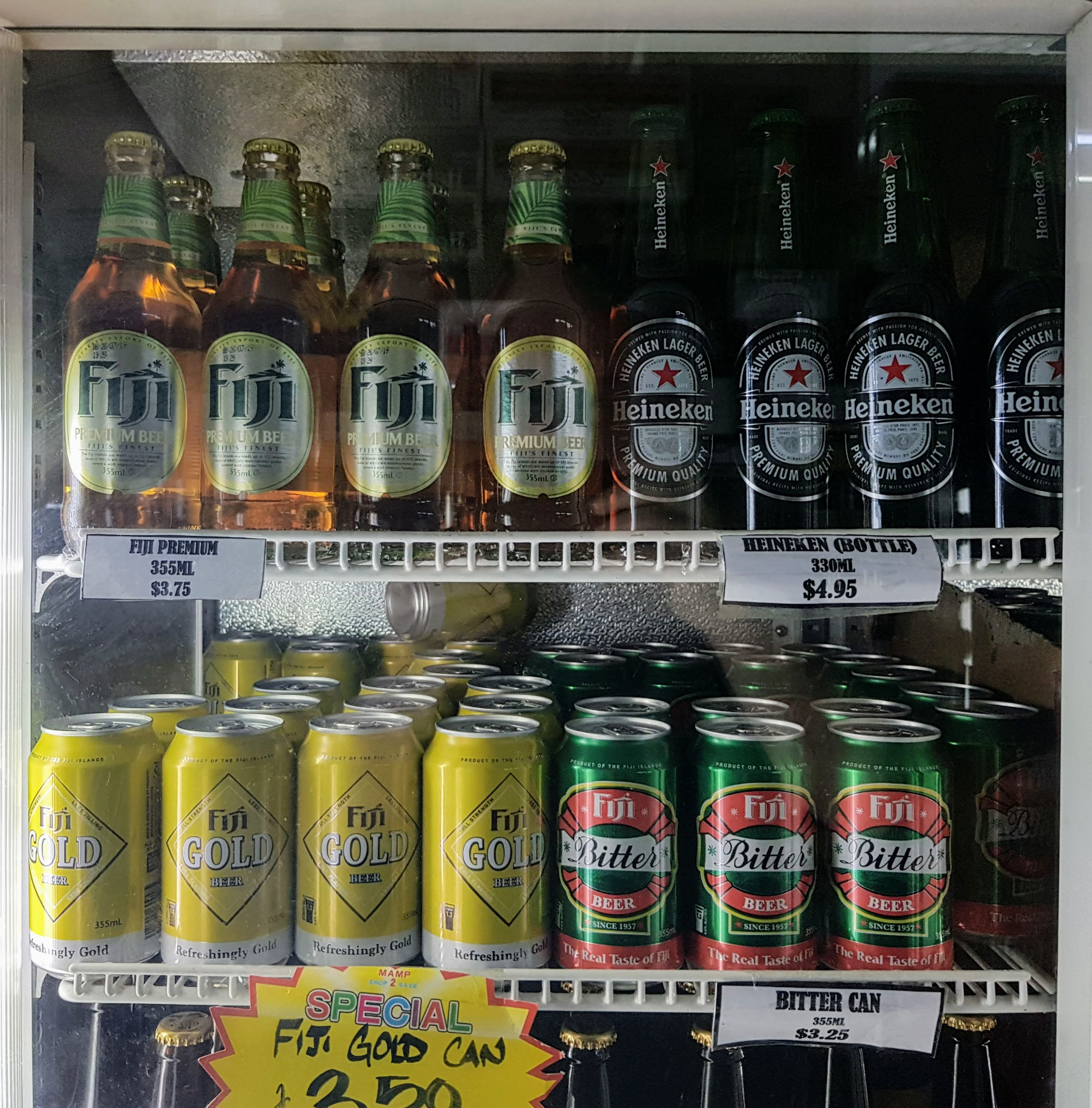
A selection of beers on sale in Fiji

The commercial brewing of beer in Fiji only commenced in 1957 and the market is dominated by a single producer, Paradise Beverages (Fiji) Limited.

The Fijian word for beer is bia.

== History ==
There was no alcohol in Fiji until the arrival of outsiders. Before this, yaqona (kava) was the traditional ceremonial drink used by men. In Fiji alcohol in various forms was introduced in the early 19th century by explorers, traders, whalers and to some extent missionaries. Missionaries of the London Missionary Society and the Methodist Church arrived in the 1830s.

During the Second World War, American soldiers introduced brewing and distillation with which the Fijian soldiers became familiarised. Fiji became a British colony in 1874 and achieved independence in 1970. As in the other Pacific Islands, a permit system was set up to control alcohol accessibility. In Fiji, the permit system did not apply to Europeans, but only to Fijians and Indians.

No permits were issued to women, either Indian or Fijian, or to young men (under the 25 years in the case of Indians, and under 30 years in the case of Fijians). In 1958 restrictions on access to beer were removed for adult males of any race and four years later, in 1962, adult males were allowed access to any alcoholic beverage. The restriction on the sale of alcohol to females was repealed in 1969.

In 2019 the average consumption of alcohol per capita (15+) was 1.59 litres (0.42 US gal), 2.6 litres (0.69 US gal) when adjusted to include tourist consumption, with beer being 70% of all alcohol consumed. Since 2014, consumption of beer per capita in Fiji has fallen by 0.9% on an annual basis. The peak consumption of 2.16 litres (0.57 US gal) occurring in 1990. In 2019, the country was number 95 amongst all other countries in beer consumption per capita.

Since 2014 the amount of domestic beer produced has steadily increased 5.6% annually. In 2017 Fiji was ranked number 123 in domestic beer production in the world, producing 22,000 tonnes (22,000 long tons; 24,000 short tons). Fiji exported US$$302,620 worth of beer in 2019, a decrease of 2% from year to year, having peaked in 2017 at US$485,926. It was ranked at 116 in the world. The importation of foreign beer has remained stable since 2014 at 1,000 tonnes (980 long tons; 1,100 short tons), and the country sits at number 135 in the world.

In Fiji homebrewing is becoming increasingly popular. The home-brews are generally stronger than the commercially produced beer, sometimes containing up to three times the alcohol content of commercially produced beer, and because they are made in secret little was known about how much home-brew is being produced in the country. In 1995 the unrecorded consumption of alcohol in Fiji was estimated to be 1.0 L (0.26 US gal) of pure alcohol per capita (15+).

== Microbreweries ==
The country's first microbrewery, Island Brewing Company, commenced operations in 2009. In March 2014 it was acquired by Paradise Beverages. Currently the country's only independent brewery is Kailoma Brewing Company, which was established in 2017. Their brewery currently produces three beers: Mokusiga Pacific Lager; Cloudies Summer Ale; and Bula Bitter Brew. The current production capacity is 1,000 litres (260 US gal) per week and their beers are sold throughout Fiji.

== See also ==
- Paradise Beverages
- Samoa Breweries
