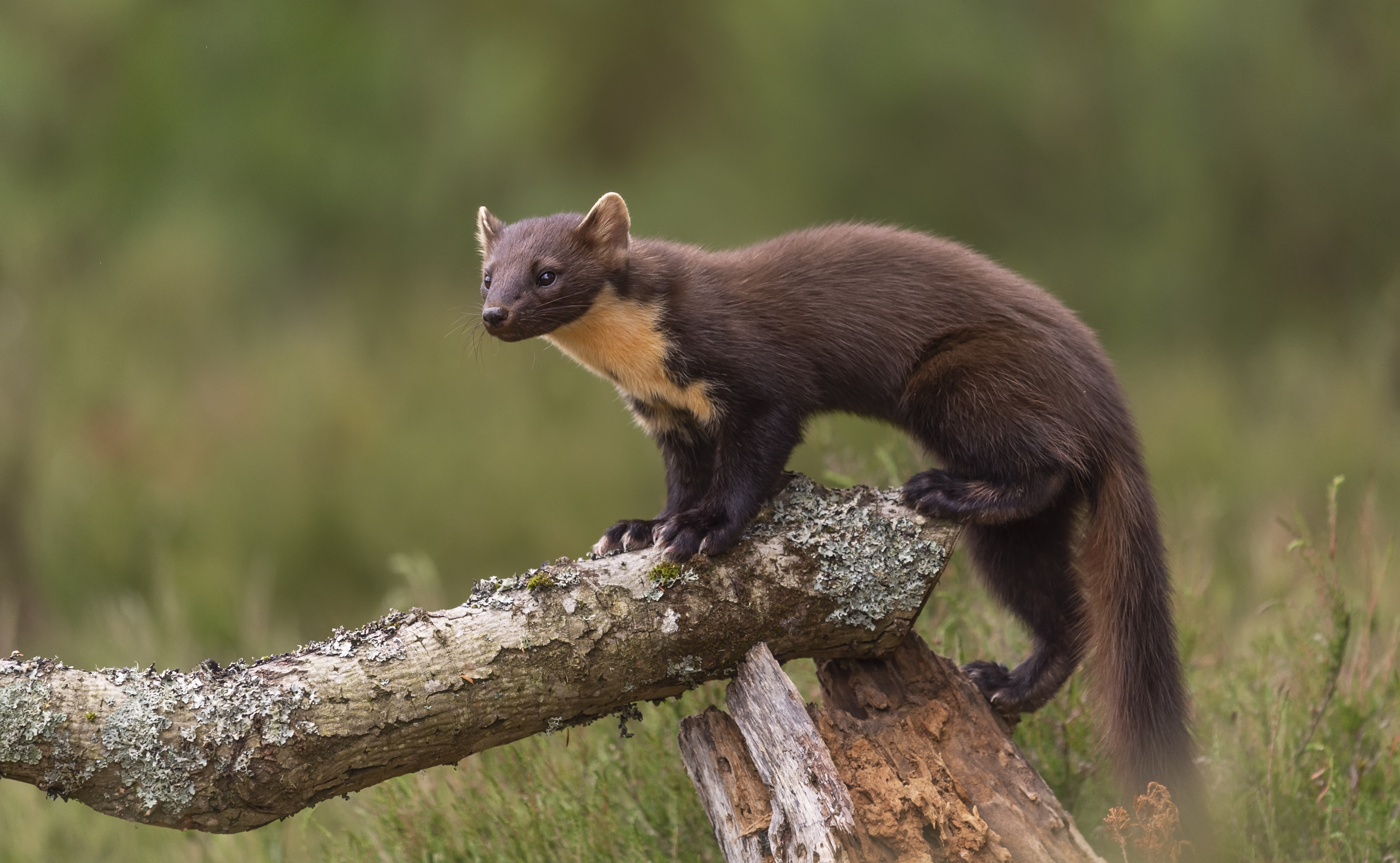

Conservation status
- Least Concern (IUCN 3.1)

Scientific classification
- Kingdom: Animalia
- Phylum: Chordata
- Class: Mammalia
- Order: Carnivora
- Family: Mustelidae
- Genus: Martes
- Species: M. martes

Binomial name
- Martes martes (Linnaeus, 1758)
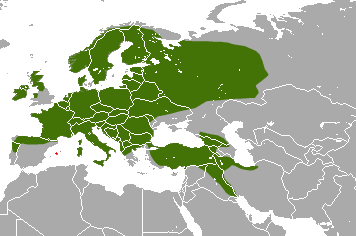
- European pine marten range (green – native, red – introduced)

Synonyms
- Mustela martes Linnaeus, 1758

= European pine marten =

Species of mammal in the mustelid family

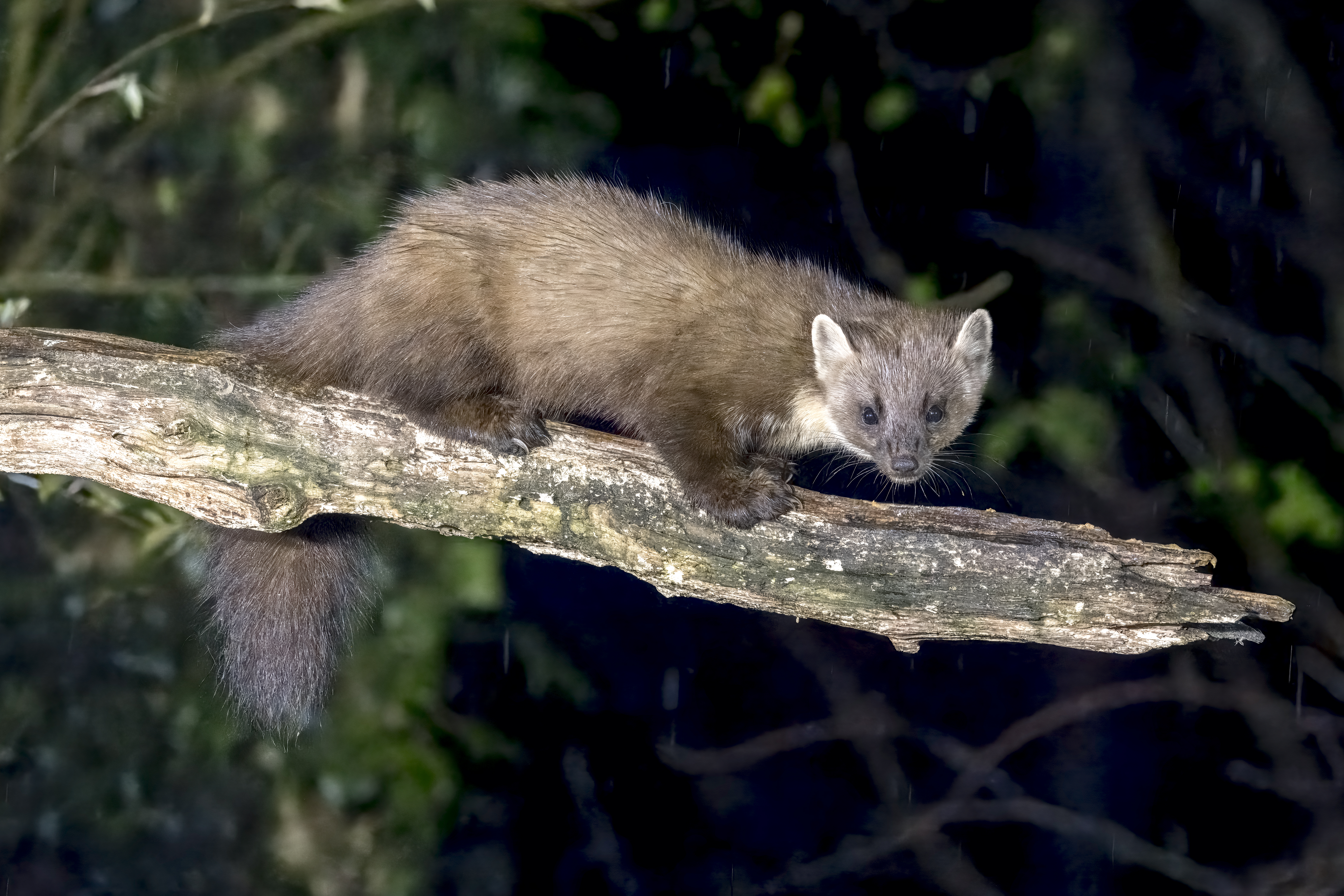
in the Netherlands

The European pine marten (Martes martes), also known as the pine marten, is a mustelid native to and widespread in most of Europe, Asia Minor, the Caucasus, and parts of Iran, Iraq, and Syria. It is listed as Least Concern on the IUCN Red List. It is less commonly known as baum marten or sweet marten.

== Description ==
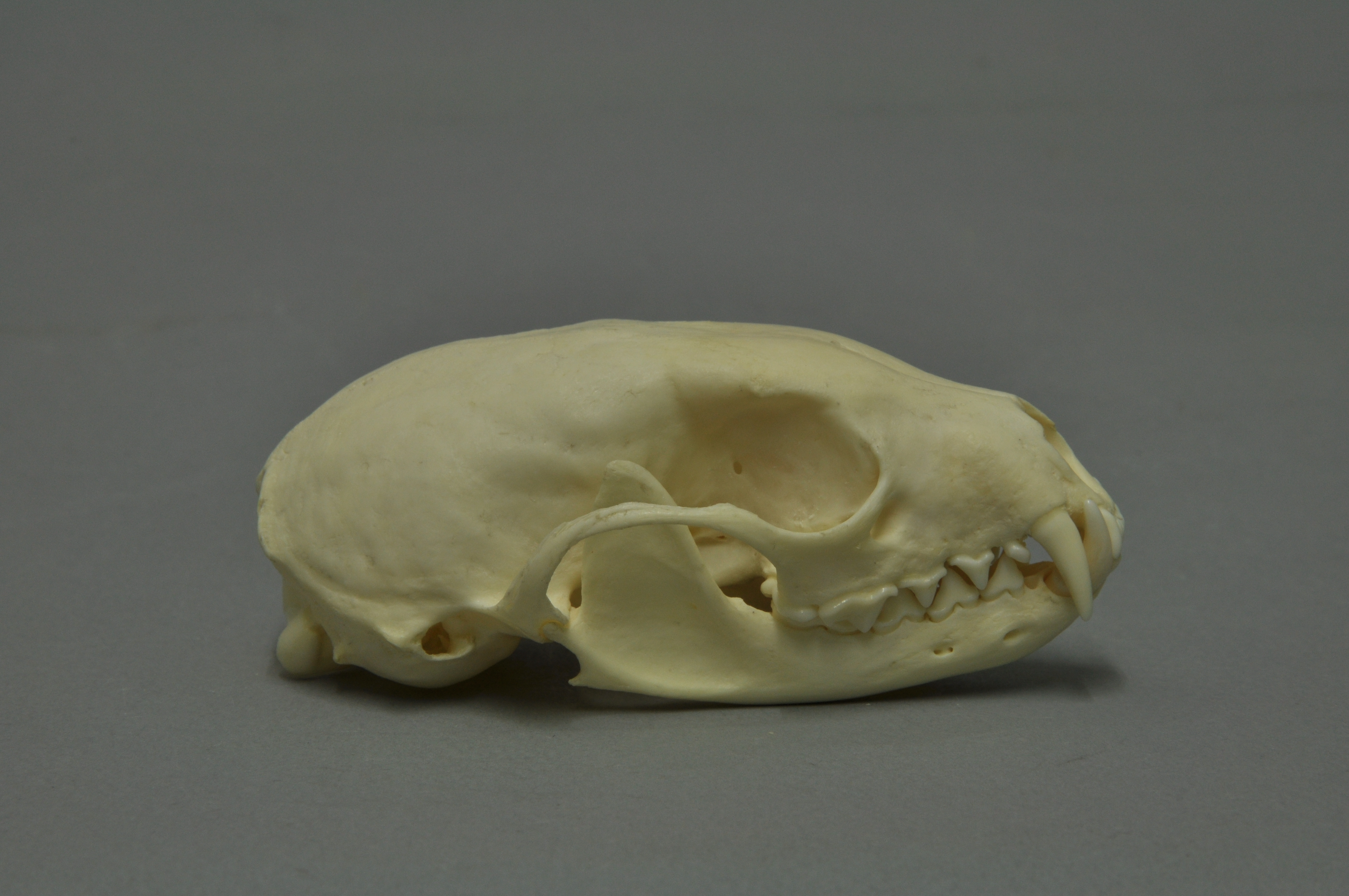
Skull of a European pine marten

The European pine marten's fur is usually light to dark brown. It is short and coarse in the summer, growing longer and silkier during the winter. It has a cream- to yellow-coloured "bib" marking on its throat. Its body is up to 53 cm (21 in) long, with a bushy tail of about 25 cm (9.8 in). It weighs around 1.5–1.7 kg (3.3–3.7 lb); males are slightly larger than females. It has excellent senses of sight, smell, and hearing.

== Distribution and habitat ==
=== United Kingdom ===
The European pine marten was for many years common only in northwestern Scotland. A study in 2012 found that it has spread from the Scottish Highlands north into Sutherland and Caithness and southeastwards from the Great Glen into Moray, Aberdeenshire, Perthshire, Tayside, and Stirlingshire, with some in the Central Belt, on the Kintyre and Cowal peninsulas, and on the islands of Skye and Mull. The expansion in the Galloway Forest has been limited compared with that in the core marten range. Martens were reintroduced to the Glen Trool Forest in the early 1980s and only restricted spread has occurred from there.

In England, the European pine marten was considered to be extinct. Analysis of a scat found at Kidland Forest in Northumberland in June 2010 may represent either a recolonisation from Scotland, or a relict population that has escaped notice previously. There have been numerous reported sightings of European pine martens in Cumbria over the years; however, only in 2011 was scat found and DNA-tested, followed in October 2022 by images of a European pine marten in Grizedale Forest.

In July 2015, the first confirmed sighting of a European pine marten in England for over a century was recorded by an amateur photographer in the woodlands of Shropshire. Sightings have continued in the area and juveniles were recorded in 2019, indicating a breeding population. In July 2017, footage of a live European pine marten was captured by a camera trap in the North York Moors in Yorkshire; in March 2018, the first ever footage of a European pine marten in Northumberland was captured by the Back from the Brink pine marten project.

The European pine marten's presence in Southern England's New Forest was confirmed in 2021, and they are now breeding there. In September 2022, the first European pine marten to be seen in London in a century was spotted by the Zoological Society of London's wildlife cameras as part of a hedgehog monitoring program. The Kent Wildlife Trust in collaboration with the Sussex Wildlife Trust announced a project in February 2024 to assess the feasibility of reintroducing European pine martens to South East England.

There is a small population of the European pine marten in Wales. Scat found in Cwm Rheidol forest in 2007 was confirmed by DNA testing to be from a European pine marten. A male was found in 2012 as road kill near Newtown, Powys. This was the first confirmation in Wales of the species, living or dead, since 1971. The Vincent Wildlife Trust (VWT) has begun a reinforcement of these mammals in the mid-Wales area. During autumn 2015, 20 European pine martens were captured in Scotland, in areas where a healthy European pine marten population occurs, under licence from Scottish Natural Heritage. These individuals were translocated and released in an area of mid-Wales. All of the martens were fitted with radio collars and are being tracked daily to monitor their movements and find out where they have set up territories. During autumn 2016, the VWT planned to capture and release another 20 European pine martens in the hope of creating a self-sustaining population. Following the success of these projects, 35 European pine martens were reintroduced between 2019 and 2021 to the Forest of Dean in South West England where they were last seen in 1860, with the hope that in time they will merge with the growing population in Wales to form a contiguous presence. After successful breeding every year, by 2023 their numbers were estimated to be approaching 60. In 2024, Devon Wildlife Trust began reintroducing European pine martens onto Dartmoor and Exmoor after centuries of absence.

=== Ireland ===
The European pine marten is still quite rare on the island of Ireland, but the population is recovering and spreading. Its traditional strongholds are in the west and south, especially the Burren and Killarney National Park, but the population in the Midlands has significantly increased in recent years. The predation of eastern grey squirrels by European pine martens has been beneficial for the population of the native red squirrel.

== Behaviour and ecology ==
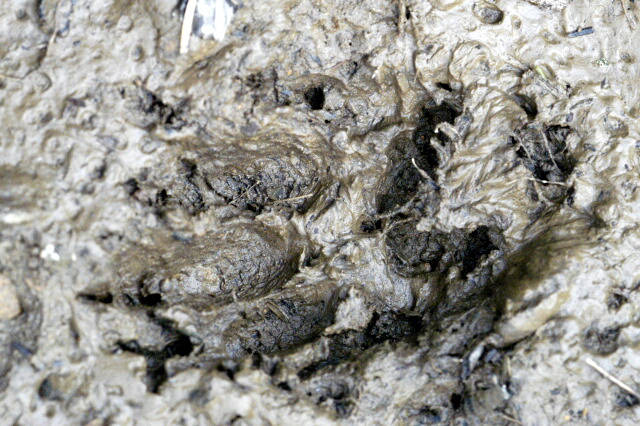
Tracks on mud

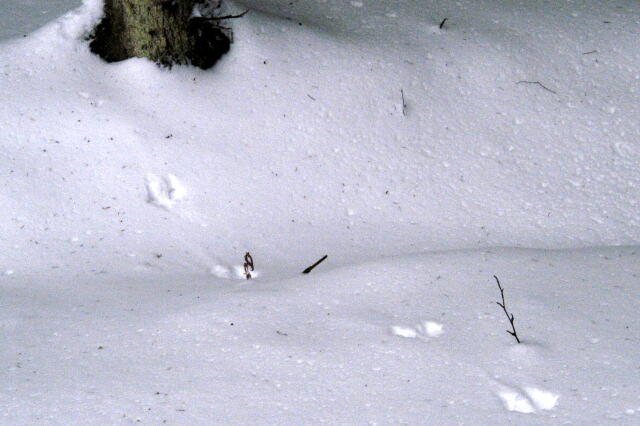
Tracks in snow

The European pine marten is the only mustelid with semiretractable claws. This enables them to lead more arboreal lifestyles, such as climbing or running on tree branches, although they are also relatively quick runners on the ground. They are mainly active at night and dusk. They have small, rounded, highly sensitive ears and sharp teeth adapted for eating small mammals, birds, insects, frogs, and carrion. They have also been known to eat berries, fruits, birds' eggs, nuts, and honey. The European pine marten is territorial and marks its home range by depositing feces. Its scat is black and twisted.

The recovery of the European pine marten in Ireland has been credited with reducing the population of invasive grey squirrels. Where the range of the expanding European pine marten population meets that of the grey squirrel, the population of the grey squirrels quickly retreats and the red squirrel population recovers. Because the grey squirrel spends more time on the ground than the red squirrel, which co-evolved with the pine marten, they are thought to be far more likely to come in contact with this predator.

=== Lifespan ===
The European pine marten has lived to 18 years in captivity, but the maximum age recorded in the wild is only 11 years, with 3–4 years being more typical. They reach sexual maturity at 2–3 years of age. Copulation usually occurs on the ground and can last more than an hour. Mating occurs in July and August, but the fertilized egg does not enter the uterus for about 7 months. The young are usually born in late March or early April, in litters of one to five, after a month-long gestation period that happens after the implantation of the fertilized egg. Young European pine martens weigh around 30 g (1.1 oz) at birth. The young begin to emerge from their dens around 7–8 weeks after birth and are able to disperse from the den around 12–16 weeks after their birth.

=== Predators ===
Larger mammalian predators and birds of prey, such as Eurasian lynx, wolverine, red fox, golden eagle, Eurasian eagle-owl, Eurasian goshawk and white-tailed eagle, prey on European pine martens, especially young individuals.

== Threats ==
Humans are the greatest threat to the European pine marten. They are vulnerable to conflict with humans arising from predator control for other species, or following predation of livestock and the use of inhabited buildings for denning. Martens may also be affected by woodland loss, which results in habitat loss for the animal. Persecution (illegal poisoning and shooting), loss of habitat leading to fragmentation, and other human disturbances have caused a considerable decline in the European pine marten population. In some areas, they are also prized for their very fine fur. In the UK, European pine martens and their dens are offered full protection under the Wildlife and Countryside Act 1981 and the Environmental Protection Act 1990.

== In culture ==
The European pine marten is one of the national symbols of Croatia and appears on the Croatian euro coins. Previously, the European pine marten appeared on the obverse side of the 1-, 2-, 5-, and 25-Croatian kuna, the word "kuna" meaning "marten" in Croatian.

== See also ==
- Marturina
