= Oregon Bridge Delivery Partners =

Oregon Bridge Delivery Partners (OBDP), a joint venture of HDR Engineering and Fluor Enterprises, is an engineering and project management company in the U.S. state of Oregon. The company is under contract to the Oregon Department of Transportation (ODOT) and its Highway Division to manage projects in the Oregon Transportation Investment Act III State Bridge Delivery Program, under which hundreds of bridges in Oregon will be repaired or replaced.
