= Coca-Cola Place =

Commercial office tower in North Sydney, Australia

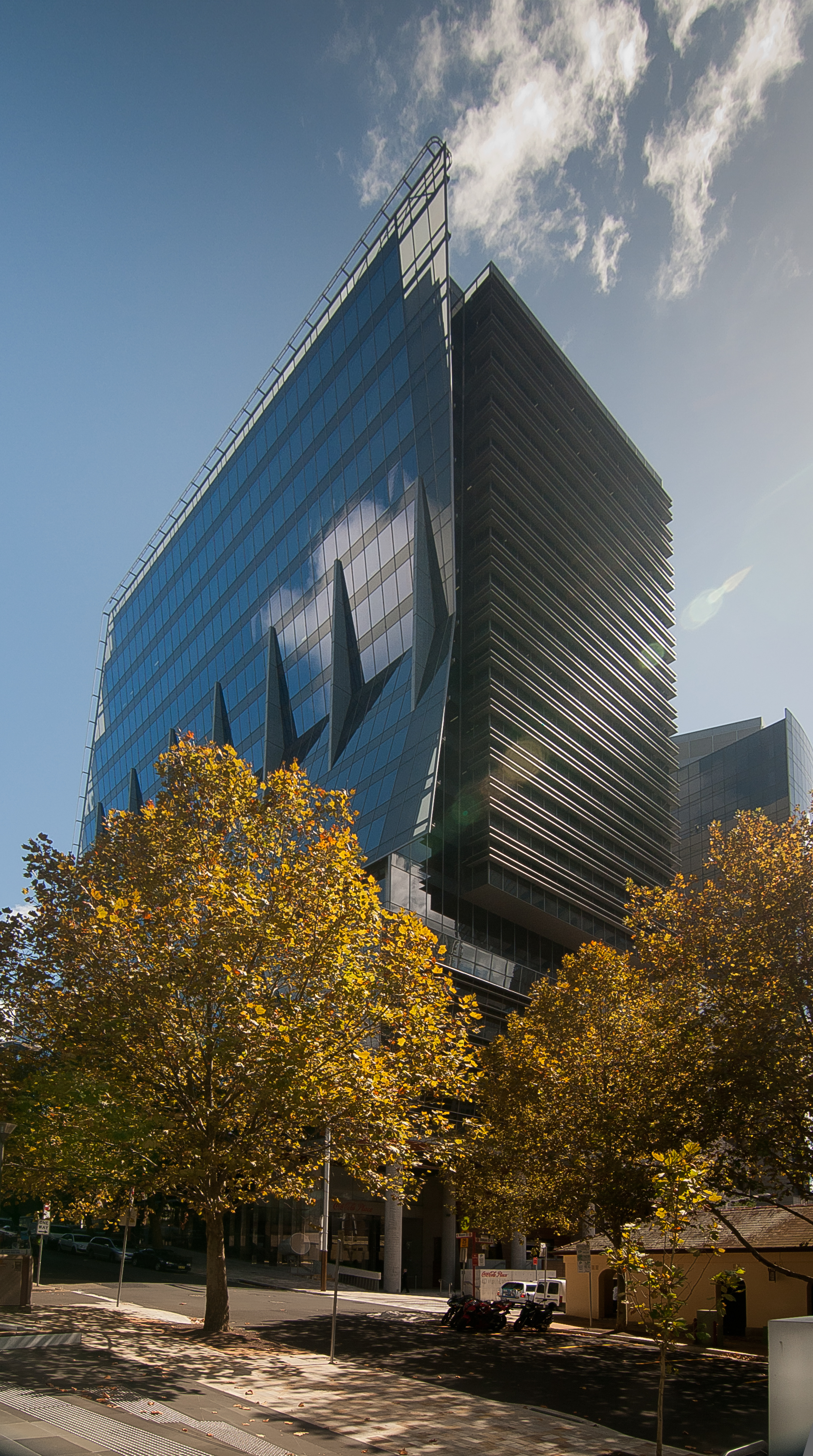
- View from Mount Street
- Interactive map of the Coca-Cola Place area
- Alternative names: The Ark

General information
- Type: Commercial Office Tower
- Location: North Sydney, Australia
- Coordinates: 33°50′18.30″S 151°12′20.14″E
- Completed: 2010
- Cost: A$230 million
- Owner: Investa

Technical details
- Floor count: 21
- Floor area: 28 500 m2

Design and construction
- Architect: Rice Daubney
- Structural engineer: Taylor Thompson Whitting
- Other designers: Cundall Johnston & Partners (ESD Consultant)
- Main contractor: Leighton Contractors

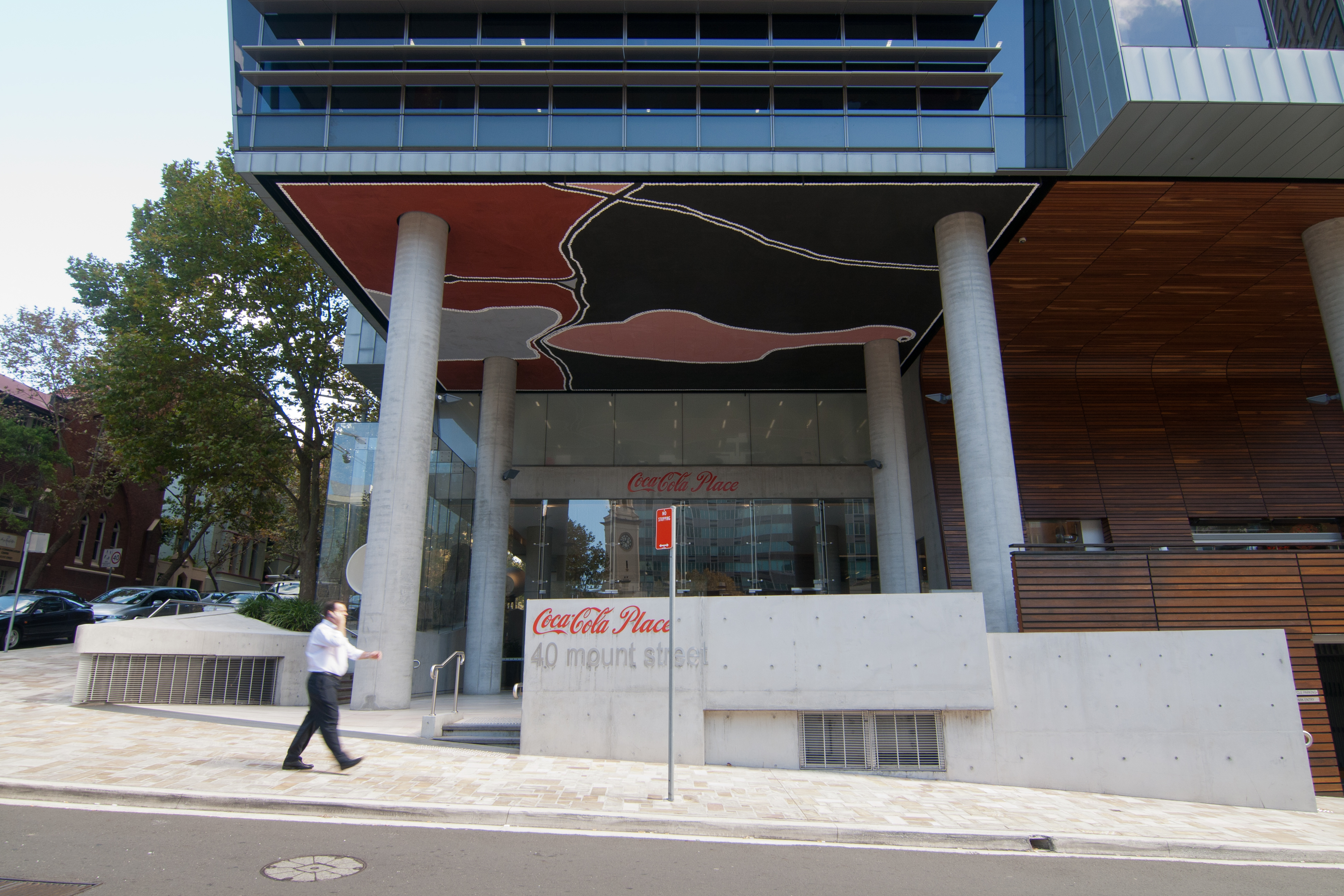
Main Entrance on corner of William & Mount Streets

Coca-Cola Place, originally known as The Ark, is a 21 level commercial office building located at 16-40 Mount St in North Sydney, Australia. It is jointly owned by Investa Property Group and Investa Commercial Property Fund and was designed by Rice Daubney. Major tenants include Coca-Cola Europacific Partners Gartner, McAfee and ARN Media.

The building has won a series of awards since completion in 2010 and has also received a 6-Star Green Star accreditation.

== Site and Building History ==
Coca-Cola Place is built on the site of the former North Sydney telephone exchange. A previous developer had intended the site for a boutique hotel but was bankrupted before development began. Rice Daubney, who had been speculatively assessing the suitability of a variety of North Sydney properties for development recommended the site at 16-40 Mount Street to Investa in 2006 after changes to North Sydney Council’s planning controls allowed an increase in floor space ratio on the site.

In order to gain council consent for the removal of the heritage listed telephone exchange building the developer made commitments to provide public space (a pocket park and forecourt), to ensure a three metre set back from the street and to incorporate public art into the building design.

Construction began in late 2007 and with Coca-Cola Amatil occupying in early in 2010. The estimated cost of the redevelopment of the site was $230 million.

== Architecture and Design ==
Coca-Cola Place was designed by Rice Daubney. Though the building employs a classic podium and tower design the tilted facades, modest proportions and the open public forecourt at the entrance soften the transitions from ground to podium and from podium to tower while simultaneously giving the building its distinctive form.

Writing in INDESIGN magazine Angela Ferguson described Coca-Cola Place as ‘the best thing to happen to North Sydney, architecturally speaking, in a long time’. The Property Council’s NSW Executive Director, Glenn Byres has said that Coca-Cola Place ‘is what design excellence is all about - it is daring, iconic and a true landmark for Sydney’

The building has side-core floorplates with the elevator shafts and structural cores located on the North side of the building which abuts the adjacent development in the lower floors. The southern facade is almost entirely glazed allowing full views of Sydney Harbour, including the Sydney Opera House and the Sydney Harbour Bridge, as well as the CBD.

A restrained palette of materials has been used including off form concrete, recycled timber, steel and glazing. Rice Daubney’s Director of Design for the Project Paul Reidy has remarked that paint was not used as it ‘dematerialises the building’.

In addition to the public artworks other elements of the former telephone exchange building were also incorporated into the architectural design of the building. Signage board, recycled from the exchange, was used as a strip detail in the elevator lobby.

In late 2009, during construction of Coca-Cola Place, an unusual dust-storm struck Sydney and caused one alarmed North Sydney resident to call police and report that the building was falling into the street. When police arrived the builders assured them that the building facade was intended to look as it did but the police insisted on accessing the site and building documentation to verify all was as it should be.

Coca-Cola Place was the first commercial high-rise in Australia to be designed and built with the use of building information modelling.

== Environmental Performance ==
Coca-Cola Place was the first high rise commercial building in NSW to receive the Green Building Council of Australia’s 6-Star Green Star as built V2 certification.

A variety of passive systems, such as appropriate orientation of inhabited spaces, daylight maximisation and facade screening, have been used in conjunction with active systems such as energy efficient lighting, water efficient fittings, rainwater collection and greywater recycling. The building also utilises tri-generation power for electricity, cooling and hot water heating.

Coca-Cola Amatil’s interior fitout was awarded a 5 Star Green Star rating for Office Interiors V1.1.

== Public Artworks ==
In order to satisfy a commitment to North Sydney Council for the provision of public art three artworks were commissioned for the development. A gigantic and distinctively Aboriginal painting by Freddie Tims dominates the forecourt and main entrance to the building. The work depicts Lissadell Station where Tims spent much of his early life. The main foyer is home to the collaborative work of sculptor Hany Armanious and Mary Teague as well as a shadow sculpture of metal letters by one of Rice Daubney’s Project Architects and Model-maker Simon Grimes. The Armanious/Teague work is entitled ‘Lines of Communication’ and, like Grimes’ work, uses materials retained from the demolition of the site’s former telephone exchange.

== Awards ==
The Ark has won 7 significant awards since the projects completion in 2010.

- 2011 - Rider Levett Bucknall Innovation and Excellence Awards - NSW Development of the Year
- 2011 - Rider Levett Bucknall Innovation and Excellence Awards - Best New Sustainable Development
- 2011 - AIA NSW Awards Commercial Building Commendation for Outstanding Architecture
- 2010 - Urban Taskforce Development Excellence Award - Development of the Year
- 2010 - NSW Excellence in Property Award (The Australian Property Industry) - The Environmental Development Award
- 2010 - New South Wales Excellence in Building and Construction Awards (Master Builder's Association) - Best Use of Glass
- 2010 - New South Wales Excellence in Building and Construction Awards (Master Builder's Association) - Energy Efficiency

== See also ==
- North Sydney, New South Wales
- Coca-Cola
