= Pedro Madueño =

Spanish photographer

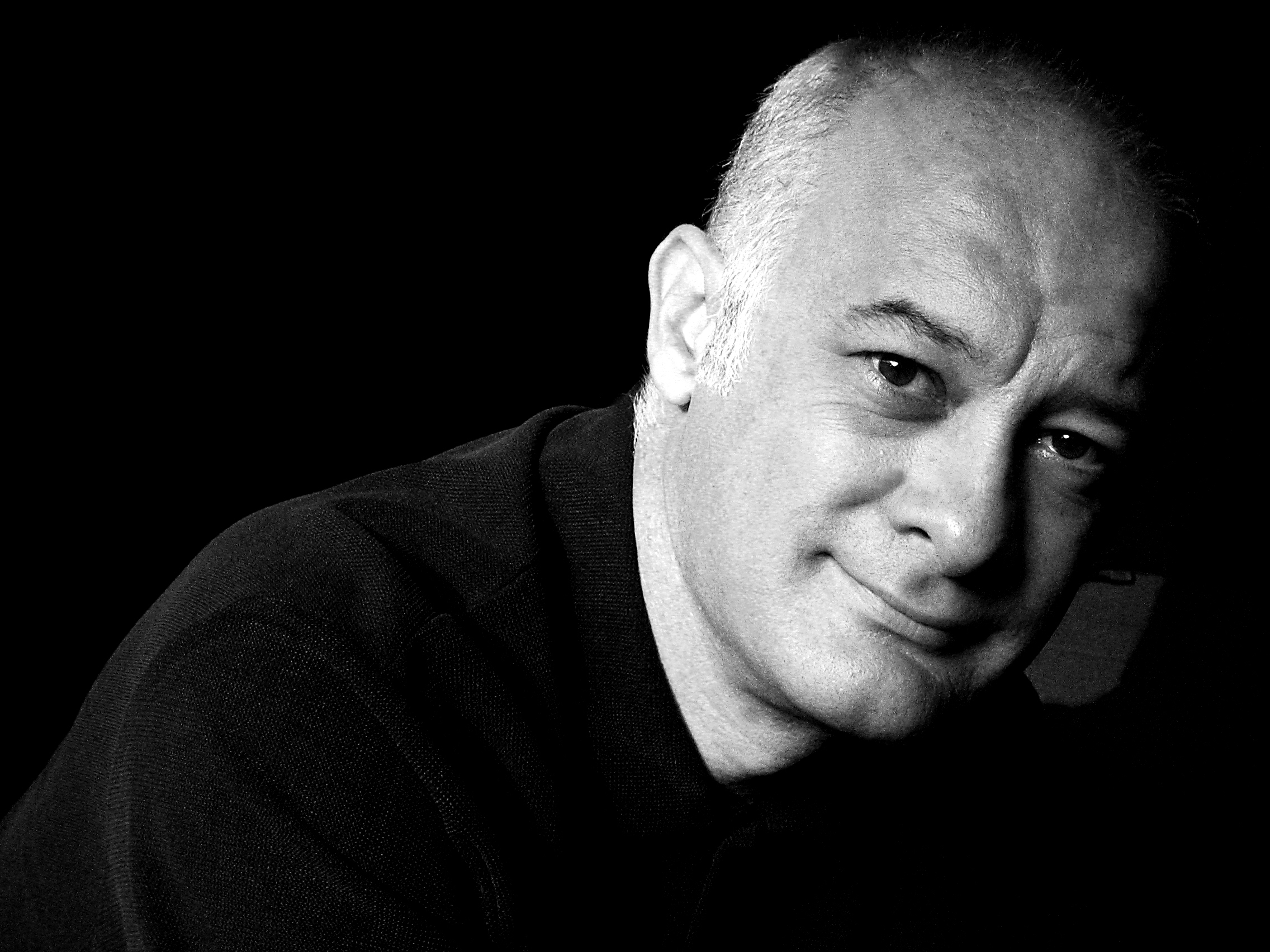
Pedro Madueño in 2007.

Pedro Madueño Palma (born 1961 in La Carlota, Córdoba) is a Spanish photographer. He worked as a graphic reporter for the newspaper La Vanguardia in Barcelona from 1983 to 2015. In 2015 he was appointed Deputy Director of La Vanguardia with responsibility for the image area of the newspaper. He was an associate professor at Pompeu Fabra University and since 2008 he has taught graduate students at the Autonomous University of Barcelona. He is the author of the official image of Prince Felipe de Borbón y Grecia from 2002 until 2010. In 2010 he authored the official image of President of the Government of Catalonia Artur Mas. He photographed Salvador Dalí during the last three years of the artist's life.

His career as a photographer started in 1975. His mentors were Juan Guerrero and Eugeni Madueño. He first published when he was only fifteen years old. He has contributed to Barcelonan newspapers including Tele/exprés, Mundo Diario, El Noticiero Universal, El Periódico de Catalunya and Diario de Barcelona. He created what has become known as the "photo of consensus", now an established tradition in the Catalan press. Since 1984, on the eve of elections in Catalonia, Madueño and La Vanguardia have managed to join candidates from all political parties for a group photo.

== Bibliography ==
- 1990 Barcelona-90. In collaboration with Matías Briansó, Paco Elvira, Pepe Encinas, Antonio Espejo and Avelino Pi. Lunwerg publishers, Barcelona.
- 1995 Barcelona Retrat(s). Text by Eugeni Madueño. FAVB (Federació d’Associacions de Veïns de Barcelona).
- 2006 Barcelona a vista de pájaro. Foreword by Quim Monzó . Text by Tate Cabré, Eugeni Casanova and Jordi Rovira. La Vanguardia Publishing house.
- 2010 Monzó- How to succeed in life. Julià Guillamón (ed.) Galàxia Gutenberg – Cercle de Lectors Publishing house.
- 2010 Cultura. Generalitat de Catalunya. Department of Culture and Mass Media.
- 2011 Gestos. Crònica fotogràfica. Tres dècadas rere el president Jordi Pujol. Sol90 Publishing house.
- 2012 Matador. Magazine cover. Portrait of Ferran Adrià. La Fábrica books. ISSN 1135-1772 - D.L: M-13686-1995
- 2012 Pedro Madueño. Retrats periodístics. 1977-2012. Catalogue exhibition. Author: Julià Guillamon. Edited by "la Caixa" Foundation. ISBN 978-84-9900-059-6 DL: B-6418-2012
- 2012 Pedro Madueño. Seqüències. Exhibition catalogue. Texts of Juan José Caballero. Can Framis. Barcelona. Edited by Vila Casas Foundation. D.L. B-14237-2012-ISBN 978-84-615-7719-4
- 2013 Agua, aguas. Félix de Azua, Patricio Court, Albert Espinosa, Marcos Giralt, Pedro Madueño, Din Matamoro, Pepe Moll, Quim Monzó, Nicanor Parra, M. Luisa Rojo, A. Sánchez Robayna, Suso de Toro. Edited by Agbar Foundation. Barcelona. D.L. B-8341-2013
- 2015 Five minutes. Pedro Madueño. Journalistic portraits. Edited by Valid editions. ISBN 978-84-938868-2-0- Legal Deposit: B 6369–2015.

== Awards ==
- 1985 First prize Fotopres in Portrait category. La Caixa Foundation.
- 1988 First prize Fotopres in Nature category. La Caixa Foundation.
- 1988 Second prize Fotopres in Portrait category. La Caixa Foundation.
- 1990 Third prize Fotopres in Portrait category. La Caixa Foundation.
- 1991 Third prize Fotopres in Portrait category. La Caixa Foundation.
- 1991 Second prize Fotopres in Snapshot category. La Caixa Foundation.
- 1993 First prize Fotopres in Portrait category. La Caixa Foundation.
- 1993 First prize Benestar Social. Barcelona City Council.
- 1993 Golden Laus in photography. ADG-FAD.
- 1994 Award of Excellence Society of Newspaper Design.
- 1996 Godó photojournalism prize. Fundación Conde de Barcelona.
- 2011 Vila Casas first prize photography. Work "Ággelos" Vila Casas Foundation.

== Exhibitions ==
- 1994 Urban Portraits. Sala Arcs. Photographic Spring. Barcelona.
- 1997 Face to face. Can Sisteré. Santa Coloma de Gramenet. Barcelona.
- 2000 Collective Exhibition History of the photography in Catalonia. National Museum of Art of Catalonia (MNAC). Barcelona.
- 2000 Collective Exhibition History of the Photography in Catalonia. Civic museum di Monza. Monza-Brianza. Italy.
- 2009 Collaborated in the exhibition Monzó – How to succeed in life in the Centre d'Arts Santa Mònica of Barcelona. Exhibition organised by the Department of Culture and Media of Generalitat de Catalunya and la Institució de les Lletres Catalanes.
- 2012 Pedro Madueño. Retrats periodístics.1977-2012. Retrospective exhibition. CaixaForum Barcelona. Commissary Julià Guillamon.
- 2012 Exhibition. Seqüències. Commissioner: Juan José Caballero. Museum Can Framis. Vila Casas Foundation. Barcelona.
- 2013 Collective exhibition. Agua, aguas. Commissioner Andrés Sánchez Robayna. The Museu Agbar de les Aigües. Cornellà. Barcelona
- 2014 Collective exhibition A cop d’ull. Curated by Alex Brahim and Manuel Segade. The Virreina Palace. Barcelona.
- 2015 Collective exhibition Not Yet. On the Reinvention of Documentary and the Critique of Modernism". Curated by Jorge Ribalta. Museo Nacional Centro de Arte Reina Sofía.
- 2015 Pedro Madueño. Journalistic Portraits.1977-2015. Exhibition at CaixaForum Palma de Mallorca. Curated by Julia Guillamon.
- 2015 Pedro Madueño. Journalistic Portraits.1977-2015. Exhibition at CaixaForum Madrid. Curated by Julia Guillamon.

== Work ==
- 2000 Martí i Pol – 1994. Hubert de Wangen collection – Kowasa. Barcelona
- 2004 Henri Cartier-Bresson – 2003. Hubert de Wangen collection – Kowasa. Barcelona
- 2010 Creative Hand – 2008. Antoni Tàpies. Documentary fund of the Museo Nacional Centro de Arte Reina Sofía. Madrid
- 2010 José Tomás – 2009. Series of six photographs. Art collection of the Vila Casas Foundation. Barcelona
- 2014 Aggelos – 2011. Art collection. Vila Casas Foundation
- 2014 Ocrus – 2014. Art collection. Vila Casas Foundation
