= Paradise Beverages =

Alcoholic beverage producer in Fiji

Paradise Beverages (Fiji) Limited
- Predecessor: Carlton Brewery Fiji Limited; Fosters Group Pacific Limited
- Founded: August 1957; 69 years ago in Suva, Fiji
- Headquarters: Suva, Fiji
- Area served: Fiji, Samoa
- Key people: Betty Ivanoff (chairperson); Michael Spencer (general manager)
- Products: Fiji Bitter, Fiji Gold, Fiji Gold Moli; Fiji Premium; Export, Vonu Pure Lager
- Number of employees: 192
- Parent: Coca-Cola Amatil
- Website: www.paradisebeverages.com.fj

Paradise Beverages (Fiji) Limited is a Fijian alcoholic beverage producer based in Suva. It is a publicly listed company on the South Pacific Stock Exchange.

Paradise Beverages was established in August 1957 in Suva, following a partnership between Carlton and United Breweries and Carpenters Fiji Limited, the company was incorporated as Carlton Brewery Fiji Limited (CBFL) in November.

The company's commenced production of its first beer, Fiji Bitter, twelve months later in November 1958, following the official opening of the Carlton Brewery in Walu Bay, Suva. The brewery’s first keg of locally-brewed draught beer going on sale in January 1959. In 1972 CBFL made 14% of the company available to public shareholders. In 1977 the company purchased the South Seas Brewery, which was based in Lautoka. The South Seas Brewery was constructed in 1972 by majority shareholder, New Zealand Breweries, but closed due to bankruptcy in March 1975. The company releasing Fiji Light and Fiji Stout, replacing them in 1995 with Fiji Gold.

In 1998 it acquired the South Pacific Distillery from Fiji Sugar Corporation, the only commercial distillery in the South Pacific region at that time.

In July 1999 CBFL purchased Samoa Breweries Limited in Apia, the producer of Vailima beers and Samoan bottler of Coca-Cola. In 2000 Carlton and United held a majority 63% stake in the company, Fijian Holdings Limited (a Fijian investment company owned by the provinces of Fiji) held 30%, purchased in 1995, and the remaining 7% was owned by a number of local interests. In May 2005, CBFL merged with South Pacific Distilleries to form Fosters Group Pacific Limited (FGPL), which two months later was listed on the South Pacific Stock Exchange. Fijian Holdings Limited retaining a 28.9% share in the new company. In 2007 FGPL launched Fiji Premium.

In September 2012 following the global takeover of Fosters Group by multi-national brewer, SABMiller, the company was sold to Australian-listed company Coca-Cola Amatil for FJ$91 million, and renamed Paradise Beverages Fiji Limited (PBFL). Coca-Cola Amatil currently holds a controlling 89.59% stake in the company.

In March 2014 PBFL acquired the Island Brewing Company in Nadi. The Island Brewing Company was established in 2009 by New Zealand brothers Jeremy and Jonathan Ullrich. It commenced operations as a boutique micro-brewery, producing Taki Premium Lager and Vonu Pure Lager.

In 2015 PBFL commenced upgrading its facilities, spending over FJ$45 million over three years, doubling production capacity, and constructing a state-of-the-art packaging facility. In February 2019 the company launched the Fiji Gold Moli, a version of their best selling beer with a lemon flavour.

== See also ==
- Beer in Fiji
- Samoa Breweries
- List of companies of Fiji
