= Rice Daubney =

Former architectural agency in Australia

Practice information
- Founders: Kevin Rice; John Daubney
- Founded: 1976
- Dissolved: 16 June 2017
- No. of employees: 120 (October 2013)
- Location: Sydney

Significant works and honors
- Buildings: Renovation of the Queen Victoria Building; Coca-Cola Place; Zenith Centre

Website
- www.ricedaubney.com.au

Rice Daubney was a Sydney based architectural practice with over 120 staff. It was established in 1976 by Kevin Rice and John Daubney, both formerly of Fombertaux Rice Hanly. The practice's head office was located at 110 Walker Street in North Sydney, a building that was designed by Rice Daubney in the late 1980s. In October 2013 the firm was acquired by HDR with the brand retired in June 2017.

The firm's work covered most sectors of the architectural design industry with a strong emphasis on the use of Building Information Modelling (BIM) and sustainable design practices in building. Rice Daubney pioneered the use of a new glazing system for multi-storey buildings and foresaw a shift away from high-rise office towers to lower-scale, more personalised buildings.

== History ==
In 1976 Kevin Rice left the firm Fombertaux Rice Hanly where he had been managing director and with another former employee of Fombertaux Rice Hanly, John Daubney jointly established Rice Daubney. Early projects that helped establish the firms reputation include the Queen Victoria Building renovation/restoration (completed 1986) and the Zenith Centre in Chatswood (completed 1987). Additional offices were opened in Jakarta in late 1987 and Brisbane in 2004.

When Kevin Rice retired in 1990, John Daubney took over as managing director.

In October 2013 Rice Daubney was purchased by HDR. In June 2017 the Rice Daubney brand was retired.

== Notable projects ==
Rice Daubney designed some of Australia's landmark buildings including the following major architectural projects:

Completed	Project name	Location	Award	Notes
1986	Queen Victoria Building renovation	Sydney central business district	RAIA (NSW) Sir John Sulman Medal for outstanding Architecture (1987)	
	Orion Town Centre	Springfield, Queensland	UDIA (Qld) State and presidents Award	
1987	Zenith Centre	Chatswood, Sydney		
1987	Erina Fair	Erina	RAIA Premier's Awards for Innovation in Design (2005)	
	Sunshine Coast University Hospital	Kawana Waters, Queensland		
	The Chris O'Brien Lifehouse at Royal Prince Alfred Hospital	Camperdown, Sydney		
	Nelune Comprehensive Cancer Centre and Australian Advanced Treatment Centre, Prince of Wales Hospital	Randwick, Sydney		
	Liverpool Hospital Clinical Services Block 2 (CSB2)	Liverpool, Sydney		
2007	Rouse Hill Town Centre	Rouse Hill, Sydney	RAIA Walter Burley Griffin Urban Design Award; RAIA (NSW) Lloyd Rees Award for Outstanding Urban Design (2008); Banksia People's Choice Award	
2010	Coca-Cola Place	North Sydney	Rider Levett Bucknall Innovation and Excellence Awards – NSW Development of the Year (2011); Rider Levett Bucknall Innovation and Excellence Awards – Best New Sustainable Development (2011); AIA NSW Awards Commercial Building Commendation for Outstanding Architecture (2011); Urban Taskforce Development Excellence Award – Development of the Year (2010); NSW Excellence in Property Award (The Australian Property Industry) – The Environmental Development Award (2010); New South Wales Excellence in Building and Construction Awards (Master Builder's Association) – Best Use of Glass (2010); New South Wales Excellence in Building and Construction Awards (Master Builder's Association) – Energy Efficiency (2010)	
	388 George Street	Sydney central business district		

== See also ==
- Architecture of Australia
