= Zenith Centre =

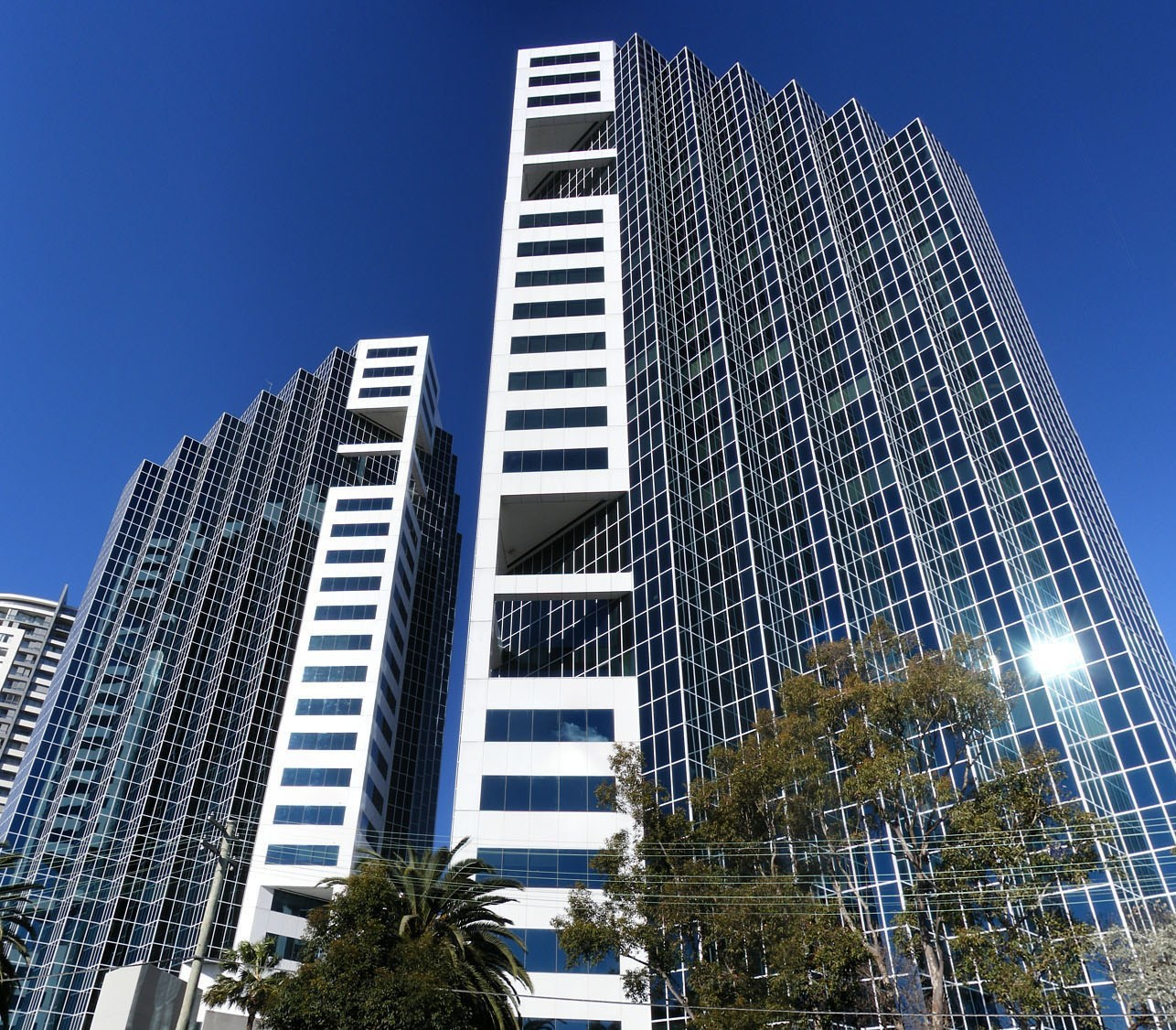
- The complex from the Pacific Highway

General information
- Type: Office
- Location: Chatswood
- Coordinates: 33°47′41″S 151°10′46″E
- Construction started: 1987
- Completed: 1990

Height
- Height: 94 metres (308 ft) (Tower A); 94 metres (308 ft) (Tower B)

Technical details
- Floor count: 24 (Tower A); 24 (Tower B)

Design and construction
- Architecture firm: Rice Daubney

The Zenith Centre is a high-rise office complex in Sydney, New South Wales, Australia designed by architectural firm Rice Daubney. It is located in the suburb of Chatswood, at the corner of Railway & McIntosh Streets. The Zenith Centre comprises two office towers totalling 43,750 m^{2} and offers an excellent standard of accommodation, having been developed in 1987 to a high A-grade specification. It has approximately 800 car spaces and large, efficient floor plates of over 1,000 m^{2}. It also houses a theater on the ground level.

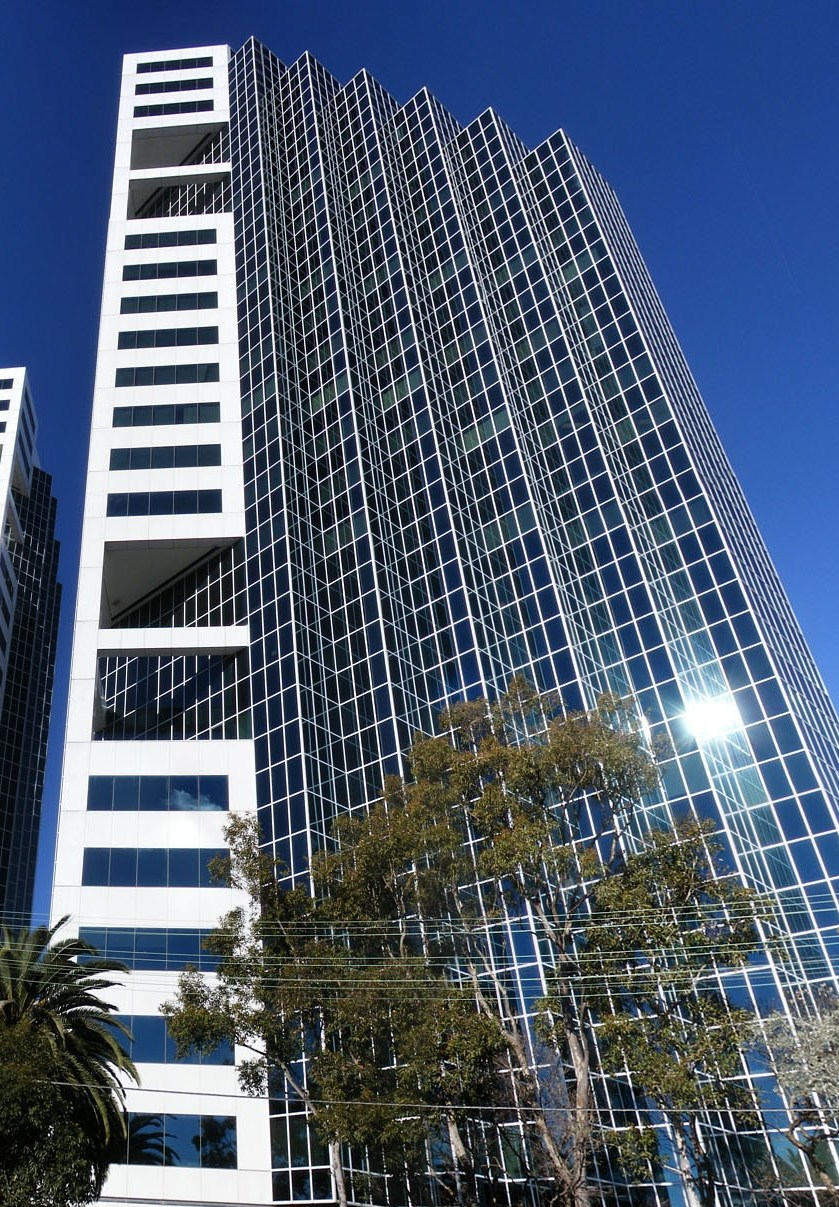
Tower A

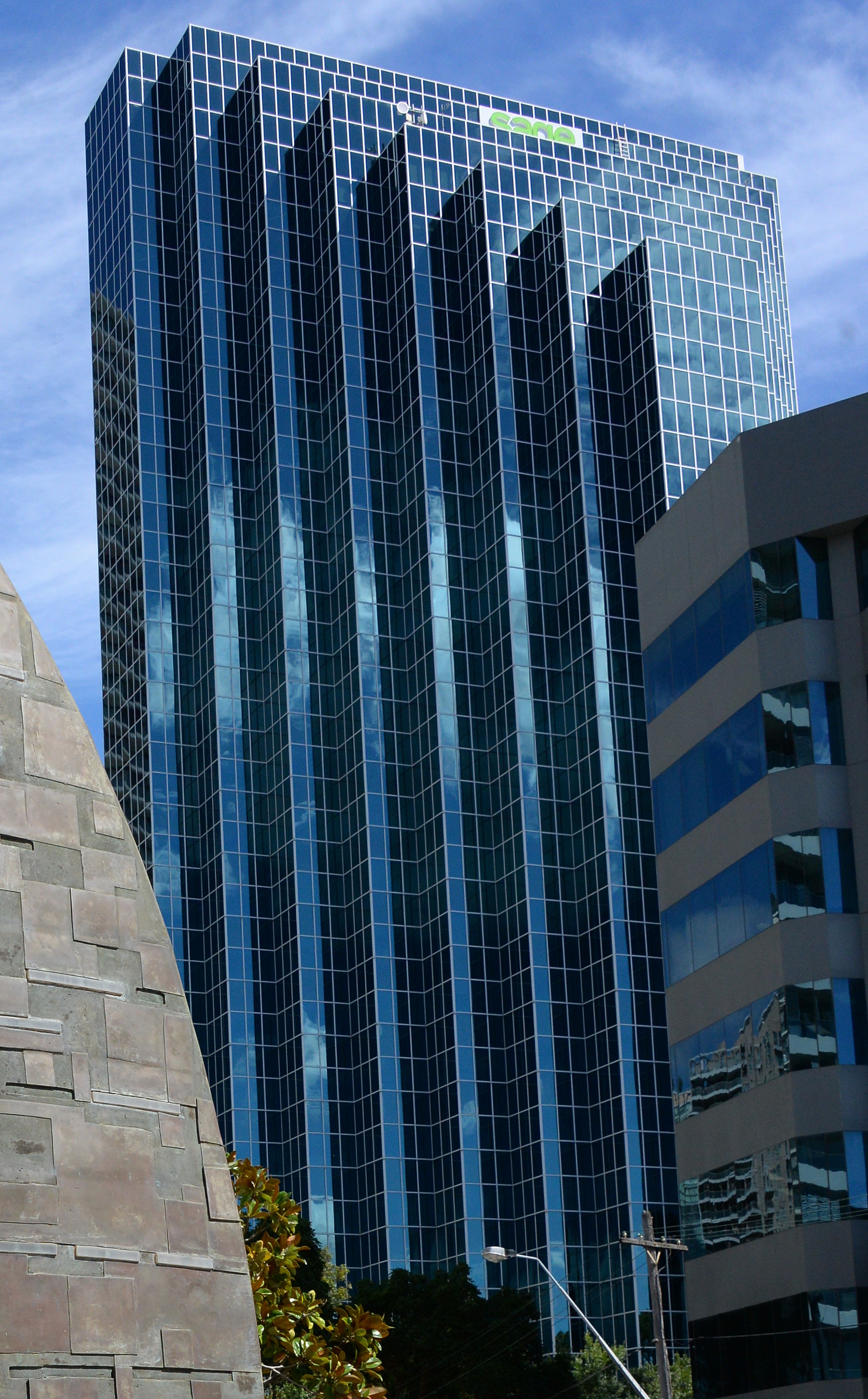
Tower B
