= Coca-Cola Enterprises =

Former Coca-Cola marketer, producer and distributor

Coca-Cola Enterprises, Inc.
- Industry: Beverages
- Founded: 1986
- Defunct: 28 May 2016
- Fate: merged with Coca-Cola Iberian Partners, S.A. and Coca-Cola Erfrischungsgetränke AG
- Successor: Coca-Cola European Partners
- Headquarters: Atlanta, Georgia, U.S.
- Key people: John F. Brock (Chairman & CEO); Manik Jhangiani (CFO); Hubert Patricot (President, Europe Group)
- Products: Coca-Cola brands Other soft drinks
- Revenue: ▲US$7.6 Billion (FY 2012)
- Operating income: ▲US$914 Million (FY 2013)
- Net income: ▲US$677 Million (FY 2012)
- Total assets: ▲US$9.09 Billion (FY 2011)
- Total equity: ▼US$2.90 Billion (FY 2011)
- Number of employees: 13,250 (2011)

Coca-Cola Enterprises was a marketer, producer, and distributor of Coca-Cola products. It was formerly the anchor bottler for Western Europe and most of North America.

Coca-Cola Enterprises' products included Coca-Cola, Diet Coke, Coke Zero, Sprite, Fanta, Capri-Sun, Dr Pepper, Chaudfontaine, Schweppes, Monster and Relentless.

== History ==
The Coca-Cola Company decided to consolidate the many independent bottling groups in the Coca-Cola System. Previously, independent businesses in remote geographic areas bottled Coca-Cola products and distributed the merchandise to stores.

In 1980, Coca-Cola acquired the Coca-Cola Bottling Company of New York for $215 million. In 1982, Coca-Cola acquired the Associated Coca-Cola Bottling Company for $417.5 million. In 1986, Coca-Cola acquired the bottling operations of Beatrice Foods and the bottling operations of the Lupton family. Coca-Cola Enterprises Inc. was spun off from The Coca-Cola Company in 1986.

After buying these bottlers, Coca-Cola spun this function off to anchor bottlers in various parts of the world. Coca-Cola Enterprises continued to acquire regional bottlers throughout the 1990s.

The company had its headquarters in Atlanta, Georgia and was a separate corporation from The Coca-Cola Company; both companies were listed on the New York Stock Exchange and were components of the S&P 500.

Similar anchor bottlers include the South Pacific area's Coca-Cola Amatil, Eastern Europe's Coca-Cola Hellenic, and Latin America's Coca-Cola FEMSA.

== Territories ==
Coca-Cola Enterprises was the exclusive Coca-Cola bottler for all of Belgium, continental France, Great Britain, Luxembourg, Monaco, The Netherlands, Norway and Sweden.

Some of its production facilities were located in Norway (Lørenskog), Sweden (Jordbro), The Netherlands (Dongen), Belgium (Antwerp, Ghent and Chaudfontaine (mineral water only)), France (Socx, Grigny, Clamart, Les Pennes-Mirabeau and Castanet-Tolosan), and the UK (Wakefield, Sidcup, Edmonton, Milton Keynes, East Kilbride and Morpeth).

== Electric trucks ==
When Coca-Cola Enterprises was the anchor bottler in North America, it had the largest fleet of hybrid electric trucks in North America. The hybrid electric tractor units were the standard bulk delivery truck the company uses for large deliveries. CCE planned to deploy 185 of these hybrid electric trucks across the United States and Canada in 2009, bringing its total number of hybrid electric delivery trucks to 327, the largest such fleet in North America. The company already had 142 smaller hybrid electric delivery vehicles on the road. The trucks were powered by Eaton Corporation's hybrid electric drivetrain systems.

== Sale of assets to The Coca-Cola Company ==
On February 24, 2010, The Coca-Cola Company and Coca-Cola Enterprises entered talks about selling CCE's North American division to Coca-Cola. Coca-Cola paid over $15 billion, including a redemption of Coca-Cola's 33% shareholding in CCE. Coca-Cola wanted the business in their asset list because they felt it would save both consumers and Coca-Cola money. Coca-Cola also spun off its small European bottling division to "New CCE".

The acquisition closed on October 3, 2010.

== Merger ==
On August 6, 2015, Coca-Cola Enterprises announced that it would merge with Coca-Cola Iberian Partners and Coca-Cola Erfrischungsgetränke AG, a subsidiary of the Coca-Cola Company, into a new company to be called Coca-Cola European Partners PLC.
