= John F. Brock =

American businessman

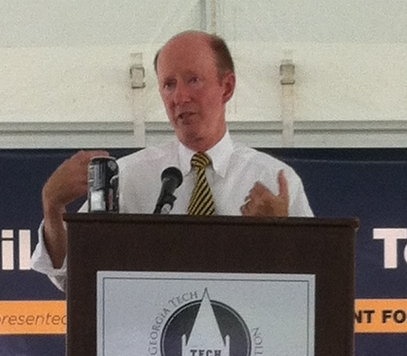
- Brock in 2013
- Born: May 6, 1948 (age 78); Moss Point, Mississippi, U.S.
- Education: Georgia Institute of Technology
- Employer: Coca-Cola Enterprises Inc.
- Title: Chairman and chief executive officer
- Term: 2006–2016
- Website: ccep.com

John F. Brock (born May 6, 1948), is an American businessman who was the chairman and chief executive officer of Coca-Cola Enterprises Inc. (CCE), the world's third-largest marketer, distributor, and producers of Coca-Cola products. He has more than 25 years of experience in the beverage sales industry.

== Coca-Cola Enterprises career ==
Brock joined Coca-Cola Enterprises as President and Chief Executive Officer and a member of the Board of Directors in April 2006. He was appointed Chairman in April 2008.

As Chairman and CEO of CCE, Brock and his leadership team established the company's first ever global operating framework with a single vision and three strategic priorities. Brock has played a key role in CCE's recent, significant distribution agreements, including glacéau, Abbey Well (in Great Britain), Monster and Cadbury Schweppes (in The Netherlands). He has also made it a priority to implement corporate responsibility and sustainability initiatives and business practices throughout CCE, such as operating the largest hybrid electric truck fleet in North America and establishing the subsidiary Coca-Cola Recycling to help lead the way in capturing the equivalent of 100 percent of Coca-Cola's packaging.

On June 25, 2012, Brock was named Business Leader of the Year at Ethical Corporation's 2012 Responsible Business Awards for leading and implementing Coca-Cola Enterprises' sustainability plan.

== Professional career history ==
In 1972, Brock joined Procter & Gamble in product development, and in 1983 was recruited by Cadbury Schweppes to head technical and operational functions in North America for both Schweppes and its sister business unit, Motts. Five years later, he was promoted to head of global marketing at Cadbury Schweppes. In 1990, Brock was named president of Cadbury Schweppes' international beverage division for markets outside the U.S. and Europe. Two years later, he was named president of Cadbury's European Beverages business, and soon thereafter became president of North American Beverages. In 1995, Brock and his team organized the acquisition of Dr Pepper/Seven Up (DPSU), and Brock became president and CEO of the total North American business. One year later, Brock joined the Board of Cadbury Schweppes and was named managing director and CEO of global beverages.

In 1999, Brock lead the formation of the Dr Pepper/Seven Up Bottling Group, Inc., which at the time bottled almost 60% of DPSU's volume in the independent system

In March 2000, Brock was named chief operating officer of Cadbury Schweppes and chairman of Dr Pepper/Seven Up Bottling Group's Board of Directors. Later that year, he was named Beverage Industry's Executive of the Year.

In 2003, Brock was named CEO of Interbrew, headquartered in Brussels, Belgium. In 2004, Brock and his team orchestrated the merger of Interbrew and AmBev to form InBev, the largest brewer in the world by volume. Brock was named CEO and managed the company whose global brands included Stella Artois, Beck's and Brahma.

Brock was recently named Chairman of the Americas for the International Business Leaders Forum (IBLF) and currently serves as a trustee on the global IBLF Board. Brock previously served as a director of Dow Jones & Company, The Campbell Soup Company, and Reed Elsevier, Plc in London. As a distinguished engineering alumnus from Georgia Tech, Brock has served on the President's Advisory Board and is currently serving on the Georgia Tech Foundation's board. John is also on the Board of Visitors for Owen Business School at Vanderbilt University.

=== Compensation ===
While CEO of Coca-Cola Enterprises in 2009, John F. Brock earned a total of $14,295,701, which included a base salary of $1,150,000, a cash bonus of $3,500,000, stocks granted of $6,720,605, and options granted of $2,799,898.

== Education and personal life ==
Brock earned both his Bachelor (1970) and Master (1971) of Science degrees in Chemical Engineering from the Georgia Institute of Technology in Atlanta, Georgia, where he was a brother of Phi Sigma Kappa fraternity.

He is married to Mary Brock, who is a co-owner of the Atlanta Dream of the Women's National Basketball Association. The couple has three children named John, Rebecca, and Major.

On September 15, 2010, it was announced Brock and his wife would donate up to $3.5 million to build a new indoor practice facility for the Georgia Tech football program. Brock and his family also funded two endowed faculty chairs worth a total of $6 million at Emory's Winship Cancer Institute and the Georgia Institute of Technology to support innovative research in cancer nanotechnology.

== Sources ==
- Coca-Cola Enterprises
- Coca-Cola Enterprises 2011 Annual Report
