= A dos vientos. Criticas y semblanzas =

Book by Ramon Domènec Perés i Perés

- First edition
- Author: Ramon Domènec Perés i Perés
- Language: Spanish
- Publication place: Spain

A dos vientos. Criticas y semblanzas is a collection of articles in Spanish by Ramon Domènec Perés i Perés, most published in La Vanguardia between 1888 and 1892, and published as a volume in 1892.

== Analysis ==
Perés defends (as in his Literary Criticism in Catalonia, of 1883) the exercise of criticism based on the information and intellectual competence, for which he cites authorities like Paul Bourget, Goncourt, Matthew Arnold, Henry James, Alas, and Pardo Bazan, among others. He discusses Menéndez Pelayo and Frederic Soler, the recent work of Palacio Valdés, Pérez Galdos, Juan Valera, Mestres, Verdaguer, Pin i Soler and Bosch de la Trinxeria, and two translations into Spanish, of Heine and of Pindar.

He sometimes drifts from the dominant belief that realism and modernity are synonymous, in such a way that one can see (for example in the pages devoted to Galdos) the unconscious signs of the exhaustion of the Realist rhetoric.

Perés is interested in looking at Catalan literature from the perspective of the Spanish. With a spirit that evokes that of the critic Yxart, he draws a portrait in which Catalan literature is praised for its evocative realism, in an analysis that is neither condescending nor pejorative, even in line with Renaixença readings. The Catalan literary establishment is taken to task for some rigidity in their habits of production and consumption, as well as for abusive protectionism, that nonetheless does not in any way take away from the intense creativity of a Mestres or a Verdaguer.

Addressing a number of questions (the novel as a demand of economy and coherence, the idea of poetry, the value of translations in literary life, doubts about the literary value of the work of Soler, Verdaguer as an ancient poet), the volume highlights the extraordinary value of the narrative of Galdos and of the poetry of Mestres. The collection obtained favorable reviews in the press of both Barcelona and Madrid.
