= Pump (bottled water) =

Bottled water brand available in Australia and New Zealand

- Type: Spring water, flavoured water, sparkling water
- Manufacturer: Coca-Cola Europacific Partners
- Distributor: Coca-Cola Europacific Partners
- Origin: New Zealand
- Introduced: 1997 (New Zealand), 1999 (Australia)
- Colour: Clear
- Variants: Pumped (flavoured), Pump+ (electrolytes), Pumped Sparkling
- Related products: Mount Franklin Water, Deep Spring
- Website: www.pump.co.nz

Pump is a brand of bottled spring and flavoured water sold in Australia and New Zealand. It is manufactured by Coca-Cola Europacific Partners and has been since its 2021 merger with Coca-Cola Amatil. Pump launched in 1997 in New Zealand and expanded to Australia in 1999.

== Product lines and marketing ==
Pump sources spring water from Te Waihou (Blue Spring) on the North Island and Wainoni Spring near Christchurch.

The Pumped range introduced flavoured variants (lime, watermelon, berry), followed by Pumped Sparkling, a lightly carbonated range. In 2016, Pump+ debuted as an electrolyte-infused variant in Australia.

=== Marketing campaigns ===
Pump launched "Pump-Cam: Grab Life by the Bottle" (2013), a user-generated video campaign where consumers used a custom mount and submitted footage, some of which appeared in TV ads. In 2017, the "Feel the flow" campaign featured a single-shot TV commercial with synchronized bucket drummers to symbolize hydration flow. In 2021, "Dairy Dancing", a TV spot by DDB Aotearoa, depicted a cyclist suddenly dancing after drinking Pump in a dairy, highlighting revitalization on the go. Also in 2025, oOh!media installed an oversized Pumped Sparkling bottle public display on Auckland's Queen Street as an experiential marketing activation.

== Market reception ==
In New Zealand, Pump held about 23% market share and experienced 20.4% annual growth, per The New Zealand Herald. A 2017 Ministry for the Environment report (by Deloitte) found Coca-Cola Amatil's water brands—including Pump—accounted for ~16% of supermarket bottled water value share. Australian consumer group CHOICE called Pump a prime example of bottled water branding, calling it “the marketing triumph of the century.”

== Public and environmental scrutiny ==
Consumer NZ criticized Pump flavoured water in the "Bad Taste Food Awards" (2017) for high sugar content. In 2019, mould was found in sealed Pump bottles in Australia, prompting Coca-Cola Amatil to issue an apology and investigate.

Pump's bottling of Blue Spring, a Māori taonga, sparked backlash over commercial rights and lack of compensation for local iwi and councils. A separate Herald investigation revealed bottlers pay ~500 times less per litre than households, prompting calls for regulatory reform.

== Sustainability ==
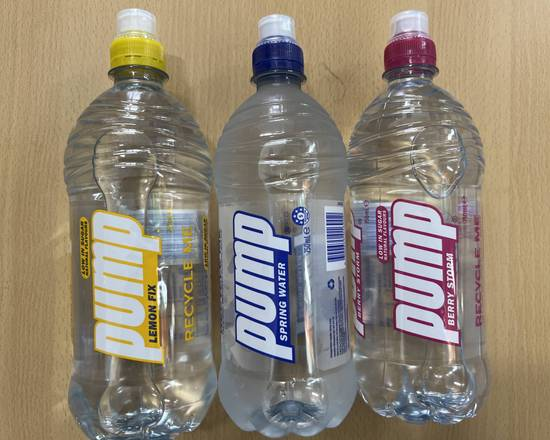
Pump water (middle) with Pumped Lemon Fix (discontinued) (left) and Pumped Berry storm (right)

Since 2020, Pump bottles in NZ and Australia are made from 100% recycled PET (rPET) (excluding caps and labels). Coca-Cola Europacific Partners aims for major sugar reduction targets and packaging sustainability, with Pump contributing to these goals.

== Ingredients and nutrition ==
Nutrition information varies by product line. For example, the 750 mL Pumped Watermelon contains per bottle:

- Energy: 229 kJ (55 Cal)
- Total carbohydrate: 13.1 g (of which sugars: 12.8 g)
- Sodium: 130 mg

Its ingredients include spring water, sugar, food acids (E330, E340), flavour, salt, preservative (E211), sweetener (E960), and antioxidant (E385).

By contrast, unflavoured Pump spring water has zero calories, zero sugars, and ~38 mg of sodium per 750 mL.

Flavoured but unsweetened varieties such as Pump Lime Rush and Pump Berry Storm provide negligible energy (<1 Cal per 100 mL) and include ingredients like food acids (E330), salt, preservatives (E211), flavours, and sweeteners (E950, E955, E960). Sodium content is approximately 15 mg per 100 mL.

== Distribution ==
Pump is available nationwide across supermarkets, petrol stations, convenience stores, gyms, and vending machines in both countries.

== See also ==
- Cool Ridge
- Mount Franklin Water
- List of Coca-Cola brands
- List of bottled water brands
