= Newminster Abbey =

Former Cistercian abbey in Northumberland, England

Coordinates: 55°9′59″N 1°42′16″W

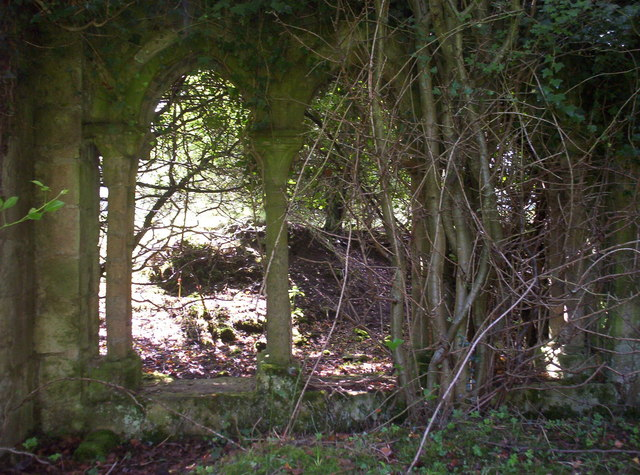

Newminster Abbey was a Cistercian abbey in Northumberland in the north of England. The site is protected by Grade II listed building and Scheduled Ancient Monument status.

Ranulph de Merlay, lord of Morpeth, and his wife, Juliana, daughter of Gospatric II, Earl of Lothian, founded the abbey in 1137 and Saint Robert of Newminster from the Cistercian Fountains Abbey was appointed as the first abbot; he governed from 1138 to 1159. The year after its foundation, the abbey (at that time only a group of timber buildings) was burned in an attack by Scottish raiders. The abbey construction resumed and in 1159 Abbot Robert died and was buried beneath the high altar. His tomb became a shrine and place of pilgrimage, and a number of miracles were ascribed to him so that eventually he was canonised.

From 1181 to 1536, the monks of Newminster Abbey held the lordship of Kidland with a right of way from Newminster

The abbey was located a short distance to the west of Morpeth, on the boundary between the lands of Ranulph de Merlay and Bertram of Mitford. Both these minor barons, and also D'Umfraville of Prudhoe, Lord of Redesdale, were significant benefactors in the abbey's early years. As a result, by 1240 the abbey possessed lands extending to Benton-on-Tyne where they had fisheries, to Cambois on the east coast where they had saltpans, and to Kidland on the Scottish border, where they annually led sheep to pasture during the summer months. The abbey established daughter houses at Pipewell Abbey in Northamptonshire, at Sawley Abbey near Clitheroe in Lancashire, and at Roche Abbey near Rotherham in South Yorkshire.

After closure during the first wave of dissolution in 1537, the estate was leased by the Crown to the Grey family who used many of the stones for their own buildings.

The estate including the site of the abbey was sold by the Crown to Robert Brandling in 1609, and was sold on by the Brandling family in 1709 to John Ord of Fenham.

The site is in private ownership and there is no public access or parking near it. However, the overgrown site can be viewed from the hill above it and from a public footpath that runs on the west side.

The abbey is the namesake of the Abbey Well water brand created by Waters & Robson.

== Burials at the abbey ==
- Saint Robert of Newminster d.1159
- Ranulph de Merlay (d. c.1170), his wife Juliana and his son Osbert
- Roger son of Ranulph de Merlay d.1188
- Roger son of Roger de Merlay d.1239
- Roger son of Roger de Merlay d.1265
- Ralph de Greystoke, 1st Baron Greystoke d.1323
- Robert de Umfraville, Earl of Angus d.1325
- Sir Robert de Umfraville (d.1437) and Isabelle his wife
- Ralph de Greystoke, 3rd Baron Greystoke d.1418

== Civil parish ==
Newminster Abbey was a civil parish: in 1891 the parish had a population of 174. Newminster Abbey was formerly a township in Morpeth parish; from 1866 Newminster Abbey was a civil parish in its own right until it was abolished on 30 September 1894 and merged with Morpeth; part also went to form Newminster.

== Sources ==
- Allsopp, Bruce; Clark, Ursula (1969). Historic Architecture of Northumberland. Newcastle upon Tyne: Oriel Press. ISBN 0 85362 062 8.
- Smailes, AE (1960). North England. Edinburgh: Thomas Nelson & Sons Ltd.
