= Fiji Bitter =

- Manufacturer: Paradise Beverages (Fiji) Limited
- Introduced: 1957
- Alcohol by volume: 4.6%
- Style: Lager
- Website: www.paradisebeverages.com.fj/Our-beverages/Fiji-Bitter

Fiji Bitter is one of the many beers manufactured in Fiji by Paradise Beverages (Fiji) Limited, a subsidiary of Coca-Cola Amatil. It is one of Fiji's widely consumed beers.

Paradise Beverages commenced brewing Fiji Bitter, in November 1958. The first keg went on sale in January 1959, following the official opening of the Carlton Brewery site in Suva.
