= HDR, Inc. =

American design firm

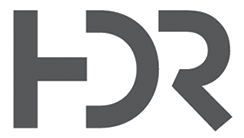

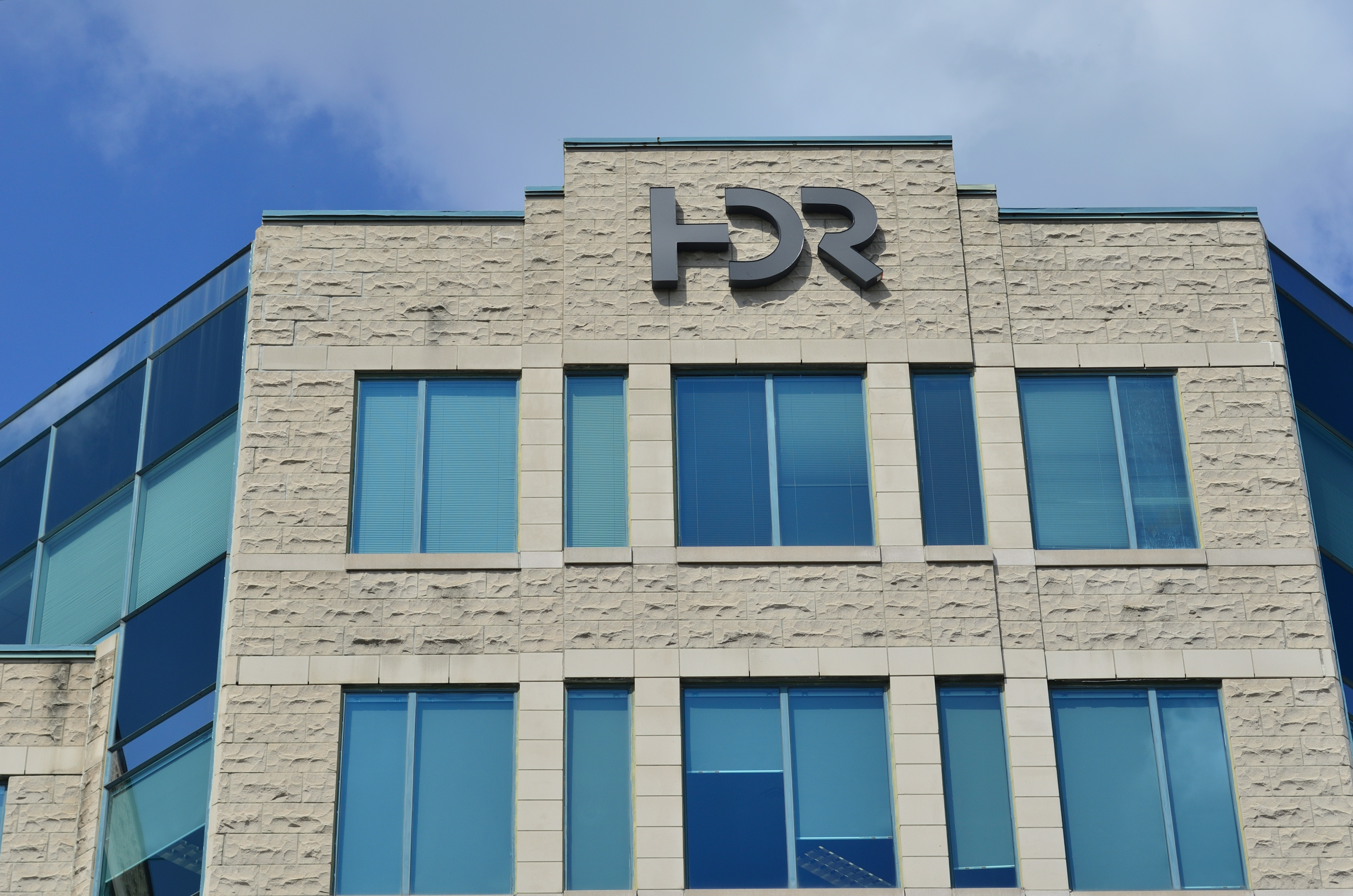
- HDR, Inc. in Canada
- Type: Private
- Industry: Professional Services
- Founded: 1917; 109 years ago, in Omaha, Nebraska, United States
- Headquarters: Omaha, Nebraska, United States
- Number of locations: More than 225 offices in North America, Asia, Europe, The Middle East, and Australia
- Key people: John Henderson (CEO); Eric L. Keen (chairman)
- Number of employees: 19,000+
- Website: hdrinc.com

HDR, Inc. is an American design and engineering company based in Omaha, Nebraska.

== History ==
In 1917, the Henningson Engineering Company started as a civil engineering firm in Omaha, where HDR's headquarters remain. Willard Richardson and Charles W. "Chuck" Durham joined the firm in 1939 as interns. Circa 1950, Richardson and Durham purchased shares in the firm, which then became known as Henningson, Durham, and Richardson, Inc.

The company's first project was designing a power station for the city of Ogallala, Nebraska. Similar projects followed as the firm built water, sewer, electric, and road systems for cities and towns throughout the Midwestern United States, emerging from frontier status.

In 1983, Bouygues SA, France's largest construction company, purchased HDR for $60 million. An employee group bought back HDR in 1996 for $55 million. The company has since grown from 1,100 employees to over 12,000.

== Acquisitions ==
Since the employee buyout in 1996 from the French conglomerate Bouygues, HDR has acquired over 60 firms worldwide. In February 2011, HDR acquired Cooper Medical, an Oklahoma City, Oklahoma, based firm providing integrated design and construction services for healthcare facilities throughout the U.S. The new alliance, HDR Cooper Medical, will provide a service design and construction delivery model to healthcare clients. In February 2011, HDR acquired Schiff Associates, a recognized leader in corrosion engineering headquartered in Claremont, California, with offices in Houston, Las Vegas, and San Diego.

In January 2011, HDR acquired HydroQual, Inc., specializing in water resource management. Based in Mahwah, N.J., HydroQual had nine offices in New Jersey, New York, Massachusetts, Florida, Utah, and Dubai. HydroQual is now conducting business as HDR. Also in January 2011, HDR acquired Amnis Engineering Ltd., based in Vancouver, British Columbia. The firm provides engineering and consulting services in British Columbia and some international locations for hydropower and water resources infrastructure.

In March 2013, HDR acquired TMK Architekten • Ingenieure, a German healthcare architecture firm. The merged company was the hub for HDR's healthcare and science design programs in Europe. In 2023, HDR sold its subsidiary HDR GmbH to a small group of employees in the country. The new operating company is Telluride Architektur GmbH.

In April 2013, HDR acquired Salva Resources, a global provider of technical and commercial services for mining exploration and investment in Brisbane, Australia.

In July 2013, HDR acquired the business and assets of Sharon Greene + Associates, a firm specializing in transportation economics and financial analysis.

In November 2013, HDR acquired Rice Daubney Architects, a firm in Sydney, Australia. The merged company is the hub for HDR's healthcare, defense, retail, and commercial work in Australia and HDR's retail and commercial work throughout the globe.

In January 2015, HDR acquired the assets of MEI, LLC, a liquid natural gas engineering and consulting firm based in Pooler, Georgia.

In July 2015, HDR acquired CEI Architecture of Vancouver, British Columbia, an architectural, planning, and interior design consultant.

In September 2017, HDR acquired a long-time partner, Maintenance Design Group, a firm specializing in the planning and designing of vehicle and fleet operations and maintenance facilities. HDR sought to add MDG's strengths in facility planning and design to complement its asset life-cycle approach to infrastructure development.

In 2018, HDR expanded its water resources services by acquiring the assets of David Ford Consulting Engineers, a firm based in Sacramento, California. The firm specializes in water hydraulics, flood risk analysis, reservoir systems and operations, water resource planning, and hydro-economics.

=== Hurley Palmer Flatt ===
In July 2019, HDR expanded its footprint in Europe and Asia by acquiring the British firm Hurley Palmer Flatt, as well as its subsidiaries; Hurley Palmer Flatt rebranded to HDR in early 2022.

Hurley Palmer Flatt was a multidisciplinary engineering consultancy based in London. It provided mechanical and electrical engineering consultancy and associated services. Established in 1968 in the UK by John Hurley as a building services consultancy, it expanded into a global company operating in Dubai, India, Australia, Singapore, and the US, engaging in both public and private sector development across various fields.

In 2009, Hurley Palmer Flatt acquired ATCO Consulting, expanding its reach in Scotland.

In 2014, Hurley Palmer Flatt acquired London-based mechanical and engineering firm Andrew Reid and Partners (AR&P) and took a majority controlling share of the business. AR&P had been established in 1970 by Andrew Reid. Its core services included diagnostic assessments of under-performing buildings and the management or independent validation of building engineering services commissioning. Its work in commissioning began at the Barbican Arts Centre, through all 14 phases of London's Broadgate development to the present day, including the 750,000 square foot headquarters for UBS at 5 Broadgate in London. Since the late 1990s, AR&P has successfully commissioned data centers for several of the world's most successful brands. Its design engineers were involved in work at The National Gallery from the mid-1980s when the company designed the building services for the new Sainsbury Wing, and have been involved in other museums and galleries including Dulwich Picture Gallery, the National Maritime Museum and the Imperial War Museum.

In 2016, Hurley Palmer Flatt acquired a majority share in the civil and structural engineering business Bradbrook Consulting, which had UK offices in London, Kingston, Watford, and Manchester, as well as a Dubai office.

In 2016, the company moved its central London office to 240 Blackfriars at the South Bank Tower on a 10-year lease as part of its expansion plan.

==== Notable Hurley Palmer Flatt projects ====
- Sea Containers House, UK
- Taymouth Castle, UK
- 195-197 Kings Road, UK, for Martins Properties
- Weston Library, Oxford University, UK, shortlisted for the 2016 Stirling Prize.
- Renovated Archive & Book Storage Facility, Bodleian Library, Oxford University, UK
- Aberdeen Exhibition And Conference Centre Energy Centre, UK, for Henry Boot Developments
- Singapore Changi Airport, Singapore
- New Data Centre Australian Securities Exchange, Australia
- 1 Knightsbridge, for JP Morgan, UK
- Croydon Data Centre, for Morgan Stanley, UK
- Dundee railway station, UK
- 10 Upper Bank Street & The Zig Zag Building, Victoria, for Deutsche Bank, UK
- 131 Sloane Street, for Marshall Wace, UK

==== Notable Andrew Reid and Partners projects ====
- The National Gallery
- The Imperial War Museum
- National Maritime Museum
- Broadgate development, London
- Deutsche Bank
- Mary Rose Trust
- Ashmolean Museum
- University of Greenwich
- Guildhall School of Music

==== Hurley Palmer Flatt awards and recognition ====
- Number 34 in Top 150 Consultants 2016 by Building
- View58 (58 Victoria Embankment) was Highly Commended the 2016 Property Awards in the Sustainability category
- Nominated for the Training Initiative of the Year at the Consultancy and Engineering Awards 2016
- Weston Library won AJ100 Building of the Year
- Weston Library also won the RIBA National Award 2016, RIBA South Award 2016 and the RIBA South Building of the Year 2016
- Winner in the Affordable Housing category at the Scottish Design Awards 2008 for Fyne Homes & CP Architects Gigha project in West Scotland
- Nominated for the CIBSE Employer of the Year 2017 Award
- Number 24 in Top 150 Consultants 2019 by Building

In June 2021, HDR acquired WKE, a multimodal transportation engineering firm based in Santa Ana, California. Their practice complements HDR's collaborative, full life cycle approach to infrastructure development and delivery of critical transportation programs in the Southwest region of the United States.

In September 2021, HDR acquired WRECO, a leader in innovative engineering solutions for communities throughout California based in Walnut Creek. The addition expands transportation and water resources services in the region.

In February 2022, HDR acquired SPF Water Engineering, a water, wastewater, and hydrogeologic consulting firm based in Boise, Idaho. As part of the asset acquisition, SPF includes MDS Drafting, which provides value-added services in BIM.

== Controversies ==
=== Prison design ===
HDR Architecture's jail and prison design projects have faced criticism from advocates in the communities where the projects are proposed. In 2019, advocates in Travis County, Texas, opposed the construction of a new women's jail, arguing the resources would be better spent on programs to address concerns like addiction and mental health. Following community pressure, Travis County commissioners indefinitely paused HDR's $4.6 million contract to design the women's jail in June 2021. HDR also faced criticism from advocates in Massachusetts after being selected in 2021 to design a new women's prison for the Massachusetts Department of Correction. Advocates opposed all new prison construction and particularly argued against HDR's proposed "trauma-informed" design, saying it was not possible in a prison environment.

=== Monitoring of activists ===
In August 2021, a Motherboard story detailed HDR's monitoring services provided to government agencies conducting controversial projects. The report highlighted HDR's "corporate counterinsurgency" work, especially social media monitoring, to anticipate and disrupt public opposition to projects, including highways built through sacred Indigenous sites and prison and jail construction.

=== Gender discrimination ===
A Nebraska jury awarded $3.85 million to a former HDR Vice President in November 2023, finding the engineering firm discriminated against her based on gender.

== Awards ==
In 2018, the American Council of Engineering Companies awarded the Grand Conceptor Award to HDR and joint venture partner WSP USA for the design and construction of a new roadway within the steel-arch Bayonne Bridge—64 feet above an existing highway that it was to replace. The Grand Conceptor Award signifies the year's most outstanding engineering achievement. The recognition marked HDR's fourth Grand Conceptor in the company's 100-year history and the second time that HDR received the award two years in a row. In 2017, the State Route 520 floating bridge earned the American Council of Engineering Companies' Grand Conceptor Award.

HDR also won back-to-back Grand Conceptor Awards in 2010 and 2011. The 2011 award winner was the Hoover Dam Bypass. HDR was the project manager. The Hoover Dam Bypass won several other industry awards. The 2010 winner was the Gills Onions Advanced Energy Recovery System in Oxnard, California, which uses onion waste to produce renewable energy.

== Miscellaneous ==
HDR has worked on projects in all 50 U.S. states and 10 countries, including notable projects such as the Hoover Dam Bypass, Alexander T. Augusta Military Medical Center, and Roslin Institute building. The firm employs over 12,000 professionals and represents hundreds of disciplines in various markets. HDR is the 5th largest employee-owned company in the United States with revenues of $2.8 billion in 2022. Engineering News-Record ranked HDR as the 6th largest design firm in the United States in 2023.
