= Samoa Breweries =

- Industry: Brewery
- Founded: 1978; 48 years ago
- Headquarters: Samoa
- Parent: Carlton Brewery of Fiji (1999-2011); Coca-Cola Amatil (from 2011)
- Website: vailima.ws

Samoa Breweries is the main brewer in Samoa, established in 1978.

It brews a German type lager beer, called Vailima after a village in Samoa. Samoa Breweries also brewed San Miguel under licence from 1982 to 1990. In 1999 a majority stake in the company (68.3%) was purchased by the Carlton Brewery of Fiji, a subsidiary of the Foster's Group, the remaining shares were held by the Samoan government (15%), the Nauruan government (10%) and the remainder by small shareholders. In 2011 Foster's was acquired by SABMiller which subsequently sold its Fiji and Samoa operations to Coca-Cola Amatil.

Main brands include Vailima Lager (4.9% alc v/v), Vailima Special Export (6.7% alc v/v)and Vailima Pure (4.9% low carb) In 2013 they released "Vailima Natural" which uses locally grown breadfruit in its recipe as a partial replacement for imported malted barley.

"Vailima" is literally translated from the Samoan as "water in hand" and has its origin in a Samoan folktale in which a woman revives her dying lover by carrying water to him in her hands.

Samoa Breweries also bottles Coca-Cola Amatil and allied soft-drink brands under licence. Annual production is approximately 8,500,000 litres of beer (85,000hL) and 6,500,000 litres of soft-drinks. The majority of beer produced is for the domestic market. Exports amount to about 12% with American Samoa, New Zealand and the Cook Islands being the main export markets.

In July 2022 Samoa Breweries announced it would cease brewing Vailima in Samoa and move production to Fiji. Following public opposition to the move it licensed production of the beer to a Samoan producer in August 2022.

== See also ==
- Paradise Beverages
