= Reddy Group =

- Founded: 1947
- Founder: Y P Reddy
- Headquarters: Suva, Fiji
- Area served: South Pacific
- Products: Hotels, Property Development, Real Estate
- Website: www.reddygroup.com

The Reddy Group is a diversified investment company founded in 1947 in Suva, Fiji Islands, by Ram Sami Reddy as a small family construction business. Over the past 75 years, it has evolved into a global family office with a broad portfolio spanning tourism, construction and hospitality. Ram Sami was later joined by his brother Ranga Sami Reddy, and in 1957, Yanktesh Permal (YP) Reddy entered the business, enabling expansion into Lautoka during a period of rapid growth in Fiji's building industry.

The company was originally founded in 1947 by Ram Sami Reddy, the second eldest brother, who began by building residential homes in Suva. He was later joined by his brother Ranga Sami Reddy. In 1957, Yanktesh Permal (YP) Reddy joined the business, allowing Ram Sami to expand operations to the western region of Fiji, where the construction industry was experiencing rapid growth.

In 1965, YP Reddy established Reddy's Enterprises Limited to invest in the emerging tourism sector. The Group acquired land near Nadi International Airport and developed the Tanoa Hotel, becoming Fiji's first locally owned tourist hotel. This marked the beginning of the Tanoa Hotel Group, which now operates eight hotels across Fiji, Samoa, and Tonga. Over the years, the Group expanded its hospitality footprint with properties across Fiji, including Rakiraki, Nadi, Lautoka, and Suva, as well as in Samoa with the Tanoa Tusitala Hotel and in Nuku’alofa, Tonga.

Reddy Construction went on to form a joint venture with Parkinson's UK Group to build the prestigious Lautoka Government Hospital. This along with the Group's early success in construction, paved the way for a partnership with Fletcher Construction of New Zealand. Together, they undertook a series of ambitious infrastructure projects, including the University of the South Pacific building extensions, ANZ Bank complexes in Suva and Lautoka, upgrades to Suva and Lautoka Wharves, sugar mill boiler installations and the development of the Sheraton Hotel in Denarau.Following the 1987 military coup and the passing of his brothers, YP Reddy shifted the Group's focus from construction to hospitality and real estate.

In 1970, the Group acquired shares in Clyde Engineering Co Ltd, a New Zealand company that expanded into Fiji to service heavy construction and industrial equipment. Clyde later acquired Boral Acrow's scaffolding hire business in 2001 and Nacap Hire in 2006, further diversifying the Group's operations.

The Reddy Group's growth has been guided by values of curiosity, humility, ambition, integrity, and compassion. With a strong commitment to social responsibility, the Reddy Foundation was established in 2015 to support vulnerable communities across Fiji, Samoa, Tonga and New Zealand. Its focus includes education, health, poverty relief, and community initiatives. Today, the Reddy Group continues to foster innovation and sustainable development, with people remaining at the heart of its success.
