= Sol Daurella =

Spanish business executive (born 1966)

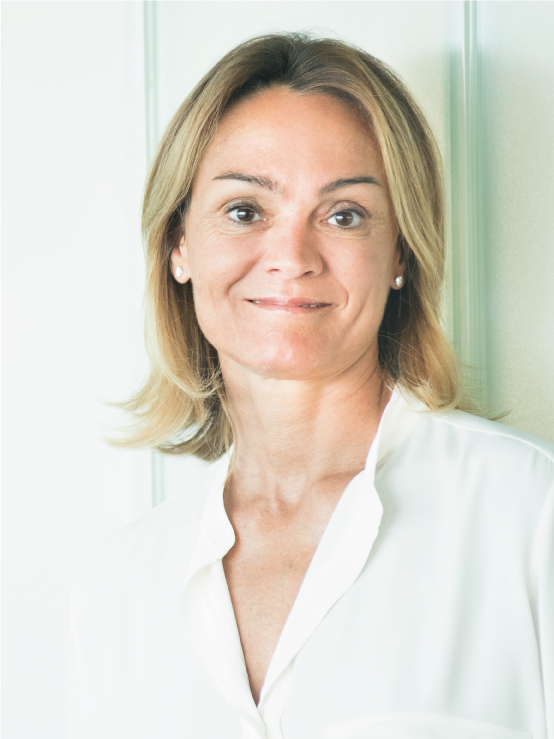
- Born: 1966 (age 59–60); Barcelona, Spain
- Occupation: Business executive
- Title: Chairperson, Coca-Cola European Partners
- Spouse: Carles Vilarrubi
- Children: 3

Sol Daurella Comadrán (born 1966) is a Spanish business executive. She is chairwoman of Coca-Cola Europacific Partners.

== Early life and education ==
Sol Daurella was born in 1966 in Barcelona, into a family with a long business tradition. She is the granddaughter of the Spanish importer of salted cod Santiago Daurella Rull and daughter of the entrepreneur José Daurella Franco.

The Daurella family has been part of the Coca-Cola global system since 1951, when they obtained the licence to bottle and distribute the Coca-Cola beverage in Spain, creating the first Spanish bottler.

Sol Daurella was educated in an English school in Montreux, Switzerland, and obtained her degree in business administration from University of Barcelona, followed by MBA from ESADE, and a master's degree in Finance from the University of California, Berkeley. She speaks four languages.

== Career ==
Daurella She began her professional career at Mac Group, a strategic consultancy firm, before joining the Coca-Cola System in 1992.

Coca-Cola European Partners was created in May 2016, after the merger of Coca-Cola Iberian Partners, Coca-Cola Enterprises, and the German bottler. Before her appointment as Chairman of Coca-Cola European Partners, she had been CEO at Coca-Cola Iberian Partners. Daurella is chair of UK-based Coca-Cola European Partners, a consumer goods company that produces and distributes an extensive range of nonalcoholic ready-to-drink beverages in thirteen European countries including Spain, Portugal, Andorra, France, United Kingdom, Germany, Belgium, Netherlands, Norway and Switzerland.

Daurella is also a director of other Coca-Cola bottlers such as Equatorial Coca-Cola Bottling Company, partially owned by TCCC, which operates in 12 countries in Western and Northern Africa.

She is also co-chair of Grupo Cacaolat, a dairy company which produces cocoa milkshakes and is based in Barcelona, Spain, as well as CEO and chair of Cobega.

== Other activities ==
Daurella has contributed her experience as a board member to a number of companies in the banking, construction, and energy sectors, as well as to other consumer goods companies.

Between 2010 and 2014, she was on the boards of Banco Sabadell, Acciona and Ebro Foods. In November 2014, she became been a board member of Banco Santander, ranked Eurozone's largest bank by market value.

She became honorary consul for Iceland and has been involved with nonprofit organisations dedicated to cancer research, health and well-being, and education.

== Personal life ==
Daurella was married to Joan Albiol, a former head of Puig's beauty division, with whom she has two sons. She later married business executive Carles Vilarrubi with whom she has a daughter.
