= Kidland =

Coordinates: 55.4064°N 2.1358°W

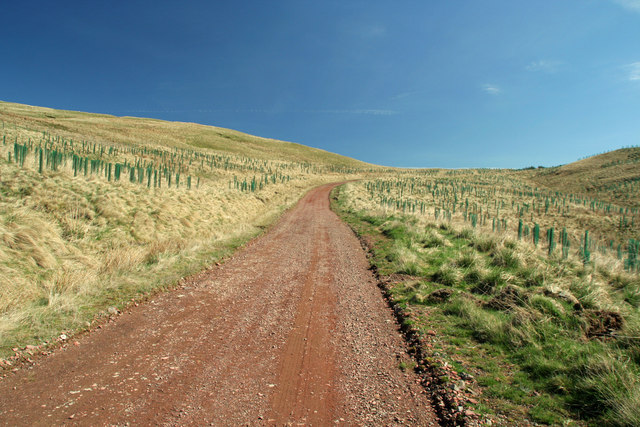
- Ward Law

- Location within Northumberland
- OS grid reference: NT915125
- Civil parish: Alwinton
- Unitary authority: Northumberland
- Shire county: Northumberland
- Region: North East
- Country: England
- Sovereign state: United Kingdom
- Post town: MORPETH
- Postcode district: NE65
- Police: Northumbria
- Fire: Northumberland
- Ambulance: North East
- UK Parliament: Berwick-upon-Tweed

Kidland is a former civil parish, now in the parish of Alwinton in Northumberland, England, about 2 miles (3 km) northwest of Alwinton village. In 1951 the parish had a population of 58.

== History ==
From 1181 to 1536, the monks of Newminster Abbey held the lordship of Kidland with a right of way from Newminster

From 1856 Kidland was a civil parish in its own right until it was merged with Alwinton on 1 April 1955.

== Governance ==
Kidland is in the parliamentary constituency of Berwick-upon-Tweed.

== Sources ==
- Smailes, AE (1960). North England. Edinburgh: Thomas Nelson & Sons Ltd.
