= Anchor bottler =

Term used by cola beverage manufacturers for their major bottlers

Anchor bottlers are a soft drink manufacturer’s major bottlers around the world. For example, The Coca-Cola Company employed the strategy of "anchor bottlers" to penetrate markets like China.

Notable anchor bottlers include:

- The Coca-Cola Company's anchor bottlers consist of many large multinational bottlers and major bottlers in the United States.
- The Pepsi Beverages subsidiary of PepsiCo is the company's anchor bottler for the North American market.
- The American Bottling Company, the bottling subsidiary of Keurig Dr Pepper, is the anchor bottler for most of the company's soda brands in the US.
