= Glaceau Smartwater =

Bottled water company

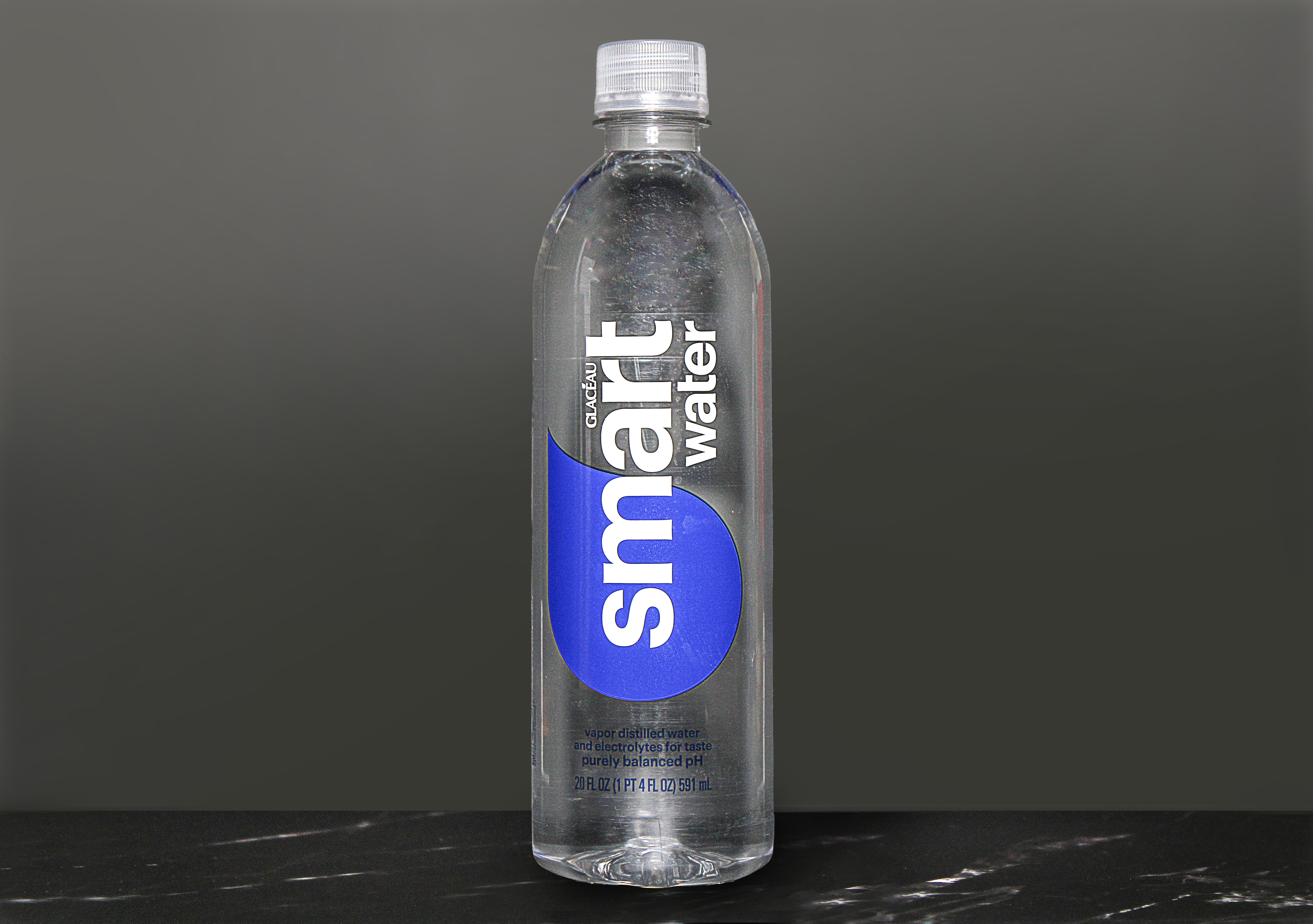
- Glaceau Smartwater 20 oz bottle
- Product type: Bottled water
- Current owner: Energy Brands privately owned subsidiary of the Coca-Cola Company
- Introduced: 1990; 36 years ago (US); 2014; 12 years ago (UK); 2017; 9 years ago (India); 2018; 8 years ago (The Netherlands, Russia)
- Markets: Australia, Brazil, Canada, Europe, India, Middle East, US, UK, China
- Ambassadors: Jennifer Aniston (2008–2020); Gal Gadot (2020–2022); Zendaya (2022–present)
- Website: drinksmartwater.com

Glaceau Smartwater (stylized as smartwater) is a brand of bottled water owned by Energy Brands, a subsidiary of the Coca-Cola Company. Introduced in 1990 as Glacier Mineral Water in the United States, it became known as Smart Water in 1998. By 2016, it was one of the top five most sold brands of bottled water in that country with sales worth nearly $830 million in 2017.

The brand is also available in other countries, including Argentina, Australia, Brazil, Canada, Chile, China, Croatia, France, Hungary India, Malaysia, Romania, Serbia, Singapore, the United Arab Emirates, and the United Kingdom.

== Product ==
Smartwater is manufactured by the process of distillation. This process removes most inorganic impurities like naturally dissolved minerals, but may let low boiling-point organic matter through. Afterwards, certain mineral electrolytes such as potassium, calcium and magnesium are added back. Foodwatch describes the process as "completely useless from a nutritional point of view". The Smartwater bottle (not the water itself) is used in ultralight backpacking because it is relatively light, strong, and compact, compared with other disposable water bottles.

== Pack and variants ==
Globally, the brand has several variants introduced in 2017, such as Glaceau Smartwater Sparkling Green Apple, Lemon, and Berry & Kiwi. In 2020, four new combination flavors were introduced: Cucumber Lime, Strawberry Blackberry, Pineapple Kiwi, and Watermelon Mint.. In 2024, the company launched 12oz aluminum cans.

== Marketing and sponsorship ==
Starting in 2008, American actress Jennifer Aniston was the ambassador for the brand globally and was involved in a number of campaigns as the face of the product. She was succeeded in 2020 by Israeli actress Gal Gadot.

In June 2022, Zendaya was announced as the global brand ambassador of Glaceau SmartWater and the face of its new campaign "Smart Solutions: Global Water Challenge (GWC)".

The packaging featured an image of a fantail goldfish; earlier packagings featured an otter.

Smartwater was launched in India through its association with TED Talks India Nayi Soch as the official sponsor for property.

== Criticism ==
In 2018, Smartwater was awarded the German Goldener Windbeutel ("Golden Windbag") anti-award by the consumer rights advocacy group Foodwatch Germany for "the most brazen lie in food advertising" that year. The group said that Smartwater is "nothing but ordinary water" sold by advertising a "scientifically-sounding but completely unnecessary production process" which yields no proven nutritional benefits, for as much as seven times the price of regular water. The product also won the Dutch Gouden Windei ("Golden Windbag") prize that year.

The Coca-Cola Company repudiated the criticism and said that it followed all applicable food labelling regulations in a transparent manner, that Foodwatch had nominated Coca-Cola in order to attract attention to itself, and that "the success of the water with consumers proved that they liked the product for the taste."
