= Vailima (beer) =

Type of beer brewed in Samoa

- Manufacturer: Samoa Breweries
- Introduced: 1978
- Alcohol by volume: 4.9% or 6.8%
- Style: German style Lager
- IBU scale: 20

Vailima is a family of beers brewed in Samoa by Samoa Breweries and is one of Samoa's most popular beers.

In July 2022 Samoa Breweries announced it would cease brewing Vailima in Samoa and move production to Fiji. Following public opposition to the move it licensed production of the beer to a Samoan producer in August 2022.
