= Mount Franklin Water =

Australian spring water brand

- Type: Spring water
- Manufacturer: Coca-Cola Europacific Partners
- Origin: Australia
- Introduced: 1981; 45 years ago
- Related products: Pump, Spring Water
- Website: https://mountfranklinwater.com.au/

Mount Franklin is a brand of bottled spring water available in Australia. It is owned and manufactured by Coca-Cola Europacific Partners.

== Products ==
Mount Franklin spring water is available in various sizes from 250 ml to 1.5 litres. A variety of flavoured waters are also available, as are carbonated varieties.

== Partnerships ==
Australian model Jennifer Hawkins has been the brand ambassador for Mount Franklin Lightly Sparkling Water since 2014. The brand is also associated with the National Breast Cancer Foundation, including through fundraising activities during Breast Cancer Awareness Months. From 2010, Mount Franklin also began a partnership with the McGrath Foundation to raise funds for breast care nurses across Australia.

From 2012 to 2018, the brand was the official water provider for the Australian Open tennis tournament. In 2018 the contract was transferred to Ganten, a bottled water company based in China.

== Awards ==
Mount Franklin was voted best bottled water in the 2013 Trip Advisor Australia's Travellers' Choice Favourites awards.

== See also ==
- Cool Ridge
- Pump
- List of bottled water brands
