= Coca-Cola Europacific Partners =

British multinational bottling company

Coca-Cola Europacific Partners plc
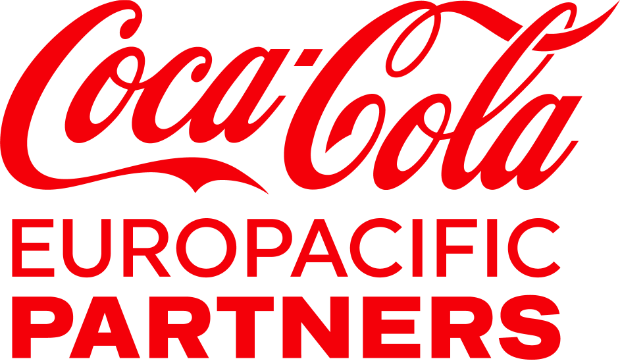
- Type: Public
- Traded as: LSE: CCEP; FTSE 100 component; Nasdaq: CCEP; Nasdaq-100 component
- ISIN: GB00BDCPN049
- Industry: Beverages
- Predecessors: Coca-Cola European Partners; Coca-Cola Enterprises; Coca-Cola Amatil
- Founded: 28 May 2016; 10 years ago (as Coca-Cola European Partners); 10 May 2021; 5 years ago (as Coca-Cola Europacific Partners)
- Headquarters: Uxbridge, England
- Number of locations: 85 production facilities (2025)
- Area served: Europe; Australia; Asia-Pacific; Indonesia
- Key people: Sol Daurella (chairman); Damian Gammell (CEO)
- Products: Regular, low- and no-calorie beverages including energy drinks, still and sparkling waters, juices and juice drinks, sports drinks, and ready-to-drink teas
- Brands: 54 brands (incl. Coca-Cola, Diet Coke, Coca-Cola Zero, Fanta, Sprite) and List of The Coca-Cola Company products
- Revenue: ▲€20.901 billion (2025)
- Operating income: ▲€2.793 billion (2025)
- Net income: ▲€1.979 billion (2025)
- Total assets: ▼€29.872 billion (2025)
- Total equity: ▼€8.303 billion (2025)
- Owners: Olive Partners (36%); The Coca-Cola Company (17%)
- Number of employees: 41,000 (2026)
- Website: www.cocacolaep.com

Coca-Cola Europacific Partners plc, also known as CCEP, is a multinational bottling company headquartered in the United Kingdom. It is the world's largest independent Coca-Cola bottler by net revenue and operates in 31 markets globally.

CCEP is listed on the London Stock Exchange, is a member of the FTSE 100 Index and is also traded on the Nasdaq stock exchange in the United States. CCEP shares are also available on Euronext Amsterdam and the Spanish Stock Exchange.

Formerly known as Coca-Cola European Partners (2016–2021), the company was formed as a merger of the three main bottling companies for The Coca-Cola Company in Western Europe. In 2021 it acquired Australian bottling company Coca-Cola Amatil to form Coca-Cola Europacific Partners.

== History ==
The company was formed as Coca-Cola European Partners on 28 May 2016 as a result of the combination of the three main bottling companies for The Coca-Cola Company in Western Europe: Coca-Cola Enterprises, Coca-Cola Iberian Partners S.A.U. and Coca-Cola Erfrischungsgetränke GmbH. The combination created the world's largest independent Coca-Cola bottler based on net revenues. The company reported revenue of €20.4 billion in 2024.

The company was first listed on the London Stock Exchange in March 2019, with shares being traded in euros.

Following the acquisition of Australian bottling company Coca-Cola Amatil, the company changed its name from Coca-Cola European Partners to Coca-Cola Europacific Partners on 10 May 2021.

In December 2022, the company bought the naming rights to Erebus Motorsport in the Supercars Championship. The team competed under the name Coca-Cola Racing by Erebus for the 2023 season. CCEP ended the partnership on 5 February 2024, before the start of the 2024 season.

On 23 February 2024, Philippine-based Aboitiz Equity Ventures Inc. (AEV) announced that it had jointly acquired Coca-Cola Beverages Philippines Inc. together with Coca-Cola Europacific Partners (CCEP) for $1.8 billion on a debt-free, cash-free basis. CCEP acquired a 60% stake, while Aboitiz Equity Ventures acquired the remaining 40%.

== Business operations ==
In 2025, CCEP operated in 31 markets across Europe, Australia, the Pacific, Indonesia and the Philippines, with 85 production facilities. The company manufactures, distributes and sells a portfolio that includes global brands such as Coca‑Cola, Sprite, Fanta and Monster, as well as local brands including Mezzo Mix, Urge and L&P. According to its annual reporting, more than 90% of the drinks it sells are produced in the country where they are consumed.

== See also ==
- Anchor bottler
- Coca-Cola Beverages Africa
