= Economy of Stamford, Connecticut =

The economy of Stamford, Connecticut is robust and is considered an anomaly for having a large number of corporate headquarters in a city of its size. In the 1980s and 90s, Stamford had the third highest concentration of Fortune 500 companies in the country, with 18 companies headquartered in the city. The only two cities that had higher concentrations in the nation were New York City and Chicago.

In 2017, the city had four Fortune 500 Companies, nine Fortune 1000 Companies, as well as numerous divisions of large corporations. In addition to the North American headquarters of Royal Bank of Scotland and a major office of UBS, many specialized hedge funds, asset managers and trading houses are localized in and around the city. This gives Stamford the largest financial district in New York Metro outside New York City itself and one of the largest concentrations of corporations in the nation.

In recent years, various digital media corporations have moved to Stamford as a less expensive place to do production while having easy access to both New York City and Boston. Corporations include NBCUniversal, NBC Sports Group, WWE, A+E Networks, The People's Court, YES Network, ITV America, This Old House, Charter Communications, Thomson Reuters, and Meredith Corporation.

== Notable companies ==
- AmeriCares Foundation- Global Headquarters located at 88 Hamilton Ave. Americares it is a nonprofit organization that focuses on disaster relief and world health issues. Forbes ranked it #17 on the 2016 100 Largest U.S. Charities list, and had revenues of over $740 million in 2015, with 98% of that going to charitable uses. The President & CEO is Michael Nyenhuis.
- Cenveo (CVO)- Global Headquarters located at 200 First Stamford Pl. Cenveo is a world leader in commercial printing, custom packaging, envelopes, and labels. It was ranked #989 on the 2016 Fortune 1000 list with over $1.9 billion in annual revenue and 7,300 employees worldwide. It was also ranked the 6th largest printing company in North America by Printing Impressions magazine in 2016. The CEO is Robert Burton.
- Charter Communications (CHTR)- Headquartered at 400 Atlantic St. Charter became the second largest cable communications company in the United States after its acquisitions of Time Warner Cable and Bright House Networks in 2016. It was ranked #96 on the 2017 Fortune 500 list, jumping nearly 200 positions from its 2016 ranking of #292. Charter is currently Stamford's largest earning company with annual revenue of over $29 billion, and employs over 91,500 people nationwide. The CEO for Charter Communications is Chris Winfrey.
- Conair Corporation- "De Facto" Headquarters located at 1 Cummings Point Rd. While the official headquarters are in East Windsor, NJ, owner and CEO Leandro (Lee) Rizzuto and most of the major executives have their offices in the Stamford office, giving it the de facto headquarter title. In recent years, Conair has expanded its workforce in Stamford to over 430 in 2017, and acquired a second office building in 2014. Forbes ranked Conair as #204 on their 2016 list of America's Largest Private Companies with revenue of $2.2 billion and almost 3,500 employees company-wide. Some of the brands owned by Conair include Cuisinart, Rusk, and Waring.
- Crane Co. (CR)- Headquartered at 100 First Stamford Pl. Crane Co. has a diverse portfolio of industrial products from aerospace and electronics components, to vending machines such as Dixie-Narco, to sensing and control systems. It was ranked #767 on the 2017 Fortune 1000 list with revenues of over $2.74 billion, and employs over 11,000 nationwide with about 85 working in the corporate headquarters in Stamford. The President & CEO is Max H. Mitchell.
- Deloitte- Office at 695 E. Main St. Deloitte is an industry leading consulting firm that specializes in asset management, financial advisory, tax, and audit services to clients. In 2017, Deloitte moved to Stamford in November 2014, and has quickly expanded to about 1,000 employees in the city, making one of the largest employers in Stamford. In 2016, Deloitte saw revenues of almost $37 billion and had over 244,400 employees globally. Deloitte's CEO is Joe Ucuzoglu, who became CEO in 2022. Previous CEO Cathy Engelbert became the first female CEO of a major US professional services firm in 2015 and was listed as one of Fortune's Most Powerful Women in 2015 and 2016. She left Deloitte in 2019 to become commissioner of the WNBA.
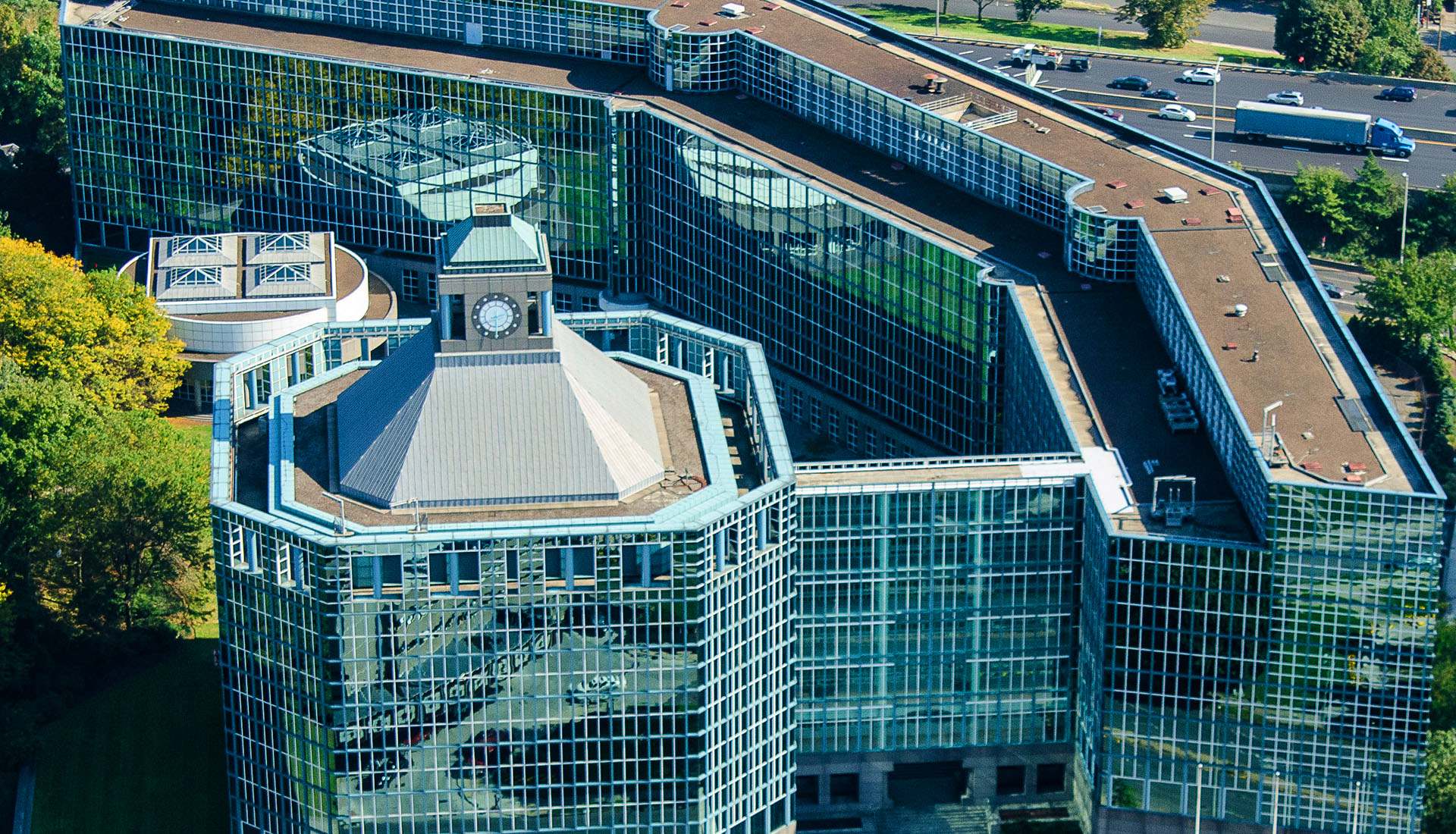
  695 East Main St. Headquarters of Henkel North American Consumer Goods and the Stamford Deloitte Office.
- Fujifilm Medical Systems - US Headquarters located at 419 West Ave. Fujifilm Medical Systems is a leading provider of medical image and information products including digital radiography, digital mammography, ultrasound, and PACS systems. Fujifilm Medical Systems USA employs about 175 in the Stamford headquarters office and is a wholly owned U.S. subsidiary of Fujifilm Holdings. The President & CEO is Masataka Akiyama.
- Gartner (IT)- Global Headquarters at 56 Top Gallant Road. It is the world's leading research and advisory company and provides research and analysis on the information technology sector to global technology business leaders in over 100 countries. In 2017, it ranked #821 on the Fortune 1000 list, had 8,813 employees worldwide and earned $2.45 billion in annual revenues. It is Stamford's largest corporate employer with about 1,200 employees at the global headquarters in 2017. The President & CEO is CEO Gene Hall.
- General Reinsurance Corporation (Gen Re)- Global Headquarters located at 120 Long Ridge Rd. Gen Re is a global reinsurance company founded over 170 years ago and is a division of Berkshire Hathaway. It is one of the largest reinsurers in the world and in 2016, earned over $900 million in profits, invested over $23 billion, and received an A++ rating from A.M. Best, Aa1 from Moody's and AA+ from S&P. The company employs over 1,500 people worldwide and about 450 in Stamford alone. Kara Raiguel has been CEO since 2016 and was named one of the World's Most Powerful Women by Fortune in 2016.
- Harman International Industries- Global headquarters at 400 Atlantic Street. Brands include AKG, Harman Kardon, Infinity, JBL, Lexicon and Mark Levinson. It ranked #386 on the 2017 Fortune 500 list with 26,000 employees globally, annual revenues of nearly $7 billion, and almost 150 Stamford-based employees. In November 2016, Harman was bought by Samsung for $8 billion, but continues to operate Separately and Independently through its world headquarters in Stamford, and retained Dinesh Paliwal as Harman's CEO.
- Hexcel (HXL)- Global headquarters at 281 Tresser Blvd. Hexcel develops and manufactures carbon fibers, industrial fabrics, and high-performance composite materials used in commercial aerospace, defense, and recreation industries. In 2017 it had over $2 billion in annual revenues, had over 6,100 employees, about 50 of those in Stamford, and ranked #936 on the Fortune 1000 list The Chairman, CEO and President is Nick Stanage.
- Henkel Corporation- Henkel North America Consumer Goods Headquarters located at 200 Elm St. Henkel moved their Consumer Goods headquarters from Scottsdale, AZ to Stamford in 2017, moving it closer to their Henkel North America headquarters in Rocky Hill, CT, and their Sun Products headquarters in Wilton, CT. The company currently employs 425 in Stamford and has plans to expand to over 500 jobs by 2018. Some of the company's major brands include Dial, Purex, Persil, Schwarzkopf Professional, Soft Scrub, Right Guard, and Snuggle fabric softener.
- Indeed.com- Co-headquartered at 177 Broad St. in Stamford as well as Austin, TX. Indeed, is the world's largest job search website. As of 2017, Indeed, employs 750 in its Stamford office, quickly growing from the 50 employees it had when it moved to Stamford in 2011. Indeed, currently has plans to expand its Stamford presence by increasing its workforce to over 1,200 in the next few years.
- NBC Sports Group- is a division of NBCUniversal that is responsible for NBC Sports' media properties, encompassing the NBC television network's sports division as well as day-to-day operation of the company's sports-oriented cable networks and other properties such as NBC Sports Radio. NBC consolidated its Sports division from two Stamford facilities, a Philadelphia office and its 30 Rock offices to its current home in Stamford. Administration, digital content, and television production for the NBC Sports Group including NBCSN many of its regional sports networks take place in the facility. NBC Sports is part of NBCUniversal, which generates $21 billion in revenue. NBCUniversal has another presence in Stamford at the Rich Forum where The Jerry Springer Show, Maury, and The Steve Wilkos Show are taped and produced. As of 2017, NBC Sports Group employs over 700 people in Stamford, and employs over 1,000 during the Olympic years, when Stamford is home of the live news coverage. NBCUniversal employs about 300 at the Rich Forum under the Stamford Media Center Productions division. The current Chairman is Mark Lazarus.
- Nestlé Waters North America- North American Headquarters at 900 Long Ridge Rd. Stamford houses the North America division of Nestlé Waters, and employs about 600 people in Stamford. Some of the major brands include Poland Spring, Nestlé Pure Life, Perrier, San Pellegrino, Arrowhead Water, Deer Park, Nestea, and Acqua Panna. The company currently employs over 550 in Stamford and as of May 1, 2017 the new president and CEO is Fernando Merce.
- Octagon Sports- Global headquarters at 290 Harbor Dr. Octagon is the world's largest sports and entertainment marketing company, and is a subsidiary of the Interpublic Group of Companies. In 2017, Octagon moved its global headquarters to Stamford by consolidating its previous global headquarters in Virginia and an office in Norwalk, CT and houses about 220 employees. The Chairman & CEO is Rick Dudley.
- Odyssey Re- (ORH)- Global headquarters at 300 Stamford Pl. Odyssey Re is a global property-casualty reinsurance company that became a wholly owned subsidiary of Fairfax Financial Holdings Ltd in 1996. The company has over 30 offices in 13 countries and had total assets of $10.2 billion and $3.8 billion in shareholders' equity as of December 31, 2016. The CEO Brian D. Young.
- Pitney Bowes- (PBI)- World headquarters at 3001 Summer St. Pitney Bowes is the world's largest maker of postal meters and mailing equipment and provides mailing and delivery software and services to companies. Founded in 1920 in Stamford, Pitney Bowes has a long history in the city including the naming of Walter Wheeler Drive in the city's South End for the company's longtime president and chairman who championed civil rights and diversity in the workplace. The company is constantly innovating and has for almost 100 years, having over 3,400 patents in 2013. Pitney Bowes powers the technology behind eBay and Amazon's shipping services. In 2017, it earned over $3.4 billion in annual revenues, had over 14,200 employees and ranked #663 on the Fortune 1000 list. The current CEO Martin B. Lautenbach.
- Purdue Pharma- World headquarters at 201 Tresser Blvd. Purdue Pharma is a drug maker that is most famous for creating OxyContin in 1996. After moving to Stamford in 2000, Purdue has expanded their products to include sleep medications, laxatives, antiseptics, and dietary supplements. Some other well known medications include Intermezzo, Senokot, Colace, Betadine, and Slow-Mag. Purdue Pharma has generated about $35 billion since releasing OxyContin in 1996, and the company generates about $3 billion a year. The current President & CEO is Craig Landau, MD.
- Point72 Asset Management- World headquarters at 72 Cummings Point Rd. Point72 was originally founded in 1992 but was re-branded as the successor to S.A.C. Capital Advisers in 2014 in the wake of SEC investigations. Point72 primarily invests in discretionary long/short equities and makes significant quantitative and macro investments and is a family office. The firm is headquartered in Stamford, Connecticut, and maintains affiliated offices in New York, London, Hong Kong, Tokyo, Singapore, and Paris. Currently, the company has about 1,100 employees, about half of them are located at the Stamford headquarters office and the office manages over $11 billion. The Chairman & CEO is Steven A. Cohen.
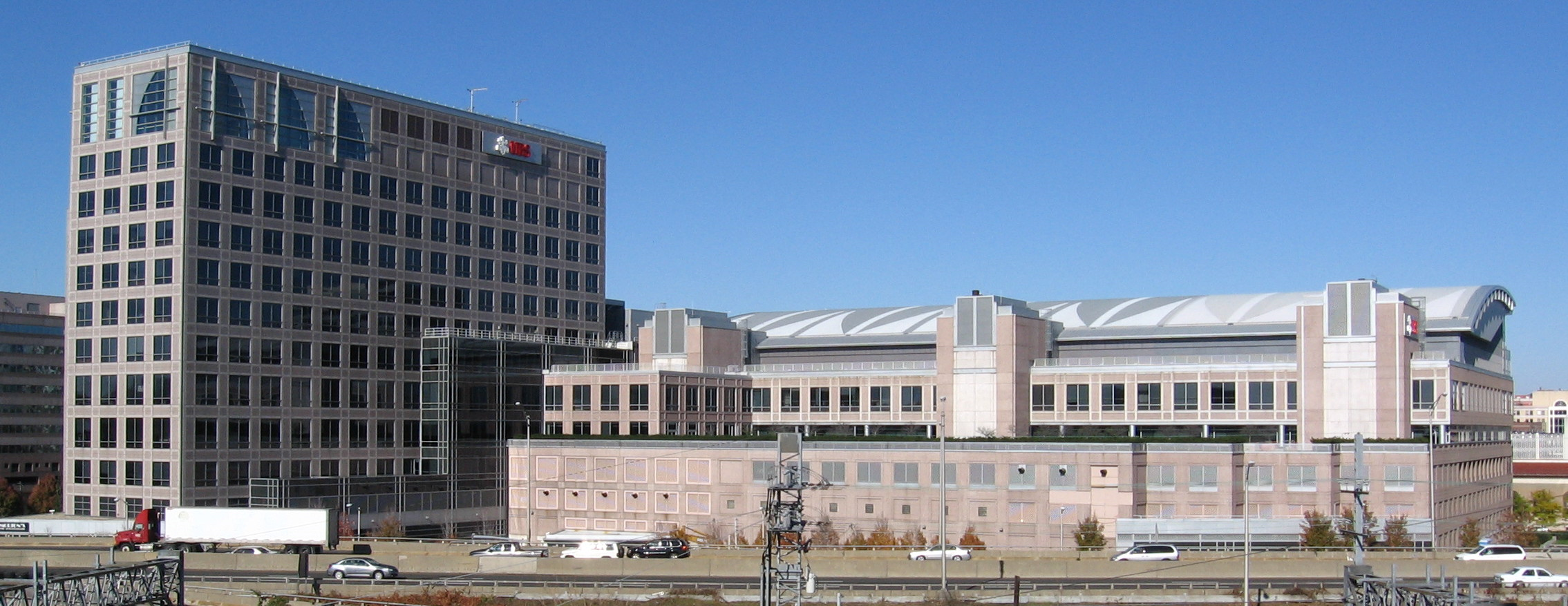
- UBS Investment Bank's offices in Stamford, Connecticut. When the building opened it featured the largest trading floor ever built.
  RBS Securities/NatWest Markets- North American headquarters at 600 Washington Blvd. In 2006, RBS constructed their $500 million building across the street from what was, at the time, the UBS American headquarters and built one of the largest trading floors in the world. Before moving to Stamford, RBS Securities America was known as Greenwich Capital, formally located in Greenwich, CT. After the 2008 recession, RBS was forced to cease their risky trading operations and opted to suspend their international retail banking services. As of 2016, RBS Securities has re-branded again and now goes by NatWest Markets. This is part of a restructuring by RBS to meet new rules requiring UK banks to separate domestic retail banking from riskier areas to better protect savers and taxpayers. While both RBS and UBS have downsized globally, they have both maintained significant presences in Stamford, with RBS/NatWest employing 700 in Stamford as of 2017. The current CEO of RBS is Alison Rose.
- Silgan Holdings (SLGN)- World headquarters at 4 Landmark Sq. Silgan Holdings is a leading supplier of rigid packaging for consumer goods products including shelf-stable food, beverage, health care, garden, home, and beauty products. The Silgan Containers subsidiary holds 50 percent share of the U.S. metal food container market. The company also operates 100 manufacturing facilities in North and South America, Europe and Asia. In 2017, Silgan had 9,100 employees, annual revenues of $3.6 billion, and ranked #629 on the Fortune 1000 list. The current CEO is Anthony J. Allott.
- Synchrony Financial- Global headquarters at 777 Long Ridge Rd. Synchrony Financial offers consumer financing products, including credit, promotional financing and loyalty programs, and installment lending, and FDIC insured savings products through Synchrony Bank, its wholly owned subsidiary. It is the largest provider of private label credit cards in the U.S. In 2014, the company comprised 42 percent of the private label credit card market. It is a spin-off of GE Capital Retail Bank, which sold its assets in 2014. In 2017, Synchrony Financial ranked #185 on the Fortune 500 list, earned over $15 billion in annual revenues, and had over 15,000 employees worldwide, with 660 of them working at the headquarters in Stamford. The current CEO is Margaret Keane who made history as one of the first female CEOs of a multibillion-dollar bank and Synchrony became the most valuable bank in the US run by a woman. Keane is one of only two women, the other being Beth Mooney of KeyCorp, who lead an independently traded US bank whose value is over $10 billion.
- Thomson Reuters- Major office at One Station Pl. This office is former global headquarters of The Thomson Corporation, which merged in 2008 with Reuters Group to form Thomson Reuters. After the merger, CEO Jim Smith and CFO Stephane Bello worked from the Stamford office along with many other c-level executives. But in 2017, Reuters announced that all of the corporate heads in Stamford and New York City would be moving to a new technology center in Toronto.
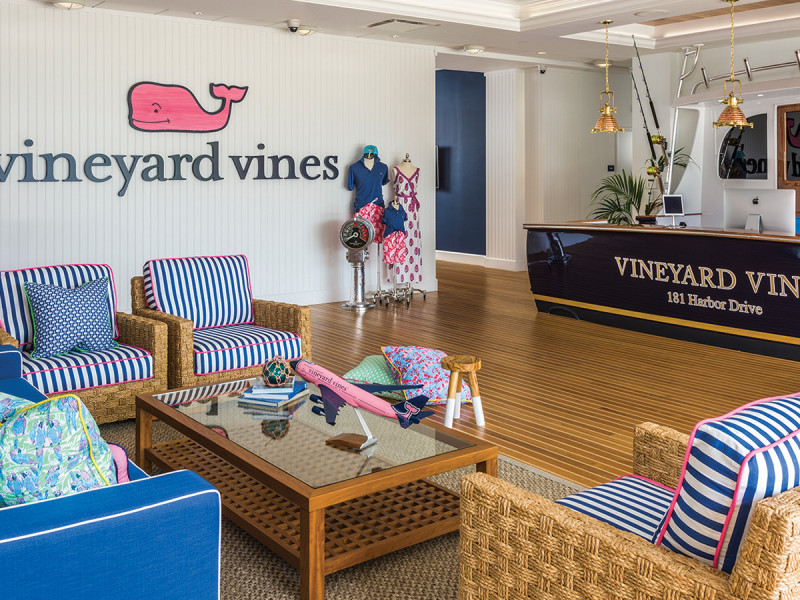
  Inside Vineyard Vines Stamford headquarters
- UBS AG- Major office at 600 Washington Blvd. In 1997, UBS Warburg, the American investment banking division of UBS AG completed construction on their new American headquarters at 677 Washington Blvd, moving it from Manhattan. The headquarters was then expanded in 2002 to total 910,000 square feet, including a 103,000 square foot trading floor. The trading floor in Stamford, Connecticut holds the Guinness World Record as the largest securities trading floor in the world and is roughly the size of two football fields. After the 2008 recession, UBS was forced to cease their risky trading operations and went through a significant corporate restructuring that left wealth and asset management duties in Stamford. In 2016, UBS moved their 800+ employees to rival bank RBS' American headquarters across the street at 600 Washington Blvd. UBS also maintains a financial services branch at 750 Washington Blvd.
- United Rentals- World headquarters at 224 Selleck St. It is the largest equipment rental company in the world. As of 2017, United Rentals had over 13,600, had annual revenues of over $5.75 billion, and ranked #452 on the 2017 Fortune 500 list. In 2017, the company made multiple acquisitions including the power equipment assets from Cummings Inc, and Neff Rental. The current President, CEO, & Director is Michael J. Kneeland.
- Vineyard Vines- Global headquarters at 181 Harbor Dr. The company designs and sells ties, polo shirts, dress shirts, flip-flops and other apparel. In 2005 the company made the Inc. magazine "Inc. 500" list of fastest growing companies, placing at No. 202 with revenue growth of 547 over three years (2002 to 2004). In 2006, the company again made the list, this time at No. 217 with 569.4 percent growth in revenues over three years (from 2003 to 2005). Its 2005 revenues came to 23.8 million (up from 13.2 the year before) and 85 employees (up from 45 the year before), according to Inc. In 2016, the company was estimated to be work about $1 billion, enjoyed annual revenues of over $300 million, and employed about 250 people at the Stamford headquarters. The current CEO and Co-Founder is Shep Murray, while his brother Ian Murray is Co-Founder.
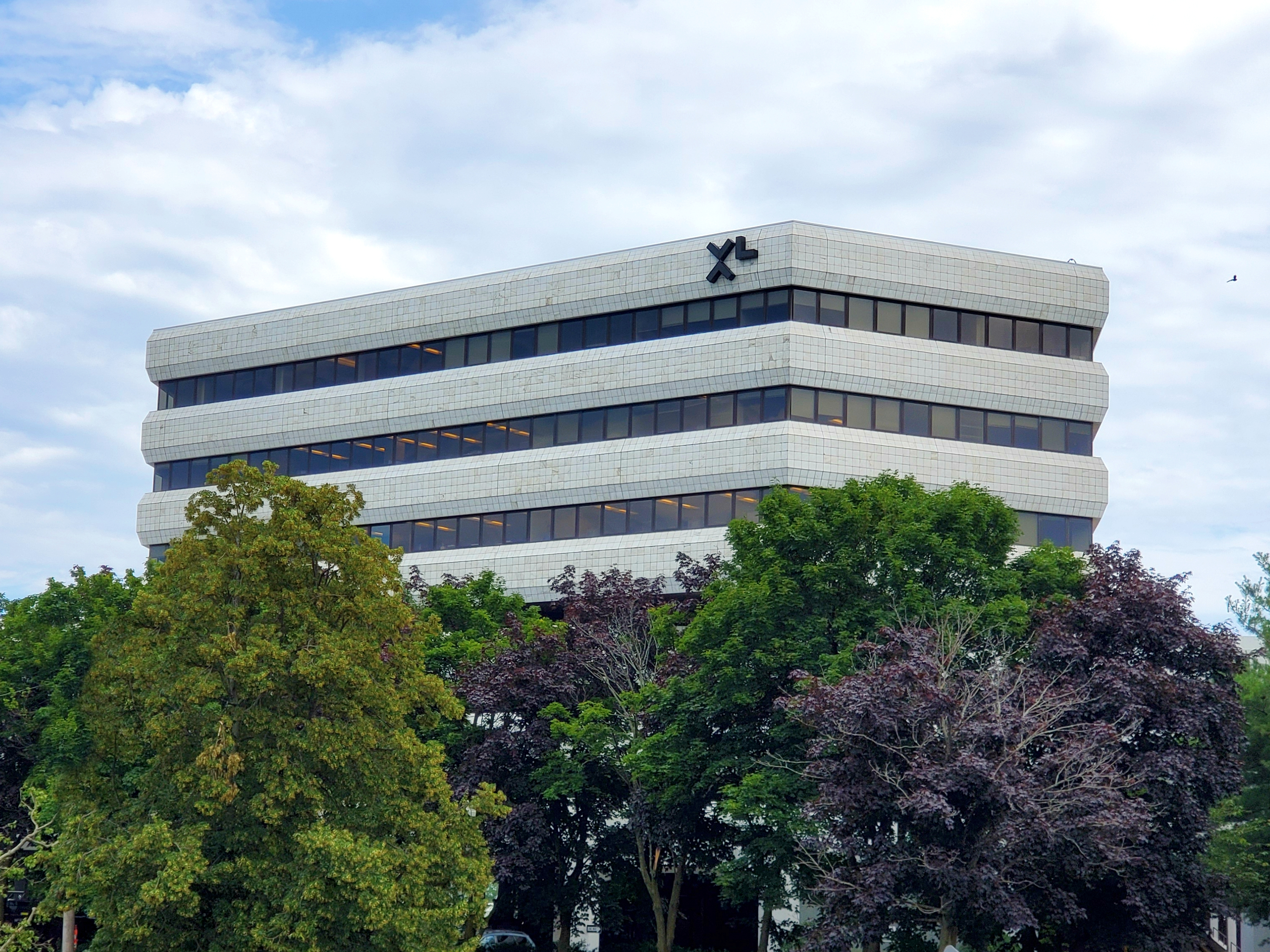
- AXA XL's headquarters at 70 Seaview Ave in Stamford
  World Wrestling Entertainment (WWE)- Global headquarters at 1241 E. Main St known as "Titan Towers". WWE is the largest professional wrestling company in the world, and hosts several high-profile programs such as Raw, SmackDown, and WrestleMania and hols approximately 320 live events per year throughout the world. Besides the corporate headquarters, the company also maintains a production studio at 120 Hamilton Ave in Stamford. In 2016, revenue increased 11% to $729.2 million, the highest in the company's history, including record levels of revenue from its Network, Television, Live Event, Venue Merchandise, and WWE Shop segments, and WWE Network averaged more than 1.63 million average paid subscribers. WWE currently employs over 700 people in their Stamford headquarters and their production studios. In 2019, WWE announced they would move from their longtime headquarters at "Titan Towers" to the 677 Washington Blvd in Downtown Stamford by 2021. Vince McMahon, the grandson of WWE founder Jess McMahon, was CEO from 1982 to 2022, and an occasional in-ring performer for the company in the 1990s. In 2023, WWE was acquired by Zuffa, the parent company of MMA's Ultimate Fighting Championship, with both now part of WME Group under the TKO Group Holdings umbrella. The current WWE president is Nick Khan, with Vince McMahon's son-in-law Paul "Triple H" Levesque as chief content officer (aka booker).
- AXA XL- American headquarters at 70 Seaview Ave. XL America is the American division of AXA XL, a global insurance and reinsurance company providing property, casualty and specialty products to industrial, commercial and professional firms. AXA XL has two Stamford offices, the XL America headquarters at 70 Seaview Ave, and a smaller office at 100 Washington Blvd which houses most of AXA XL's C-suite executives. XL America subsidiaries based in Stamford include XL Reinsurance America, XL Insurance America, Greenwich Insurance Company, Indian Harbor Insurance Company, XL Insurance Company of New York, Inc., XL Specialty Insurance Company, Catlin Insurance Company As of 2017, AXA XL's two offices in Stamford employed over 400 people. The COO of AXA XL is Greg Hendrick.

=== Top Employers ===
As of March 2018, the top 20 employers in Stamford are:

Rank	Employer	Employees
1	Stamford Health Group	3,600
2	City of Stamford	3,300
3	Charter Communications	2,000
4	Indeed.com	1,700
5	Gartner	1,650
6	Stamford Town Center	1,500
7	Deloitte	1,150
8	NBC Sports Group & NBCUniversal	1,075
9	PwC	900
10	UBS AG	800
11	Synchrony Financial	740
12	WWE	700
13	Nestlé Waters North America	610
14	Chelsea Piers Connecticut	590
15	Point72 Asset Management	550
16	RBS/NatWest Markets	540
17	Henkel North America	500
18	Gen Re (General Reinsurance)	450
19	KPMG	435
20	Conair Corporation	430
