= Madison Blue Spring State Park =

State park in Florida, United States

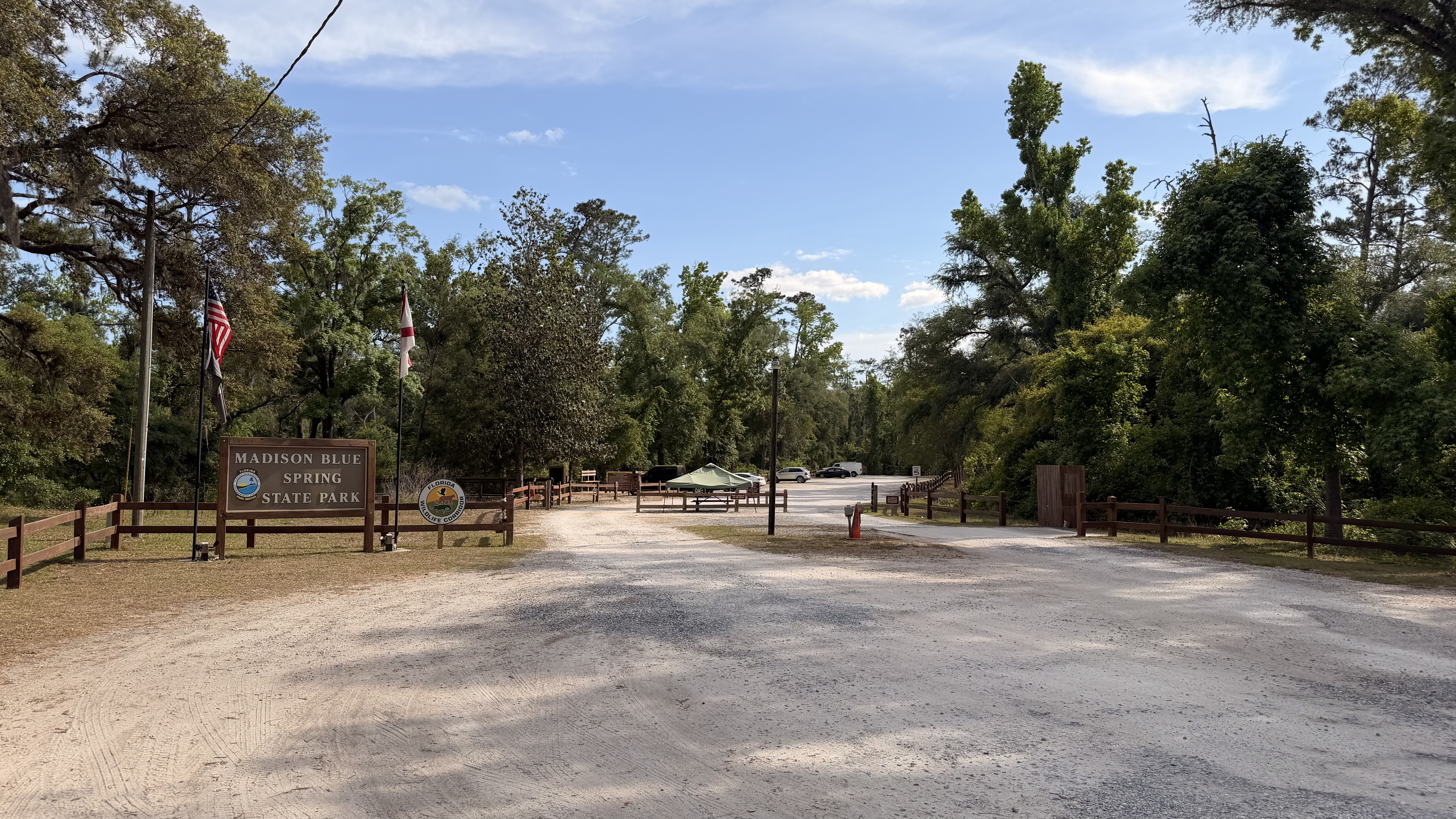
- Main park gate

- Location within Florida Location within the United States
- Interactive map of Madison Blue Spring State Park
- Location: Madison County, Florida, USA
- Nearest city: Madison, Florida
- Coordinates: 30°28′54.17″N 83°14′40.69″W
- Governing body: Florida Department of Environmental Protection

Madison Blue Spring State Park is a Florida State Park, located approximately ten miles east of Madison on the west bank of the Withlacoochee River. It contains one of the state's 33 first magnitude springs. This title entails that the spring is discharging at least 2,800 liters of water per second.

== History ==
The park was established after a private owner sold 38 acres at the spring in 2002. Prior to the property being sold Madison Blue Spring was utilized as a fresh water source for local inhabitants. This crystal-clear spring is about 25 feet (7.6 m) deep, 82 feet (25 m) wide, and includes a 150-foot spring run that pours into the Withlacoochee River. This rolling water stems from a 25 feet (7.6 m) deep cavern. Florida State parks explains how this stream of water impacts 23.7% of flow of the Withlacoochee River, into the opposite direction. This then results in a swept river bottom along with the formation of a large arc of clear water.

Along the Withlacoochee River one can find distinct examples of karst topography, which includes Suwannee Limestone, of the Oligocene age. Subsequently, Nestlé bought 2 adjoining acres, and a preexisting, but unused, bottling permit. After contentious hearings, the state authorized Nestlé to move forward, and tax incentives were approved for Nestlé's construction of a bottling plant. The plant opened in 2004. Water from this operation is used for Nestlé's Deer Park and Zephyrhills bottled water brands. Not only is Madison Blue Springs State a prime source for bottle planting but it also provides many recreational resources for individuals. These of which include birding, fishing, paddling, picking, diving, swimming, and tubing.

== Features ==
Madison Blue Spring is known for its cool waters and underwater caves. The waters remain at a constant temperature of 72 °F (22 °C) year-round. Madison Blue Springs underwater cave systems are internationally known, meaning they attract a variety of divers nationwide. According to Florida State Parks, exploration of over 7,900 meters (26,000 ft) of underground passages has occurred. Within the spring, one can easily spot catfish, freshwater turtles, and sunfish. Yet, this is not the only marine life, below the surface within the intricate cave systems, three rather unique species of crustaceans exist and thrive. As reported by Florida State Parks, these include Hobb's cave amphipod, the pallid cave crayfish, and the swimming little cave isopod.

== Gallery ==
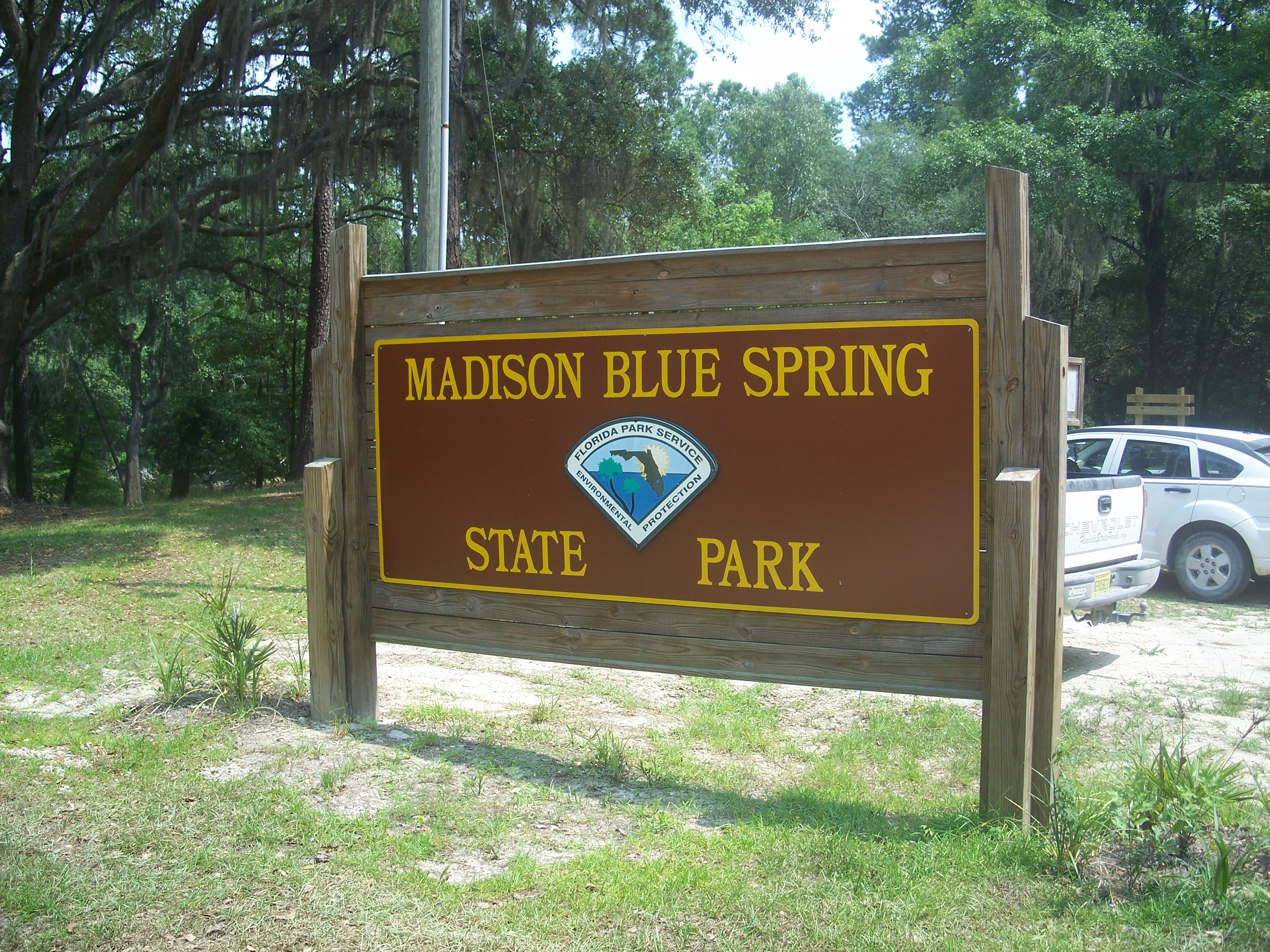
Sign

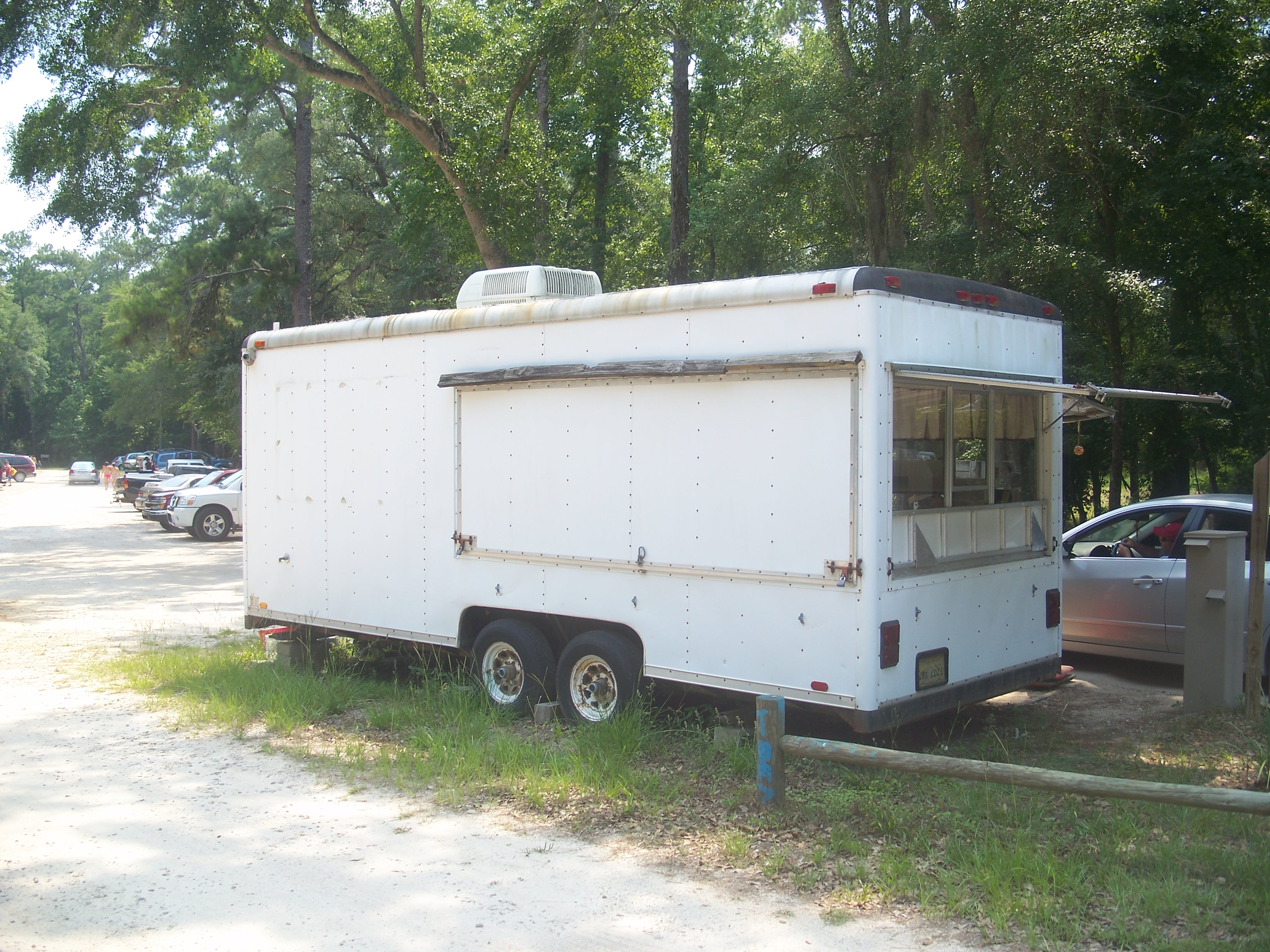
Ranger station

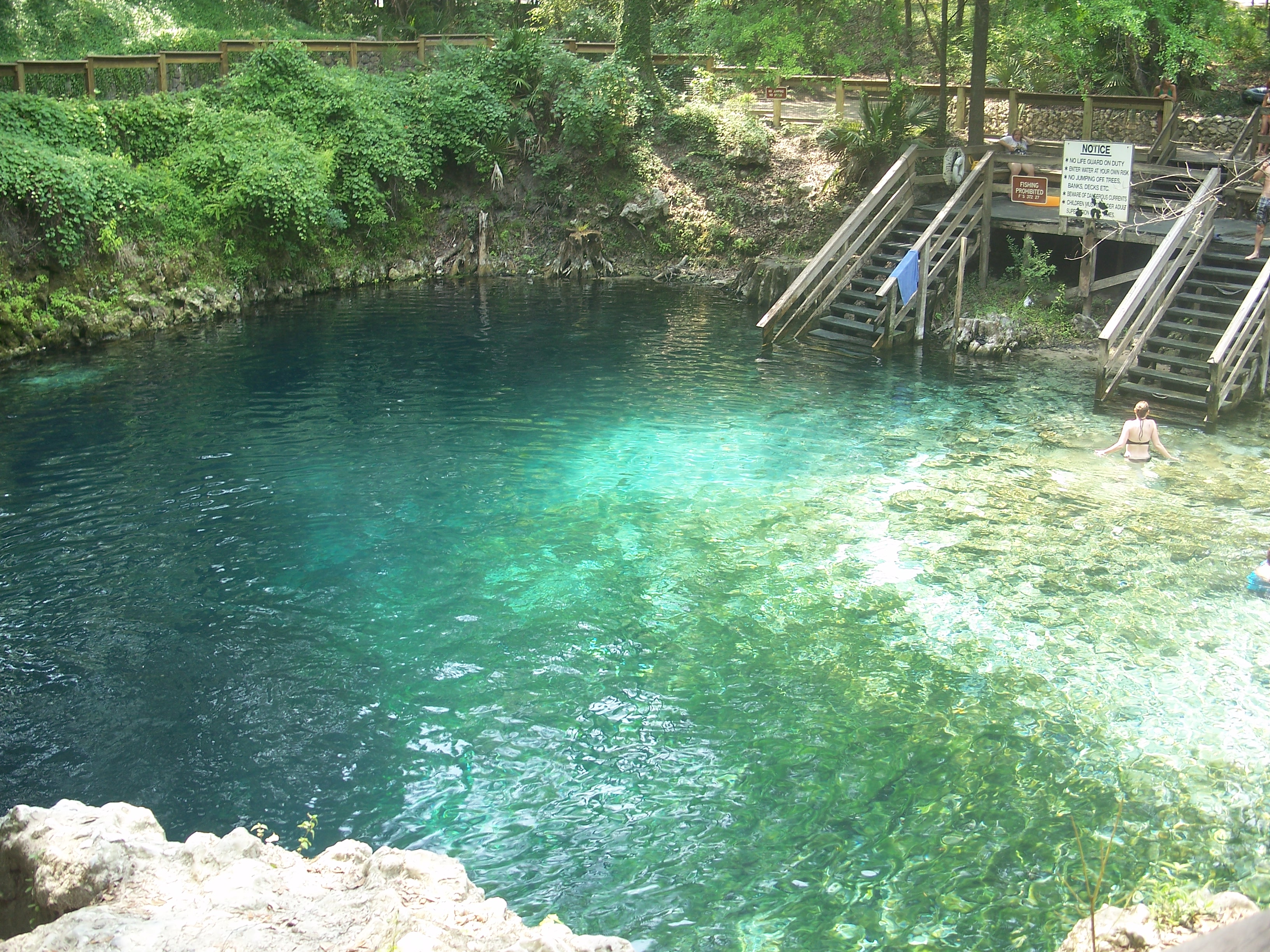
Spring
