= BlueTriton Brands =

American beverage company

BlueTriton Brands, Inc.
- Formerly: Great Waters of France, Inc. (1976–1994); Great Spring Waters of America, Inc. (1994–2002); Nestlé Waters North America, Inc. (2002–2021)
- Type: Subsidiary
- Industry: Beverage
- Founded: June 17, 1976; 50 years ago
- Headquarters: Stamford, Connecticut, United States
- Number of locations: 27 production facilities
- Area served: United States; Canada
- Key people: Dean Metropoulos (CEO)
- Products: Bottled water
- Brands: Arrowhead Water; Deer Park Spring Water; Ice Mountain; Nestlé Pure Life; Saratoga Water; Ozarka; Niagara Water; Poland Spring; Zephyrhills; Splash Refresher
- Parent: Primo Brands
- Subsidiaries: ReadyRefresh
- Website: bluetriton.com

BlueTriton Brands, Inc. is an American beverage company based in Stamford, Connecticut and a subsidiary of Primo Brands. A former subsidiary of Nestlé, it was known between 2002 and 2021 as Nestlé Waters North America, Inc. and operated as the North American business unit of Nestlé Waters. It produced and distributed numerous brands of bottled water across North America including Arrowhead Water, Deer Park Spring Water, Ice Mountain, Pure Life, Splash, Saratoga, Ozarka, Poland Spring, and Zephyrhills.

In early April 2021, the sale of the company's bottling operations to One Rock Capital Partners LLC and Metropoulos & Co. was concluded. BlueTriton merged with Primo Water a year and a half later.

== History ==
The company was founded in 1976 by Perrier as Great Waters of France, Inc. to sell and produce Perrier in the United States. In January 1979, the company opened its first production facility in the United States. From 1976 to 1979, the company was able to increase its sales from three million bottles a year to two billion bottles a year. In 1980, the company bought Calistoga and Poland Spring, the latter of which was nearing bankruptcy at the time. In the following seven years, Perrier increased the sales of Poland Spring from US$4 million to US$80 million.

In 1987, the company acquired Arrowhead Water from Beatrice Foods, giving it 21 percent of the total United States bottled water market and making it the largest producer of bottled water in the country. In October 1993, Perrier Group of America, Inc., the parent company of Great Waters of France acquired Deer Park Spring Water from The Clorox Company. In 1994, Great Waters of France, Arrowhead Water, Calistoga, Poland Spring, and Zephyrhills merged to form Great Spring Waters of America, Inc.

In 2000, the Californian company Big Sur Bottled Water, Inc. was acquired by Great Spring Waters of America. On October 19, 2000, Perrier Group of America acquired the Canadian company Aberfoyle Springs and its two manufacturing plants, one in Ontario and one in British Columbia. From 2002 to 2003, Nestle began transition away from the Aberfoyle brand and towards the Nestlé Pure Life brand.

In April 2002, the company bought Sparkling Spring Water Co., the largest water company in the Chicago metropolitan area. The company owned six facilities in Illinois and Wisconsin and was around for over 100 years at the time of the acquisition. That same month, Great Spring Waters of America was renamed to Nestlé Waters North America, Inc. and the assets of Perrier Group of America were combined into the new company. At the same time, its parent company, Perrier Vittel, was renamed to Nestlé Waters.

In July 2020, Nestlé Canada announced that it had agreed to sell its Canadian water bottling business to Ice River Springs. The latter would acquire the source and bottling operations in Puslinch, Ontario (Aberfoyle) and in Hope, British Columbia and an untapped well in Erin, Ontario. The sale fell through in September 2020.

In February 2021, Nestlé announced that it had agreed to sell Nestlé Waters North America, Inc. (NWNA) to One Rock Capital Partners and Metropoulos & Co. – the deal did not include the Perrier, S.Pellegrino and Acqua Panna brands. After the US$4.3 billion transaction was completed in April, NWNA announced it would change its name to BlueTriton Brands, a reference to the Greek god Triton.

== Brands ==
The company produces water under the brand names Arrowhead Water, Deer Park Spring Water, Ice Mountain, Nestlé Pure Life, Splash Refresher, Ozarka, Poland Spring, and Zephyrhills. The company also formerly produced water under brands like Calistoga. Before being sold by Nestle, the company also bottled water international Nestle brands Perrier, San Pellegrino and Acqua Panna.

=== United States ===
In the United States, the various brands are sold in distinct regions of the country. Arrowhead Water is sold in the western United States. Deer Park Spring Water is sold in the Mid-Atlantic United States. Ice Mountain is sold in the midwestern United States. Ozarka is sold in the South Central United States. Poland Spring, founded in 1845, is derived from multiple sources in the state of Maine, including Poland Spring and Garden Spring in Poland, Clear Spring in Hollis, Evergreen Spring in Fryeburg, Spruce Spring in Pierce Pond Township, and White Cedar Spring in Dallas Plantation and it is primarily sold in the northeastern United States. It is the top-selling spring water brand in the United States. Zephyrhills is produced in Zephyrhills, Florida and is sold in the Southeastern United States.

=== Canada ===
Nestlé Waters is currently Canada's largest water bottling company, with two bottling facilities. The larger of the facilities is located in Aberfoyle, Ontario with the second facility located in Hope, British Columbia and warehouses located in Chilliwack, British Columbia and Laval, Quebec.

== Controversy ==
=== Water sourcing ===
Ice Mountain has been part of the Great Lakes water use debate in which diversion of the basin's water for export has been controversial. In 2004, a Michigan court ordered pumping of Sanctuary Springs to cease. After an appellate court overturned the cease and desist, the company and local groups came to an agreement to pump only 218 US gallons (830 L) per minute, which is comparable to other local beverage operations. Nestlé has run into similar local opposition when trying to locate a new source location near the headwaters of the White River in the upper lower peninsula of Michigan.

Several towns in Maine have objected to the business practices of Poland Spring and its parent company Nestlé. In some towns, such as Fryeburg, Maine, Poland Spring actually buys 110 million US gal (420,000 m^{3}) a year from another company, the Fryeburg Water Co., and ships it to the Poland Spring bottling plant in Poland Spring. However, Fryeburg Water Co. also sells water to the town of Fryeburg. The town of Fryeburg began to question the amount of water the company was selling to Poland Spring. In 2004, the town's water delivery system stopped temporarily because of a pump failure, but Poland Spring's operations were able to continue.

The group H_{2}O for ME wants to create a tax on water drawn for commercial purposes, however, Poland Spring said the tax would force the company into bankruptcy. State congressman Jim Wilfong proposed a 20¢ per 1 US gal (3.8 L) tax be allowed to be voted on in a referendum, but the measure was defeated. He also believes that laws should be revised to place limits on the amounts of groundwater landowners can pump out of their land. The town of Sterling, Massachusetts, is attempting to prevent Nestlé from pumping spring water from conservation-restricted town land. Nestlé Waters North America has responded to an RFP issued by the Town of Clinton to purchase the Town of Clinton's Wekepeke aquifer water rights located in Sterling.

In Phoenix, Arizona, residents have been organizing against a proposed bottling plant in the city, though details on the city's contract with Nestlé have not been released to the public.

In Canada, much of the water extracted by the company for its Nestlé Pure Life brand has been at a source in the village of Aberfoyle, Ontario, in Puslinch, Ontario, located in Wellington County, Ontario, and under the jurisdiction of the City of Guelph, Ontario. For some years, a local advocacy group, Wellington Water Watchers, has expressed concern about the amount of groundwater being extracted by the company.

=== False advertising ===
In June 2003, Poland Spring was sued for false advertising in a class action lawsuit charging that their water that supposedly comes from springs is in fact heavily treated common ground water. The suit also states hydro-geologists hired by Nestlé found that another current source for Poland Spring water near the original site stands over a former trash and refuse dump and below an illegal disposal site where human sewage was sprayed as fertilizer for many years. The suit was settled in September 2003 with the company not admitting to the allegations, but agreeing to pay $10 million in charity donations and discounts over the next five years.

In August 2021, BlueTriton was sued by Earth Island Institute, a nonprofit environmental group, which claimed that BlueTriton made misleading claims about sustainability that violated the Consumer Protection Procedures Act, a Washington, DC law designed to prevent "deceptive trade practices." In response, attorneys for BlueTriton filed a motion to dismiss the lawsuit in March 2022, in which they argued that many of the allegedly deceptive statements made by the company constituted "non-actionable puffery" because they were "couched in aspirational terms" and that "BlueTriton's representation of itself as 'a guardian of sustainable resources' and 'a company who, at its core, cares about water'" was "vague and hyperbolic" and therefore could not serve as the basis for a legal claim against the company.
