= Ice Mountain (brand) =

Bottled water brand

Ice Mountain Natural Spring Water

- Country: United States
- Market: Midwestern United States
- Produced by: Primo Brands
- Introduced: 1987; 39 years ago
- Source: Stanwood, Michigan
- Type: Still
- pH: 7.9-8.2
- Bromine (Br): 0.014-0.02
- Calcium (Ca): 45-80
- Chloride (Cl): 1.1-6.6
- Fluoride (F): 0-0.32
- Manganese (Mn): 0
- Magnesium (Mg): 16-31
- Nitrate (NO_{3}): 0
- Potassium (K): 0-1.3
- Sodium (Na): 2.5-6.4
- Sulfate (SO_{4}): 10-16
- TDS: 170-310
- Website: icemountainwater.com
- All concentrations in milligrams per liter (mg/L); pH without units

Ice Mountain is a bottled water brand from Primo Brands, produced and marketed primarily in the Midwest region of the United States. The brand was introduced by PepsiCo in 1987 and sold to Perrier in 1989. Ice Mountain was owned by Nestlé from 1992 to 2021. Since 2002, Ice Mountain has sourced its water from two groundwater wells at Sanctuary Spring in Mecosta County, Michigan, and/or Evart Spring in Evart, Michigan. The water is drawn from underground springs using pump technology. Bottling is done at a plant in Stanwood, Michigan.

== History ==
The origins of the brand date back to 1857, when landowner Dexter Abbott began selling mineral water collected from Moon Tide Spring on Mount Zircon, near Rumford, Maine. The Moon Tide Spring business was closely tied to the more famous Poland Spring, which was owned by relatives of Abbott. Mount Zircon Spring Water was advertised for its claimed health benefits. In January 1987, the Mt. Zircon Company was purchased by Great Spring Waters of America, a newly created subsidiary of PepsiCo. Anheuser-Busch reportedly was planning to buy the company before PepsiCo made a better offer. The Wall Street Journal reported that the company was acquired for "under $10 million" (equivalent to $28 million in 2025). As PepsiCo upgraded the facility and installed new testing equipment, it found that coliform bacteria counts were above acceptable levels and voluntarily recalled some bottles shipped before mid-April 1987. PepsiCo announced on May 12, 1987, that it would begin selling water bottled at Moon Tide Spring under a new brand, Ice Mountain Maine Spring Water, with sales starting in June in four New England cities: Boston, Hartford, New Haven, and Providence.

PepsiCo sold the Ice Mountain brand and operations to the Perrier Group of America on January 24, 1989, placing it under the same ownership as nearby Poland Spring. Bottling operations at Mount Zircon ended after the Perrier acquisition, with Ice Mountain water being trucked to Poland Spring for bottling and distribution. Perrier itself was acquired by Nestlé in 1992, and shortly thereafter, the source of Ice Mountain water was switched from Mount Zircon to Poland Spring. By 1993, the Rumford Falls Times reported that "only a minimal workforce is involved in the loading of trucks from Rumford" and noted with surprise that "Rumford still produces water".

In 1996, Ice Mountain moved its water source to New Tripoli, Pennsylvania, along with Nestlé's Deer Park Spring Water, and bottling operations to a new Perrier plant in nearby Allentown. By 2000, the Ice Mountain brand was predominantly sold in the Midwestern United States, and Nestlé began seeking to move production closer to the market area. The company drilled wells and tested sites in Wisconsin and Michigan in the fall of 2000. The proposals met with opposition from local residents concerned that excessive water extraction could harm the environment, leading to increased regulation of industrial water use in both states. The company announced on May 10, 2002, that it had begun production of Ice Mountain water in Mecosta County, Michigan.

In the early 2000s, Nestlé arranged a corporate sponsorship deal with Six Flags, under which log flumes at Six Flags Great America and Six Flags St. Louis were known as "Ice Mountain® Splash".

== Water sourcing issues ==
Ice Mountain has been part of the Great Lakes water use debate, in which diversion of the basin's primary and secondary water for export has been controversial. In 2004, a Michigan court ordered the pumping of Sanctuary springs to cease. After an appellate court overturned the cease and desist order, the company, and local groups agreed to pump only 218 US gallons (830 L; 182 imp gal) per minute, which is comparable to other local beverage operations. Nestlé (which owned Ice Mountain at the time) ran into similar local opposition when trying to locate a new source location near the headwaters of the White River in the upper lower peninsula of Michigan. In 2017, Nestlé applied for permits to increase production to 400 gallons (US) per minute. In 2019, a Michigan appellate court ruled that Nestle's Ice Mountain bottled water operation was not an essential public service, its bottled water was not a public water supply, and Osceola Township was within its rights to deny the company zoning approval for a new booster pump station to move its water.
