= Vittel (brand) =

French bottled water

- Country: France
- Produced by: Nestlé Waters
- Introduced: 1854; 172 years ago
- Source: Vittel
- Type: still
- pH: 7.5
- Calcium (Ca): 202
- Bicarbonate (HCO_{3}): 402
- Fluoride (F): 0.28
- Magnesium (Mg): 36
- Sodium (Na): 3.8
- Sulfate (SO_{4}): 306
- TDS: 841
- Website: vittel.com
- All concentrations in milligrams per liter (mg/L); pH without units

Vittel (French pronunciation: [vitɛl]) is a French brand of bottled water sold in many countries. Since 1992 it has been owned by the Swiss company Nestlé. It is among the leading French mineral water companies, along with Perrier and Evian.

Vittel is produced using mineral water that is sourced from the "Great Spring" in Vittel, a spa town in the French department of Vosges, and has been bottled and made available for curative and, increasingly, for commercial purposes since 1854.
