= Ozarka =

Spring water brand

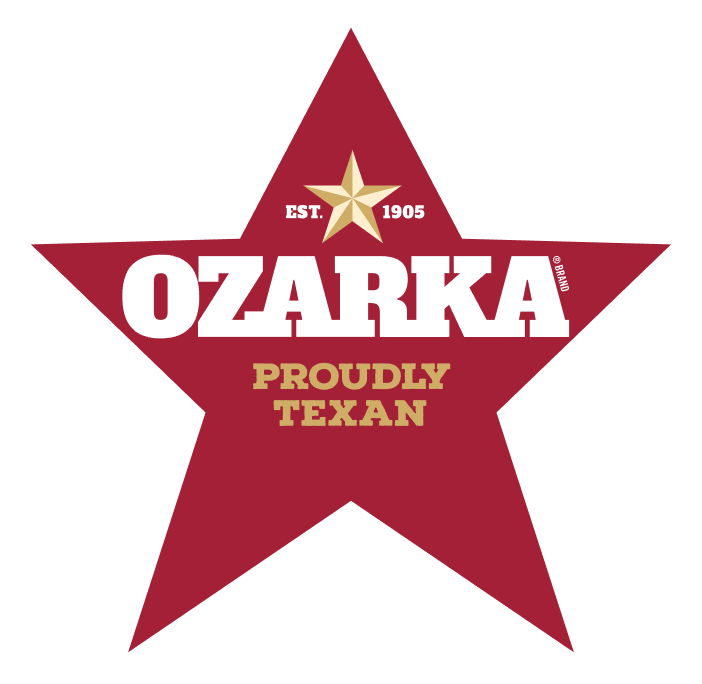
- Market: South Central United States
- Produced by: BlueTriton Brands
- Introduced: 1905; 121 years ago
- Type: Still
- pH: 5.6-6.6
- Bromine (Br): 0.017-0.11
- Calcium (Ca): 1.9-5.9
- Chloride (Cl): 2.6-26
- Fluoride (F): 0
- Magnesium (Mg): 0.85-1.8
- Nitrate (NO_{3}): 0
- Potassium (K): 0-3
- Sodium (Na): 2.4-13
- Sulfate (SO_{4}): 1.9-6.8
- TDS: 30-110
- Website: www.ozarkawater.com
- All concentrations in milligrams per liter (mg/L); pH without units

Ozarka is a brand of spring water which is bottled and sold in the South Central United States, including Arkansas, Texas, Oklahoma, Louisiana, New Mexico, Mississippi, and portions of Tennessee, Kansas and Missouri. The Ozarka Spring Water Company was founded in Eureka Springs, Arkansas in 1905, and was the town's primary source of jobs and economic stability, until it was bought and relocated away from Eureka Springs, leaving the town in economic turmoil. Ozarka is now a division of BlueTriton Brands. Ozarka's slogan is Born Better.

The Ozarka water is selected from natural springs sources in Texas. It is found in Kroger, Walmart, and other retailers in Texas. It is no longer sourced from the Ozark mountain town of Eureka Springs, Arkansas, the mountain range from which it derived its name.

== Legal history ==
In late 20th century, Ozarka had troubles with the Texas state authorities when it drained an aquifer connected to wells owned by the adjacent proprietors, harming them. In ensuing legal actions, the trial court granted summary judgment against landowners who sued the company, relying on common-rule law Houston & Texas Central Railway Co. v. East passed in 1904, which says that "essentially allows, with some limited exceptions, a landowner to pump as much groundwater as the landowner chooses, without liability to neighbors who claim that the pumping has depleted their wells". The court of appeals affirmed the decision.

The case subsequently went all the way to the Supreme Court of Texas, and in May 1999 the court unanimously ruled in Sipriano et al. v. Great Spring Waters of America, Inc. a/k/a Ozarka to not overrule the common-law, while also retaining in Texas the Energy and Water Development Appropriation Bill, passed by Senate in 1997, which aimed at streamlining "the process for creating groundwater conservation districts and to make them more effective in the water management process".

== Gallery ==
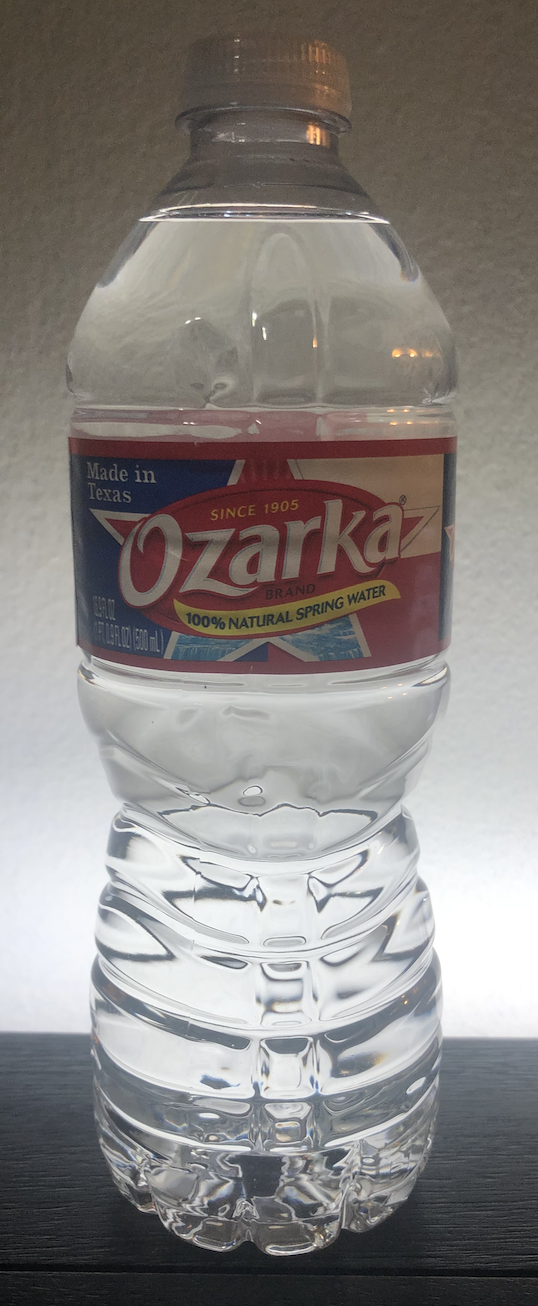
Ozarka water bottle

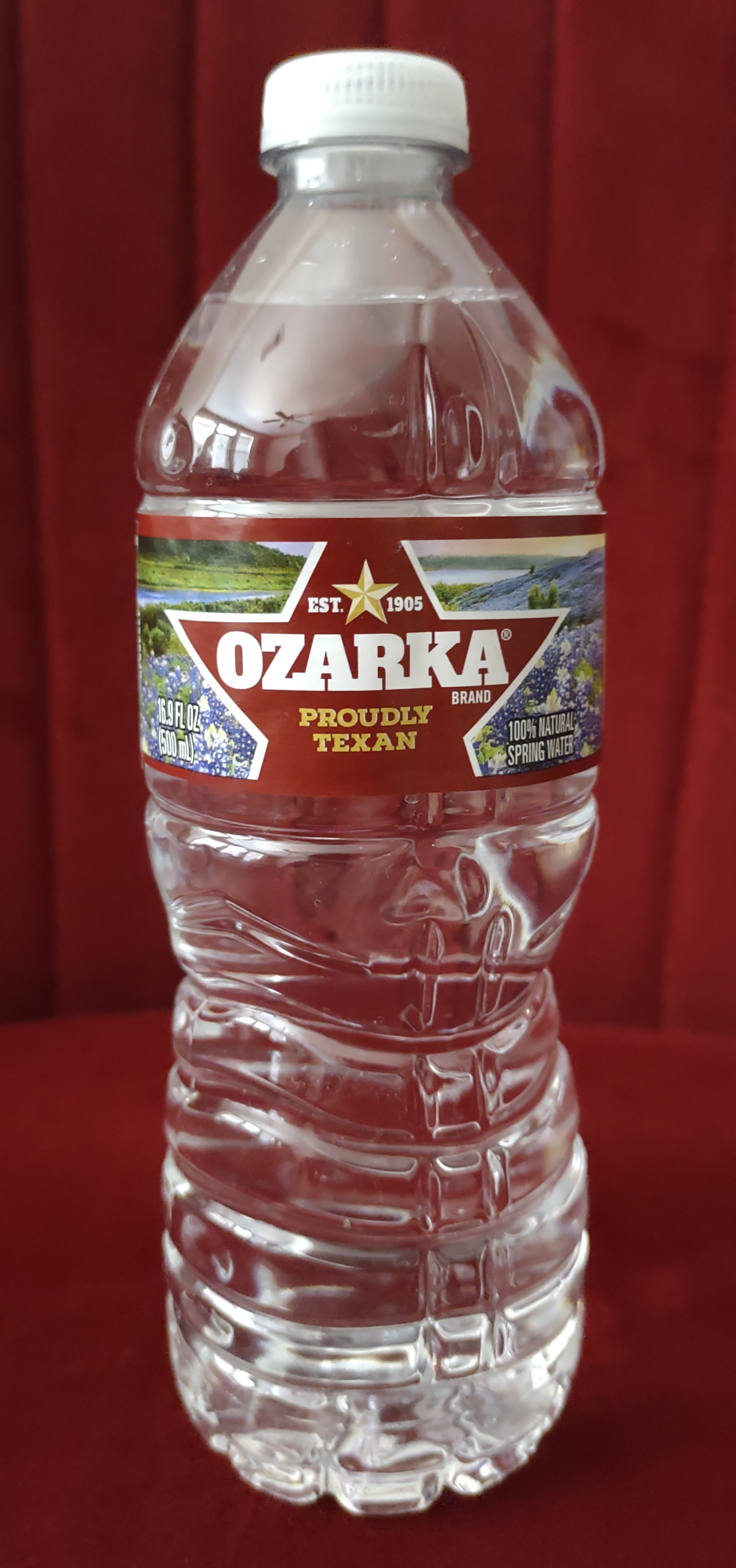
Ozarka water bottle with new/alternate logo and formatting, circa 2022

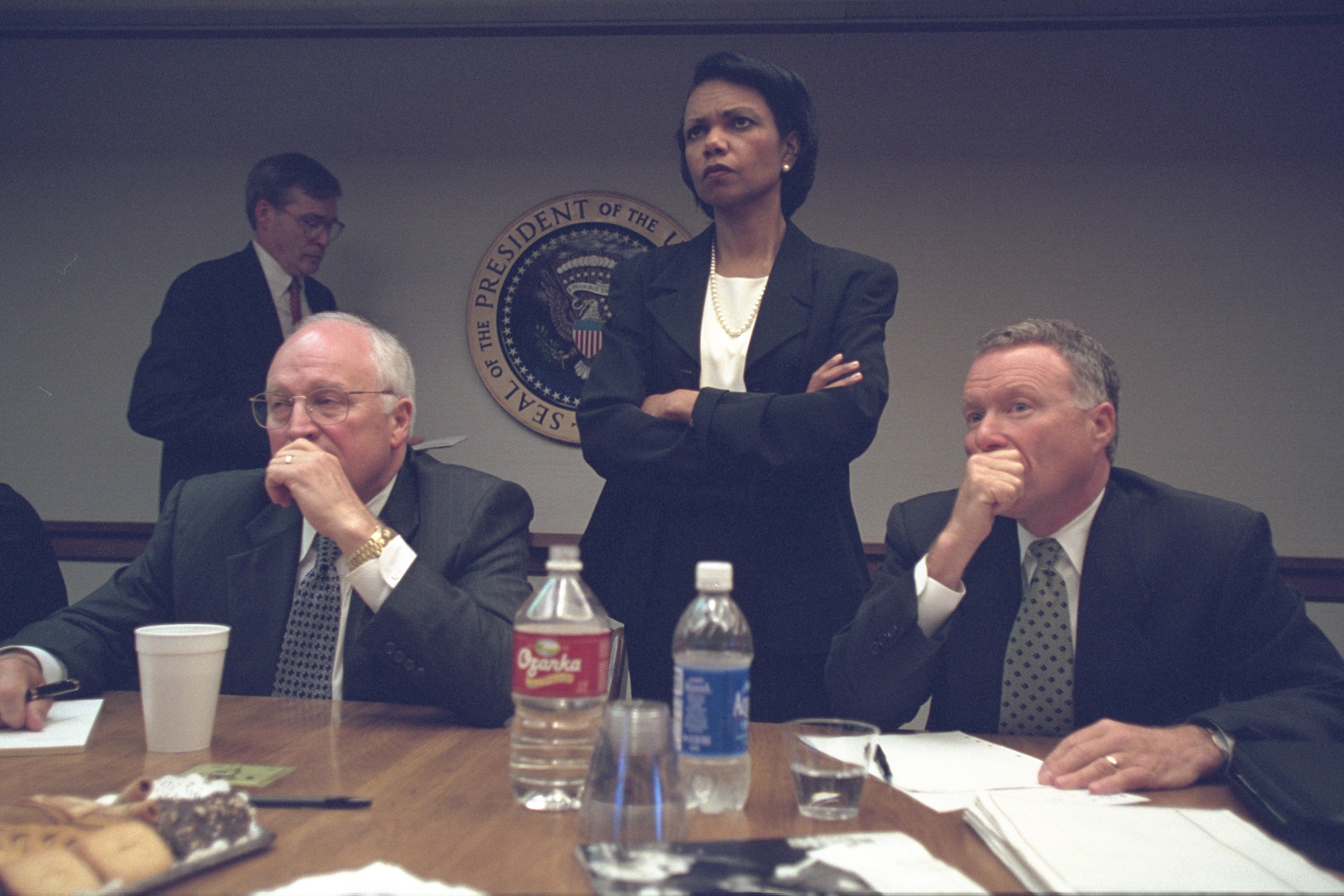
US Vice President Dick Cheney, with National Security Advisor Condoleezza Rice and Chief of Staff Scooter Libby in the Presidential Emergency Operations Center, 2001
