= Peranel =

Bottled water company

Peranel SA
- Type: Private
- Industry: Drink
- Founded: 1992; 34 years ago
- Headquarters: Paris, France
- Area served: Worldwide (excluding United States and Canada)
- Key people: Muriel Lienau (CEO)
- Products: Bottled water
- Number of employees: 31,740 (2015)
- Parent: Nestlé (50%), Platinum Equity (50%)
- Website: https://www.peranel.com/

Peranel is a bottled water business jointly owned by Nestlé and Platinum Equity. Founded in 1992 as the water business of Nestlé, it is responsible for the production and distribution of bottled water worldwide under various brands such as Acqua Panna, San Pellegrino, Perrier, Vittel, Al Manhal and Buxton. The company became Peranel, a joint venture between the two partners, in July 2026.

== History ==
In 1843, Henri Nestlé established his first lemonade and water bottling factory. In 1866, the Nestlé Group was founded.

In 1969: Nestlé acquired a 30% stake in the France-based Société Générale des Eaux Minérales de Vittel.

1974: Acquisition of the German Blaue Quellen group.

1987: Nestlé S.A. takes a majority stake in Vittel and joins with Arrowhead.

1992: Acquisition of the Source Perrier S.A. Source Perrier SA Group. Nestlé becomes the leading player on the world bottled water market, under the name of Nestlé Sources International (NSI).

1996: NSI changes its name to accelerate its international development and becomes: Perrier Vittel S.A.

1998: Take-over of Italy's leading bottled water producer, Sanpellegrino S.p.A. and launch of Nestlé Pure Life, the first multi-site bottled water under the Nestlé Brand.

2000: Simultaneous launch of Nestlé Aquarel, pan-European, multi-site spring water on six markets.

2001: Acquisition by Perrier Vittel of Al Manhal, the leading bottled water company in Saudi Arabia which becomes the leading bottled water player in the Middle East region.

2002: Perrier Vittel becomes Nestlé Waters CEO Leader.

2003: Nestlé Waters acquires the Powwow Group.

2005: Nestlé Waters further develops its business on the African continent via the launch of Nestlé Pure Life in Nigeria and the creation of a partnership in Algeria.

2006: Nestlé Waters acquires the majority shares in Erikli and becomes the Turkish market leader.

2007: Nestlé Waters acquires Sources Minérales Henniez S.A. and becomes the Swiss leader in the bottled water market. Joint venture agreements signed in Mexico and Chile.

2008: Nestlé Pure Life, has become in just a decade the world's leading bottled water brand, with 5 billion liters sold worldwide.

2009: Nestlé Waters strengthens its presence in two key emerging countries: in Brazil by acquiring Àguas de Santa Barbara in the São Paulo region; and in China by acquiring Dashan Drinks, the leading bottled water player in Yunnan Province.

In 2009, a U.S. report entitled "Tour D'Horizon with Nestle: Forget the Global Financial Crisis, the World Is Running out of Fresh Water" involved the departments of agriculture, commerce, energy and environment science and technology as a result of Nestle executives from Switzerland advising of their research. One of the main aspects asserts that a high meat-based diet uses water inefficiently, particularly for an increasing global population. Livestock feed on crops that require high amounts of water such corn and soy. High demand for water overall has already created a drain on underground aquifers and other natural fresh water sources worldwide. Nestle estimates that: “There is not nearly enough fresh water available to provide this standard to a global population expected to exceed 9 billion by mid-century.” The report points out the need to attend to where water is being flowed and asks for greater efficiency in its global delivery.

Also in that same year of 2009, on April 23, during a Nestle Waters shareholders' meeting at the headquarters in Greenwich, Connecticut, a protest group arrived with the campaign of "Think Outside the Bottle" (from Corporate Accountability International, along with representatives from both Michigan Citizens for Water Conservation and Protecting Our Water and Wildlife Resources), claiming Nestle Waters, for the sake of increasing profits, overrode local rights to "community water resources" despite protective opposition. The campaign director Deborah Lapidus said, "These water grabs are having long-lasting impacts on ecosystems and water supplies long held in the public trust." she said. One of the specific cases the organization protested against was regarding when Nestle bypassed a 2006 Shapleigh, Maine, ordinance that aimed to maintain local control over water resources by accessing the law through the state level. Nestle officials responded by giving a progress report on their intentions for transparency with labeling their water sources and locations.

2012: Nestlé Waters establish a distribution agreement with Ambev in Brazil.

2013: Official opening of the new factory in Buxton (United Kingdom), new factory in Pocheon Edong (South Korea) with Pulmuone Waters, acquisition of the Mineral water spring Vale do Sol in Brazil.

2020: Nestlé Waters announced the planned sale of its Canadian water bottling division to Ice River Springs; the latter was expected to take over the Nestlé Pure Life brand and the ReadyRefresh delivery service. The deal required regulatory approval which was not achieved in a timely manner; consequently, Nestle cancelled the deal in early September.

2021: Nestlé announced on 16 February that it had agreed to sell its water brands to One Rock Capital Partners and Metropoulos & Co. The sale, expected to conclude in spring, would include the spring water and mountain brands in Canada and the US, the purified water brand and the delivery service. The plan did not include the Perrier, S.Pellegrino and Acqua Panna brands. In early April 2021, the sale was concluded, with its US operations now operating under the aegis of the private equity-owned firm, BlueTriton Brands.

2024: Nestlé is subject to an investigation of treating/purification of its mineral waters by French prosecutors. French law (based on a European Union directive) prohibits disinfection of mineral water.

2025: Nestle Waters has been fined more than $610,000 by Swiss authorities for having used activated carbon filters on its Henniez bottled mineral water.

2026: Nestlé and Platinum Equity launch Peranel, the former Nestlé Waters business now 50% owned by both companies, to be based in Paris.

== See also ==
- Nestlé Controversies
- Corporate Accountability International
- International Bottled Water Association
- List of Nestlé brands
- Nestlé Pure Life
- BlueTriton Brands
