= Ficus Interfaith =

American artist duo

Ficus Interfaith is an artistic duo based in New York City. Ficus Interfaith is a collaboration between Ryan Bush (b. 1990, Denver, CO) and Raphael Martinez Cohen (b. 1989, New York, NY). Bush and Martinez Cohen have been working together since 2013.

== Education ==
Bush and Martinez Cohen met at the Rhode Island School of Design where they both received BFAs in painting.

== Career ==
=== Exhibitions ===
==== Solo Exhibitions ====
- Zones & Projections, Tower 49 Gallery, 2025-2026
- Furniture Music, P·P·O·W Gallery, NY, 2025
- The Study, Nina Johnson, Miami, FL, 2025
- Chabudai, Chabudai, Numanohashi, in Tokyo, Japan, 2024
- Los Angeles Bar, In Lieu Gallery, Los Angeles, CA, 2024
- Grand Central Treehouse, at Deli Gallery, NY, 2023
- Ficus Interfaith, Jack Chiles, New York, NY, 2019
- Frame House Whereabouts, Interstate Projects, Brooklyn, NY, 2018
- Summer Terrazzos, Prairie, Chicago, IL, 2018
- Flower Bat Mullion, From The Desk of Lucy Bull, Los Angeles, CA, 2018
- Ficus Interfaith, Gern En Regalia, Ridgewood, NY, 2017

==== Selected Group Exhibitions ====
- Retrospective, Prairie, Chicago, IL, 2026
- N24B, Alyssa Davis Gallery, New York, NY
- The Summit Show, Mundus Press, Hadley, MA, 2025
- Lavender Bloom, BOFFO Benefit, Kurimanzutto, New York, NY, 2025
- On A Comfortable Sofa Dreamed, Superhouse, New York, NY, 2025
- The Loving Cup, Jacqueline Sullivan Gallery, New York, NY, 2025
- "Objects for a Heavenly Cave"- Marta, Los Angeles, CA, 2024
- "Residual Energies" - Nina Johnson Gallery, Miami, Fl 2024
- "Los Angeles Bar" - "Second Pour," In Lieu, Los Angeles, 2024
- Local Objects, International Objects, New York, NY, 2023
- Frieze LA, In Lieu Gallery, Los Angeles, CO, 2022
- From Cellar to Garret, South Parade, London, 2020-2021
- Theorem X, Rachel Uffner Gallery, New York, 2021
- Red Root, Green Root, The Valley, Taos, New Mexico 2021
- Dear John, Adams and Ollman, Portland, 2021
- No Place, P.P.O.W. Gallery, New York, 2020
- In Practice: Total Disbelief, SculptureCenter, NY, 2020
- Rubus Armeniacus (Himalayan blackberry), Jessica’s Apartment, New York, NY, 2019
- Downturn, Sibling, Toronto, Canada, 2019
- The Nourishment, From The Desk of Lucy Bull, Los Angeles, CA, 2019
- RESET, Kai Matsumiya, New York, NY, 2019
- At the End of the Game You Will Be Forgotten, Alyssa Davis Gallery, New York, NY, 2018
- The Earth is a Trampled Garden, Brooklyn, NY, 2018
- Dangerous Together, Prairie, Chicago, IL, 2018
- Progress Beyond Reason, MX Gallery, New York, NY, 2017
- dccon1: narrabantur, U.S. Blues, Brooklyn, NY, 2016

=== Residencies ===
- Salmon Creek Farm, Albion, CA 2024
- Numanohashi, A Tokyo, Japan 2024
- Clay Club, Sculpture Center, Queens, NY, 2018
- Artists in Residence, Shandaken Projects: Storm King, New Windsor, NY, 2018
- Artists in Residence, 2727 California Street, Berkeley, CA, 2018

=== Selected Commissions ===
- Sealife Table, Private Residence, New York, NY, 2022
- Icarus Medallion, Private Residence, Los Angeles, CA, 2023
- Fountain of Sargasso, Private Residence, Los Angeles, CA, 2023
- Bee Table, Private Residence, New York, NY, 2024
- Brooklyn Wildflowers Table, Private Residence, Brooklyn, NY 2025
- Wing On Wo, 26 Mott Street, New York, NY, 2025
- Frenchette Bakery, 174 Mott Street, New York, NY, 2026

=== Special Projects ===
- Pearl Buoy, a watch created for Swiss Institute's TimeForArt Auction with Maurice Lacroix, 2026

== Style and technique ==
In the mid-2010s, Ficus Interfaith began working with terrazzo, a cementitious composite material, usually used in flooring. Ficus Interfaith's sculptures explore the creative possibilities of the terrazzo technique which is more commonly found in public or municipal spaces. In addition to their free standing and wall-mounted terrazzo sculptures, Ficus Interfaith make site-specific terrazzo installations. Ficus Interfaith use typical and atypical materials in their terrazzo including but not limited to peach stones, oyster shells, the royal blue glass of Saratoga Water bottles, petrified wood, marbles, pits, deer bones, and walnuts.

Since December 8, 2014, Ficus Interfaith has maintained a WordPress blog titled My Brothers Garden.

The name Ficus Interfaith comes from the "fig tree genus and the allure of spirituality."

Ficus Interfaith work out of a studio in Queens, NYC. For Bush and Martinez Cohen, the Ficus Interfaith entity functions as a third distinct voice. In a December 2023 interview with ARTnews, Ficus Interfaith stated "most of our pieces operate as paintings."

Ficus Interfaith's art is informed by their formal training in painting. Ficus Interfaith credit many inspirations including: material culture, traditional knowledge, craft objects, Rhizofiltration, SpongeBob, The Timeless Way of Building, Rockwell Kent, homosocial behavior, and Pinocchio.
