= Saratoga Water =

Brand of bottled water

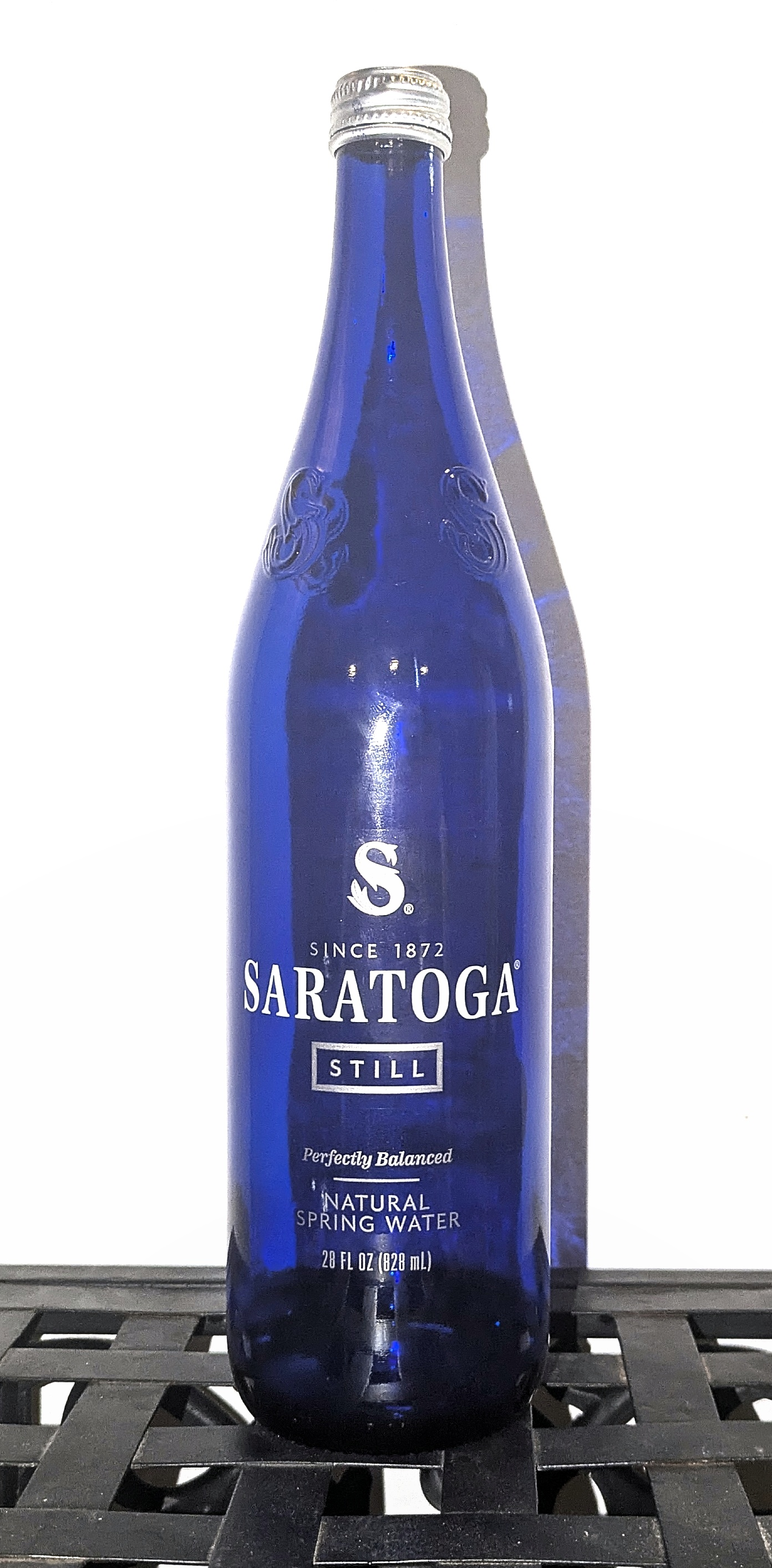
- 28 oz. stillwater bottle
- Type: Water beverage
- Manufacturer: BlueTriton Brands
- Origin: United States
- Introduced: February 1872; 154 years ago

Saratoga Water, also known as Saratoga Spring Water and Saratoga, is a bottled-water company founded in 1872 in Saratoga Springs, New York. Saratoga Spring Water is sold in sparkling and still versions in a cobalt-blue bottle. Saratoga Water is a brand of BlueTriton Brands.

== History ==
Saratoga water from the famous springs in New York was being bottled and sold prior to the American Civil War but experienced a boost in popularity after the war. In 1872 a group of Saratoga-based businessmen looking to take advantage of Saratoga’s famous healing waters began bottling a newly discovered spring under the name “Saratoga Vichy,” named after the mineral springs of Vichy, France.

In 1903, the French Republic sued the Saratoga Water company in French Republic v. Saratoga Vichy Spring Co., over the use of the Vichy name. The court ruled on behalf of the American company.

In the mid-1980s, Saratoga Water was bought by Anheuser-Busch. Evian bought the company from Anheuser-Busch. Evian shut down the local bottling plant. In 1992, a group of local investors purchased the company and re-opened the plant. In 2021, the brand was sold to BlueTriton Brands.

In a 2023 New York Times Magazine article titled "The Make-Do Joys of Terrazzo", artist duo Ficus Interfaith describe using the royal blue glass of Saratoga Water bottles as one of the materials they use to make their terrazzo art works.

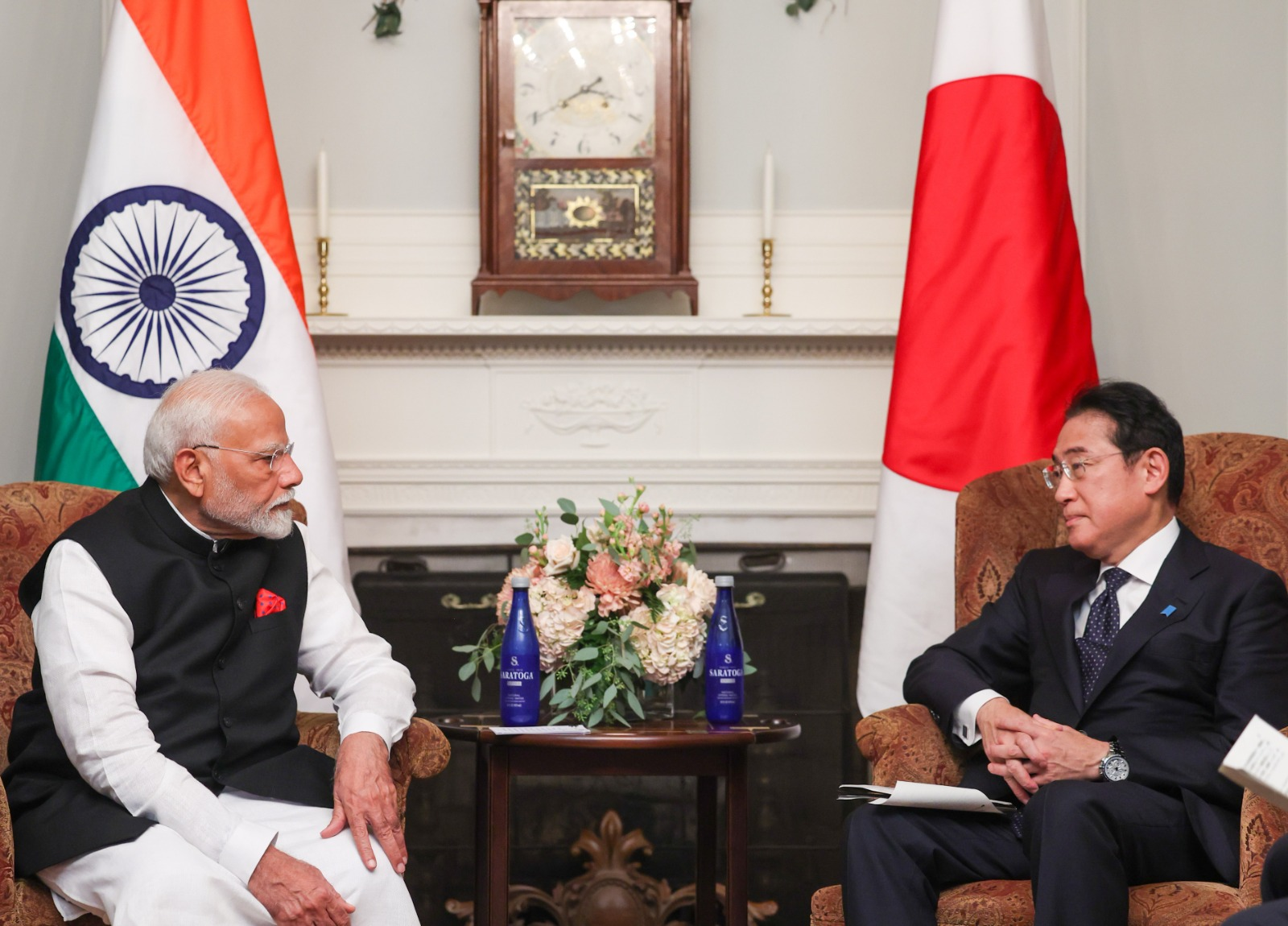
Prime Minister of India Narendra Modi and then Prime Minister of Japan Fumio Kishida with bottles of Saratoga water in September 2024

In 2024, Saratoga Water launched a line of aluminum bottles. Packaging is among several of the company growth priorities, according to CEO Joey Bergstein.

In 2025, the brand went viral online after social media influencer Ashton Hall featured the water in his “Morning Routine” videos.
