= Zephyrhills (brand) =

Spring water brand

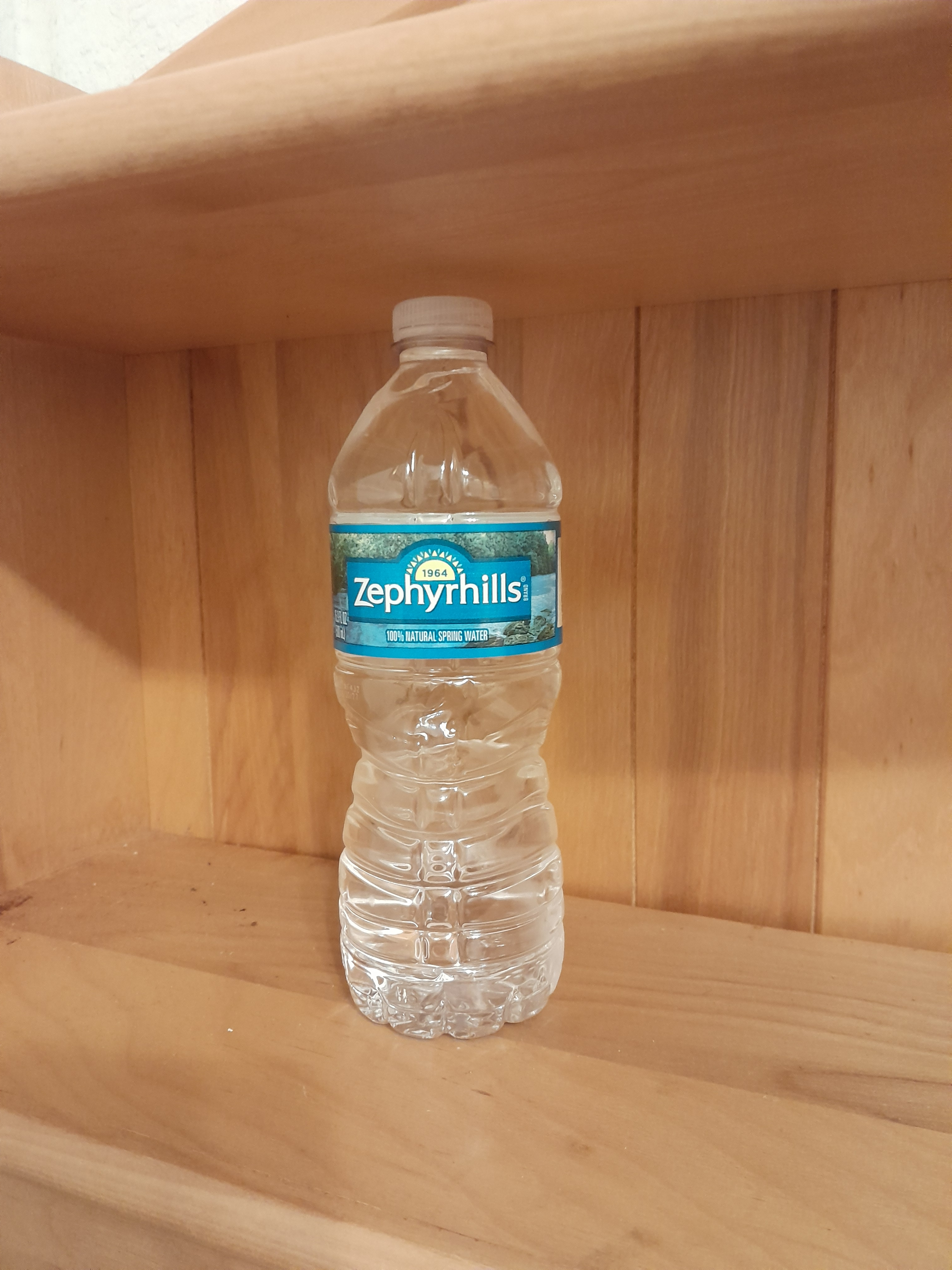
- Zephyrhills water bottle
- Market: Florida
- Produced by: BlueTriton Brands
- Introduced: 1957; 69 years ago
- Website: www.zephyrhillswater.com
- All concentrations in milligrams per liter (mg/L); pH without units

Zephyrhills is a brand of spring water sold regionally in the United States by BlueTriton Brands. It is sourced from Crystal Springs, located near Crystal Springs and Zephyrhills, Florida. As well as Cypress Springs, the water is sourced from Blue Springs, White Springs, and Spring of Life in Lake County, Florida. Its headquarters is located in Zephyrhills, Florida.

== History ==
Zephyrhills Spring Water Company was started in 1957 by Don Robinson, and he launched the brand name 1964.

== Acquisitions ==
In the company's history, it has been acquired twice, once in 1987 by Nestlé through the company Perrier and again in 2021 when Nestlé sold the company to a variety of investment firms including One Rock Capital Partners and Metropoulos & Co.
