= Nestlé Pure Life =

Brand created by Nestlé

- Market: Worldwide
- Produced by: Nestlé Waters (Globally); BlueTriton Brands (North America)
- Introduced: 1998; 28 years ago
- Tagline: "A healthy, active lifestyle starts with staying well hydrated with Nestlé Pure Life Purified Water."
- Source: Aberfoyle, Ontario, Erin, Ontario, and Hope, British Columbia, Canada
- Website: nestlepurelife.com
- All concentrations in milligrams per liter (mg/L); pH without units

Nestlé Pure Life is a brand of bottled water from Nestlé Waters globally and licensed to BlueTriton Brands in North America. The brand was first established in 1998 in Pakistan and is now available in 21 countries in Asia, the Americas, Africa, and Europe. In early April 2021, the sale of Nestlé Waters North America's bottling operations, including Nestlé Pure Life, to One Rock Capital Partners LLC and Metropoulos & Co. was concluded.

== History ==
Nestlé Pure Life was first launched in 1998 in Pakistan, and started being sold in Europe in 2000.

=== Pakistan ===
The first critical report on Nestlé Pure Life's negative impact on environment and the enjoyment of the human right to water in Pakistan was authored by human rights advocate Nils Rosemann and published by Actionaid Pakistan and Swiss Coalition of Development Organisations in 2005. A report in 2006 called for stronger regulation of and adherence by Nestlé Water to existing regulations and to be accountable to its social and environmental commitments. Notwithstanding numerous press statements by Nestlé an audit report ordered by the Supreme Court of Pakistan found that Nestlé Water extracts water without any costs, and the Supreme Court "termed the margins of distributors and retailers ‘very high’ and ‘unjustified’ as compared to the private company’s profit".

=== North America ===
Nestlé Pure Life began being sold in the North America in 2002 when Aberfoyle Springs branded water, which brand and facilities Nestlé bought in 2000, was rebranded as Nestlé Pure Life Aberfoyle and later Nestlé Pure Life Natural Spring Water. Aberfoyle Springs was first established in 1993. Nestlé also began to bottle Montclair branded water at the facilities. As of mid 2020, the water extracted by Nestlé Canada was from a source in Aberfoyle, Ontario, a well in Erin, Ontario and another in Hope, British Columbia. The company also owned a well in Elora, Ontario which had yet to be tapped. On 3 July 2020, Nestlé Canada announced that it had agreed to sell its water bottling business to Ice River Springs, of Shelburne, Ontario. The latter would acquire the source and bottling operations in Aberfoyle, Ontario and in Hope, British Columbia, and a well in Erin, Ontario. The announcement came after the Government of Ontario announced plans that would allow municipalities greater power to veto new bottling plants and to set new restrictions on removing groundwater. Nestlé, however, stated that its plans to sell the water bottling business was already in the planning stages in 2019. Ice River was expected to take over the Pure Life brand and the ReadyRefresh delivery service. The deal was awaiting regulator approval which was not achieved in a timely manner leading Nestlé to cancel the deal in early September 2020.

On 16 February 2021, Nestlé announced that it had agreed to sell most of its water brands in North America to One Rock Capital Partners and Metropoulos & Co, creating BlueTriton Brands. The sale, which concluded in early April, included the spring water and mountain brands, including the North America assets of Pure Life, the purified water brand and the delivery service. The deal did not include the Perrier, S.Pellegrino and Acqua Panna brands.

== Production and distribution ==
In Canada, Nestlé has two bottling facilities that produce Nestlé Pure Life branded water. The larger of the two facilities is located in Aberfoyle, Ontario and the smaller one is in Hope, BC. Warehouses are located in Chilliwack, British Columbia, Hamilton, Ontario and Laval, Quebec. Nestlé Pure Life water is sold in North America, South America, Europe, Asia, including the Middle East, and Africa. In South Africa, Nestlé Pure Life is produced by Clover Waters.

== Controversy ==
Nestlé has been criticized for bottling water in poor regions like South America, which could drain natural water sources and deprive people who are unable to afford the expensive bottled water. The movie Bottled Life documented the situation and won several film awards.

In Canada, much of the water extracted by the company for its Pure Life brand has been at a source in the village of Aberfoyle, Ontario in Puslinch, Ontario, located in Wellington County, Ontario and under the jurisdiction of the City of Guelph, Ontario. For some years, the local advocacy group Wellington Water Watchers (formed in 2007) has expressed concern about the amount of water being extracted by the company. After the planned sale of Nestlé Canada's water bottling business to Ice River Springs was announced in early July 2020, Wellington Water Watchers said that this was "a victory for the people of Ontario ... a response by Nestle to public pressure". In a later statement, however, a spokesperson said that Ontario should be phasing out the bottled water industry, a "low priority and frivolous use of the water taking".

Nearly a year earlier (July 2019), the Wellington group had demanded that the provincial government obtain an environmental assessment before renewing the company's licence to remove any groundwater. (Water taking is controlled by the Ontario Ministry of the Environment, Conservation and Parks.) At the time, Nestlé's permit to extract up to 3.6 million litres of water per day was close to coming up for renewal. The most recent study (reported in March 2020) by the City of Guelph about the Aberfoyle source included this comment: Nestlé's water-taking "has not caused a decline or drop in water levels year after year" and that "water-taking at the current rate is sustainable at this point in time".

== See also ==
- Dasani
- Aquafina
- Poland Spring
- Pulmuone
