= Ice River Springs =

Bottled water company

- Industry: Beverage
- Founded: 1995
- Headquarters: Shelburne, Ontario, Canada
- Products: Bottled water, Ice River Green
- Website: iceriversprings.com

Ice River Springs is a private label bottled water producer for retailers and food service operators and manufacturer of the Ice River Green brand of bottled water. The company runs a plastic recycling operation, Blue Mountain Plastics (BMP), that takes bottles collected by municipalities and produces food grade recycled PETE for its water bottles. As of 2020, the company was headquartered in Shelburne, Ontario. The recycling facility was also located in Shelburne and its nearest bottling plant was in Feversham, Ontario, 40 km away. Its operations included locations across Canada and the Ice River Hialeah Gardens subsidiary in Florida, USA.

The company is owned and managed by the Gott family. The company planned to expand significantly in 2020 by purchasing the bottling operations of Nestlé Waters Canada. The deal required regulatory approval which was not achieved in a timely manner; consequently, Nestlé cancelled the deal in early September.

== Company history ==
The company was started in 1995 in Feversham, with a small bottling operation at the spring that fed a trout farm owned by the Gotts. In 2017, the company said that it had "13 bottling plants in Canada and the U.S., each with their own sources of water". The company also markets demineralized water and distilled water. A May 2017 news item indicated that the company had 600 employees".

A press release in July 2020 provided these specifics of the company's business at that time: "a Canadian family-owned, private-label bottled water producer for retailers and manufacturer of the Ice River Green brand of bottled water". The company also runs a plastics recycling operation, BMP Recycling, that "takes municipal blue box waste and turns it into food-grade plastic, including 100 per cent recycled bottles".

As of July 2020, the Ice River web site listed these operations:

Ice River (Head Office) and BMP Recycling Shelburne, ON; Ice River Feversham, ON; Ice River Amaranth, ON; Ice River Grafton, ON; Ice River Calgary, AB; Ice River Lachute, QC; Ice River Chilliwack, BC; and Ice River Hialeah Gardens, Florida, USA. The US operation was incorporated in May 2017 and had offices at 10701 NW 140th St. in Hialeah.

=== Attempted purchase of Nestlé bottling operations ===
On 3 July 2020, Nestlé Canada announced that it had agreed to sell its water bottling business to Ice River Springs. The latter would acquire the source and bottling operations of Nestlé Waters North America in the village of Aberfoyle in Puslinch, Ontario and in Hope, British Columbia and a well in Erin, Ontario. (In 2017, Nestlé was exctracting 190,000 bottles per day of water from the Erin well.) The deal includes a Nestlé owned well in Elora, Ontario which has yet to be tapped.

The announcement came after the Province of Ontario was planning to allow municipalities greater power to veto new bottling plants and to set new restrictions on removing groundwater. Nestlé, however, stated that its intent to sell the water bottling business was already under consideration in late 2019. Ice River was expected to take over the Nestlé Pure Life brand and the ReadyRefresh delivery service. The deal could not proceed until approval by regulators, expected to happen by the third quarter of 2020.

The plan to acquire the Nestlé business was part of Ice River's "ambition to expand beyond its private label business for retailers".

The regulatory approval of the planned purchase was not achieved in a timely manner, "within Nestlé’s set time frame". That led to cancellation of the deal in early September 2020.

== Environmental issues ==
The company is committed to reducing energy consumption, recycling plastic and minimizing its carbon footprint. In 2011 they opened PET bottle recycling operation producing bottles made from recycled plastics that can be recycled in an endless "closed loop". In 2014 the company launched the Ice River Green brand of bottled water in order to utilize the recycled green, food-grade, PET plastic that might otherwise be downcycled. The recycling initiative was recognized with a DuPont Packaging Award in 2014. Levels of PET bottle recycling were 31.2% in North America according to a report from The National Association for PET Container Resources (NAPCOR) and The Association of Postconsumer Plastic Recyclers (APR).

A November 2019 report by the CBC stated that company "estimates it uses 80 to 85 per cent of the PET plastic collected by recycling programs in Ontario (along with some collected in the northern U.S)". A Cape Breton news report in September 2019 stated that much of the Sobeys Compliments brand bottled water was produced by Ice River Springs, "which employs a 'closed-loop recycling' process [converting plastic waste into PET that is used to make the bottles] that it claims saves 23 million liters of water per year". The closed-loop approach also produces 78% less greenhouse gas and an energy savings of 36,000 Mwh compared to making plastic bottles from conventional sources.

In 2019, the Blue Mountain Plastics subsidiary used 29,000 tonnes of plastic from municipal recycling programmes.

In 2017, Ice River Springs said their license allowed for extracting 4.6 million litres a day at Feversham but it was taking under 900 million litres per year from the spring on Gott family property.

== Water-taking controversy ==
In Canada, much of the spring water extracted by Nestlé for its Pure Life brand, to be acquired by Ice River Springs, has been at a source in the village of Aberfoyle located in Wellington County, Ontario. For some years, a local advocacy group, Wellington Water Watchers has expressed concern about the amount of groundwater being extracted at this location. Formed in 2007, the group's mandate is "the protection, restoration and conservation of drinking water in Guelph and Wellington County".

After the planned purchase of the Nestlé water bottling business by Ice River Springs was announced in July 2020, Wellington Water Watchers said that this was "a victory for the people of Ontario ... a response by Nestle to public pressure". In a later statement, however, a spokesperson said that Ontario should be phasing out the bottled water industry, a "low priority and frivolous use of the water taking". The Wellington Group subsequently discussed the planned purchase by Ice River Springs with a reporter. The news item on 6 July stated: "Same water, different bottle: water advocates react to Nestlé sale" ... "It doesn’t solve the problem at all".

In July 2019, the Wellington group had demanded that the provincial government obtain an environmental assessment before renewing the company's licence to remove any groundwater. (Water-taking is controlled by the Ontario Ministry of the Environment, Conservation and Parks.) Nestlé’s permit allowed for the extraction of up to 3.6 million litres of water per day.

The most recent study (reported in March 2020) by the nearest city, Guelph, about the Aberfoyle (Puslinch) well to be acquired by Ice River Springs included this comment. Nestlé’s extraction of water "has not caused a decline or drop in water levels year after year" and "water-taking at the current rate is sustainable at this point in time". In May 2020, the Grand River Source Water Protection Committee and Centre Wellington a township next to the Middlebrook well in Elora announced that "private permits to take water do not have a major impact on municipal water levels, because they are usually too far from municipal wells".
