= Pulmuone =

South Korean company food company

Pulmone
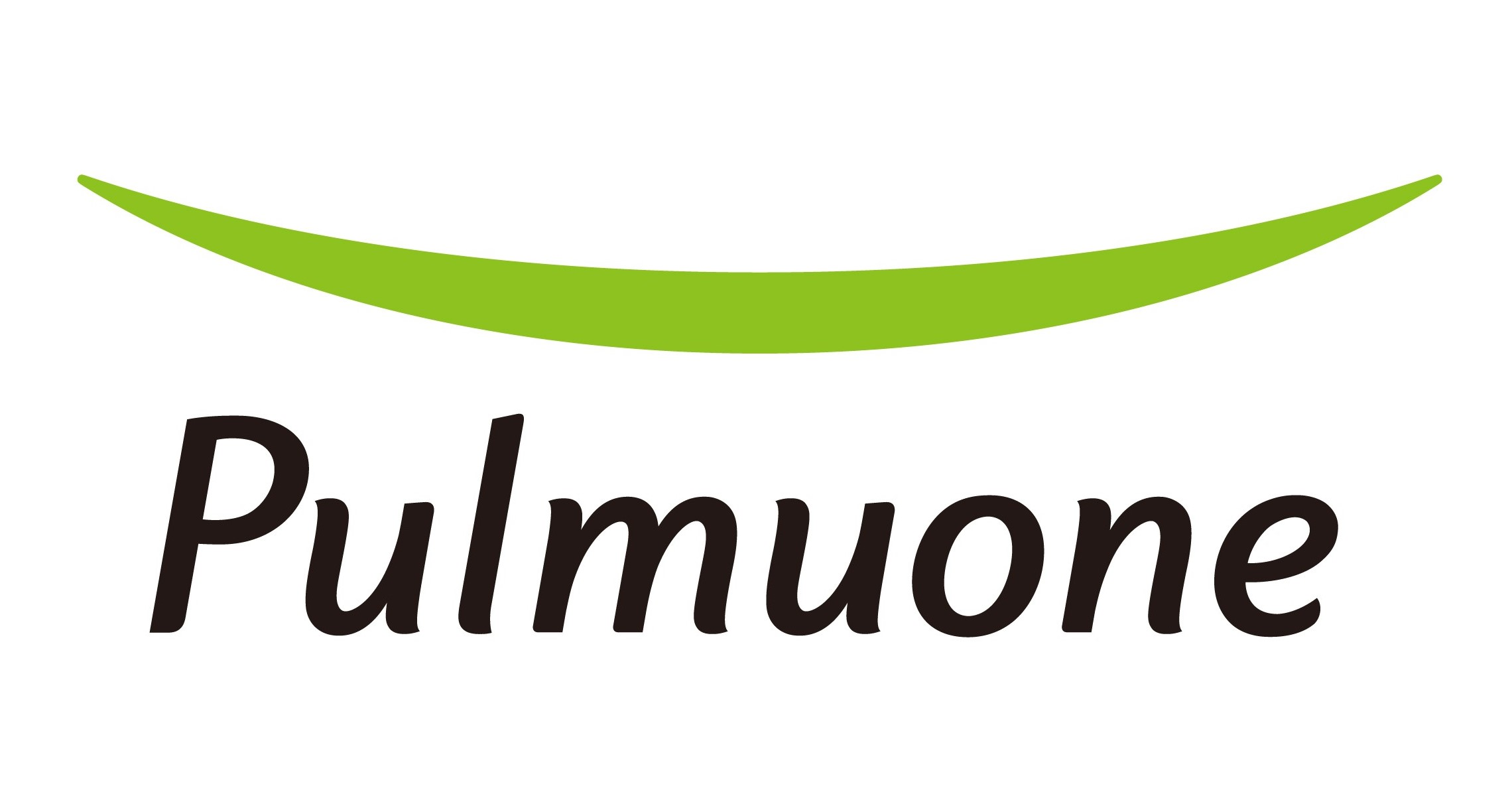
- Company type: Public
- Industry: Food
- Founded: May 1981; 44 years ago
- Headquarters: Seoul, South Korea
- Products: Plant-based foods
- Website: pulmuone.co.kr

Pulmuone Co., Ltd. (Korean: 풀무원) (KRX: 017810) is a South Korean company that produces plant-based foods such as tofu and soybean sprouts. It was founded in 1981, is based in Seoul, South Korea and sells its products both within Korea as well as internationally. The company provided major funding for the establishment of the Kimchi Field Museum in Seoul in 1986.

== History ==
The company was founded by Won Kyung Sun as a small vegetable store. There is a subsidiary in the United States, called Pulmuone Foods USA, with offices in Fullerton, California, Gilroy, California, and Tappan, New York.

In 2016, the company acquired Vitasoy USA, which included Nasoya Foods, Inc. Nasoya was founded in Leominster, Massachusetts in 1977 and produces tofu.

As of 2019, Pulmuone produces pet food for Amio Organic Senior, Organic Farmer's Dut, Skin & Beauty, Slim Up, Organic Farmer's Puff, Supermilk, Legacy Chicken, and Calcium Chicken Chest.

In 2021, Pulmuone declared a "specialized vegetable food company". It plans to minimize the use of meat for the global environment and provide food that uses only vegetable ingredients. Pulmuone has been running the PPM division since 2020, a research division dedicated to plant proteins. Based on this, it will establish a three-stage mid- to long-term road map by 2023 to introduce plant-oriented new products sequentially.

In addition, Pulmuone's overseas subsidiaries have established roadmaps to release vegetable-oriented products. Pulmuone USA, a U.S. corporation, is the market leader with the largest market share in the U.S. tofu market (75%).

Following Pulmuone LOHAS Market ORGA Wholefood's Bangi branch, a total of four stores, including ORGA Banpo Branch, By ORGA Ahyeon New Town Branch, Jeju English Village Branch and Jeju Island Branch, have been newly designated as "green specialty stores." Green specialty stores are green stores designated by the Korean government's Ministry of Environment that minimize the use of plastic containers and plastic bags.

In 2021, it won the 15th Korea Packaging Contest, an eco-friendly salad container.

Pulmuone signed a business agreement with the preparatory planning team for the 2021 P4G summit in South Korea to promote mutual public relations cooperation.

== Products ==
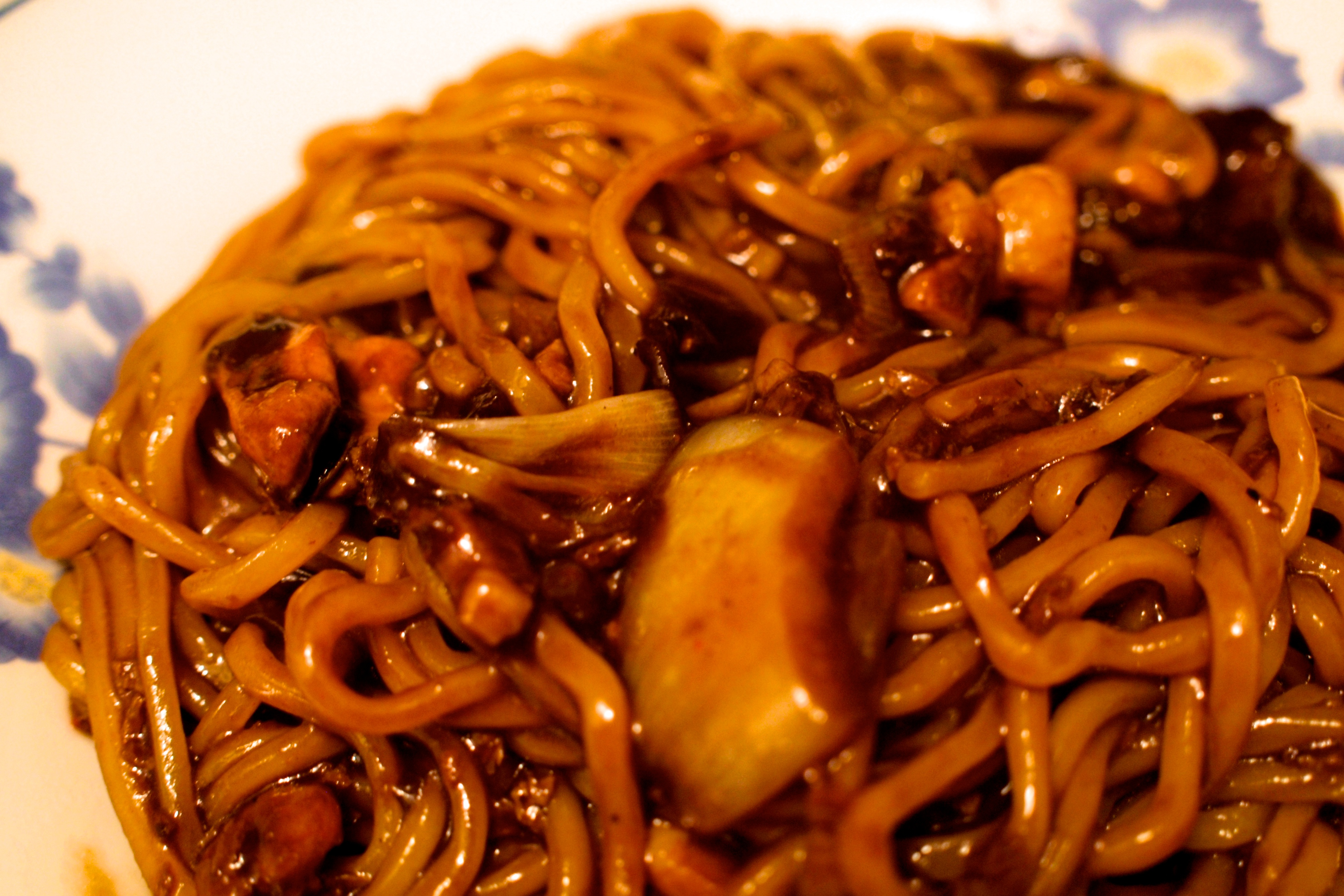
Pulmuone Jikwa-jjajang

The company sells products under the brand names Pulmuone, Chan-ma-ru, Saeng-ga-deuck, and Soga. In addition to soybean products, it also sells fresh noodles, dumplings, eggs, kimchi, mushrooms, laver, pastes and sauces, desserts, frozen foods, soups, and juices.

Tofu-myeon KIT (packaged product with sauce that can be mixed with tofu noodles), cube tofu, and tofu bar, which are home-style snacks that replace flour, were released. The cumulative sales of tofu noodles surpassed 5 million in just one year since its launch. It has become popular with consumers who want to cut down on carbohydrates. Pulmuone has also expanded its tofu noodle production line.

Pulmuone introduced a vegetable meat product that emphasized the texture of meat for the first time. Other alternative meat products include tofu tender, which replaces chicken, and tofu crumble rice sauce.

The company quickly jumped to second place in sales by introducing the thinnest dumpling on the market.

Pulmuone Foods challenged the ramen market with 'Nature is Delicious' in 2011 and failed. However, Pulmuone, which challenged the ramen market again, released unfried ramen and sold more than 10 million bags in March 2020.

It released a new product with Barilla, an Italian pasta brand.

It's Protein, a protein drink, sold more than 1 million bottles in just three months. The product contains 15g of protein based on a bottle of 260ml product and 400 mg of calcium, or 57% of the daily nutrients.

Pulmuone entered the baby food market by releasing 12 types of baby food that can be stored at room temperature.

Plant-based Activia is a vegan-certified alternative yogurt made from coconut instead of milk.

Pulmuone introduced a high-protein tofu product that makes it easy to enjoy representative vegetable protein food tofu.

== Sales ==
It recorded 2.31 trillion KRW in sales and 45.9 billion KRW in operating profit in 2020. Although its sales decreased by 2.9%, its operating profit grew by 50% at 45.9 billion KRW. Net profit was 14.3 billion KRW of deficit in 2019 but it shifted to $7.5 billion to surplus in 2020.
