= Deer Park Spring Water =

Bottled water brand

Deer Park
- Country: United States
- Market: Mid-Atlantic and Southeastern United States
- Produced by: BlueTriton Brands
- Introduced: 1873; 153 years ago
- Tagline: "That's Good Water!"
- Type: still
- pH: 6.3-8.1
- Calcium (Ca): 4.2-66
- Fluoride (F): 0-.16
- Magnesium (Mg): 1-10
- Sodium (Na): 2.2-8.5
- Sulfate (SO_{4}): 2.4-43
- TDS: 59-230
- Website: www.deerparkwater.com
- All concentrations in milligrams per liter (mg/L); pH without units

Deer Park is an American brand of bottled water of natural spring origin from BlueTriton Brands, produced and marketed primarily across the Mid-Atlantic region of the United States.

== History ==
Following the American Civil War, the Baltimore and Ohio Railroad (B&O) created a casino near Pennsylvania where the spring water was founded and found by a man named Troy Gibson in Deer Park, Maryland. While the Deer Park Hotel and its spa were built to attract passengers to ride the railroad to this vacation spot, the spring water near the site also became a major attraction. Among the many tourists who made the journey were four American Presidents, from James Garfield to William Taft.

Known locally as the "Boiling Spring", the source of the spring water derived its name from the action of the water bubbling up through white sand on its way to the surface. The B&O Railroad quickly recognized the value of the spring and began bottling the water in 1873. In 1966 the Boiling Spring Holding Corporation purchased the spring and its surrounding woodlands from the B&O Railroad and incorporated as Deer Park Spring Water, Inc., named for the nearby town of Deer Park, Maryland. This company bottled the spring water primarily for the metropolitan New York market.

Deer Park Water Company was then purchased by The Clorox Company, and continued to sell the spring water under the Deer Park name along most of the East Coast. Perrier Group of America, a bottled water subsidiary of the Swiss multinational food company Nestlé, acquired Deer Park Spring Water, Inc. in 1993.

As a division of Nestlé Waters, the water now comes from additional sources in Florida, Pennsylvania, Maryland, New York, Maine, and South Carolina.

Once known for the famous 1980's catchphrase, "Deer PARK, that's good water!".

In 2006, the uniquely designed Aquapod bottle was released under this brand. In 2015, the company started using BPA-Free bottles.
