= Acqua Panna =

Brand of bottled water

- Country: Italy
- Produced by: Nestlé Waters
- Introduced: 1880; 146 years ago
- Source: Acqua Panna, Tuscany, Italy
- Type: Mineral water
- pH: 8.2
- Calcium (Ca): 30.
- Chloride (Cl): 7.1
- Bicarbonate (HCO_{3}): 100
- Fluoride (F): 0.1
- Magnesium (Mg): 6.9
- Nitrate (NO_{3}): 5.7
- Potassium (K): 0.9
- Silica (SiO_{2}): 8.2
- Sodium (Na): 6.5
- Strontium (Sr): 0.2
- Sulfate (SO_{4}): 21.4
- TDS: 143 (at 180º C)
- Website: acquapanna.com
- All concentrations in milligrams per liter (mg/L); pH without units

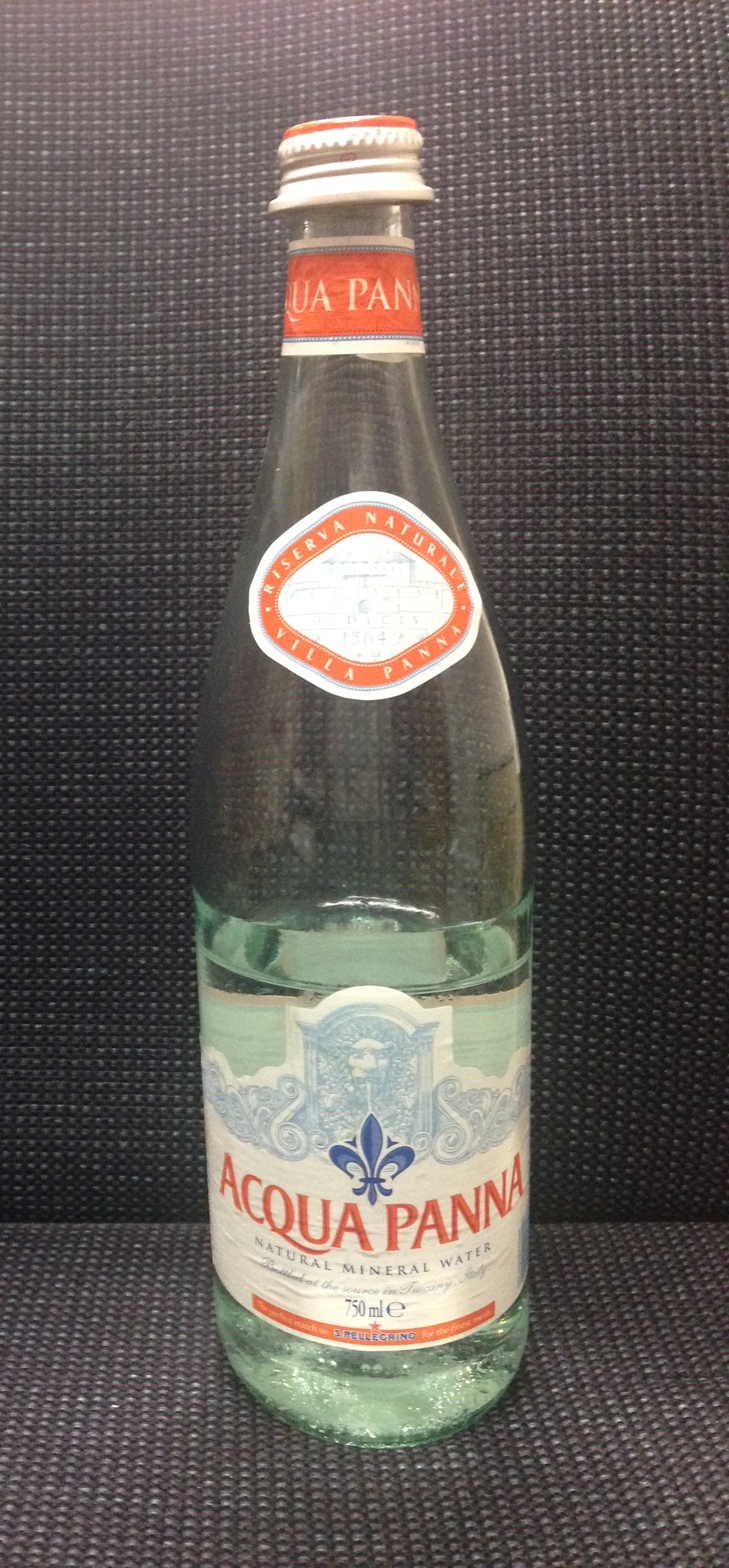
Bottle of Acqua Panna (2014)

Acqua Panna is an Italian brand of bottled water and one of the world's largest bottled water brands. The brand belongs to Sanpellegrino S.p.A subsidiary of Nestlé Waters. Acqua Panna takes its name from Villa Panna in the hills of Tuscany, where the natural spring was first discovered. The water was first bottled in 1880, and was subsequently the first still (uncarbonated) water to be produced in plastic bottles within the boundaries of Italy.

== Origin ==
The Acqua Panna source is located 1,100 m (3,700 feet) high in the Apennine Mountains of Tuscany, to the north of Florence.

== History ==
In the 16th century the powerful ruling family of the Medicis in Florence owned the spring, and it was fenced off as their private property. The family had fresh drinking water from this preserved natural spring, whereas many other unclaimed springs were contaminated with animal waste.

The brand belongs to Sanpellegrino S.p.A subsidiary of Nestlé, and is sold in Europe, the Americas and Asia.

Acqua Panna is bottled in glass (25 cl, 50 cl, 75 cl, 1 L) and plastic (33 cl, 50cl, 75 cl, 1 L) bottles.
