= Perrier =

French mineral water brand

Coordinates: 43.7285°N 4.2434°E

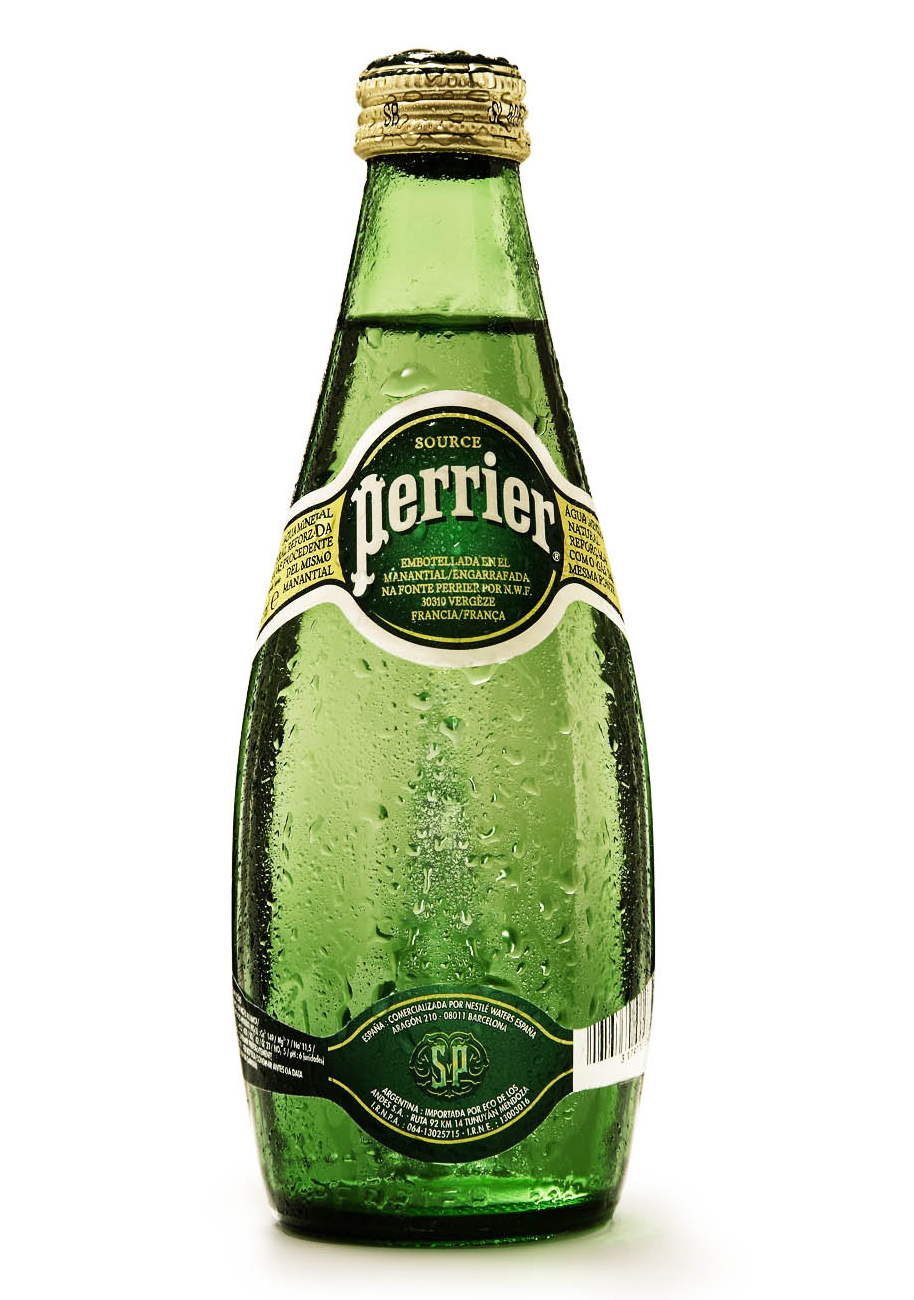
- A 330 ml bottle of Perrier
- Country: France
- Produced by: Nestlé Waters
- Introduced: 1898; 128 years ago
- Source: Vergèze, Gard, France
- Type: Carbonated water
- pH: 5.5–5.46
- Calcium (Ca): 150–160
- Chloride (Cl): 19.5–22
- Bicarbonate (HCO_{3}): 420–430
- Magnesium (Mg): 3.9–4.2
- Nitrate (NO_{3}): 7.3–7.8
- Potassium (K): < 1 (0.6)
- Sodium (Na): 9.6–9.5
- Sulfate (SO_{4}): 25.3–33
- TDS: 456–480
- Website: perrier.com
- All concentrations in milligrams per liter (mg/L); pH without units

Perrier (/ˈpɛrieɪ/ PERR-ee-ay, also US: /ˌpɛriˈeɪ/ -AY; French: [pɛʁje]) is a French brand of bottled water marketed as coming from its source in Vergèze, located in the Gard department. Perrier was part of the Perrier Vittel Group SA, which became Nestlé Waters France after the acquisition of the company by Nestlé in 1992.

== Overview ==
The spring from which Perrier water is sourced is naturally carbonated, but the water and natural carbon dioxide gas are obtained independently. The water is then purified, and during bottling, the carbon dioxide gas is re-added so that the level of carbonation in bottled Perrier matches that of the Vergèze spring.

In 1990, Perrier removed the "naturally sparkling" claim from its bottles under pressure from the United States Food and Drug Administration (FDA).

Since at least 2019, Perrier water is no longer "reinforced with gas from the source" but "with the addition of carbon dioxide". According to the company, this change allows it to considerably reduce its total water consumption and reduce its ecological impact.

In 2024, it was revealed by Radio France and Le Monde that Perrier water, as well as a third of French mineral water brands, were no longer meeting the standards for mineral water due to prohibited purification techniques.

== History ==
The spring in Southern France from which Perrier is drawn was originally known as Les Bouillens (The Bubbles). It had been used as a spa since Roman times. According to the company, Hannibal and his army, having passed through Spain en route to his intended conquest of Rome during 218 BC, decided to rest for a while at Les Bouillens, from which the men took water for refreshment.

Perrier was first introduced to Britain in 1863. Local doctor Louis Perrier bought the spring in 1898 and operated a commercial spa there; he also bottled the water for sale. He later sold the spring to St John Harmsworth, a wealthy British visitor. Harmsworth was the younger brother of the newspaper magnates Lord Northcliffe and Lord Rothermere. He had come to France to learn the language. Dr. Perrier showed him the spring, and he decided to buy it. He sold his share of the family newspapers to raise the money. Harmsworth closed the spa, as spas were becoming unfashionable. He renamed the spring Source Perrier and started bottling the water in distinctive green bottles.

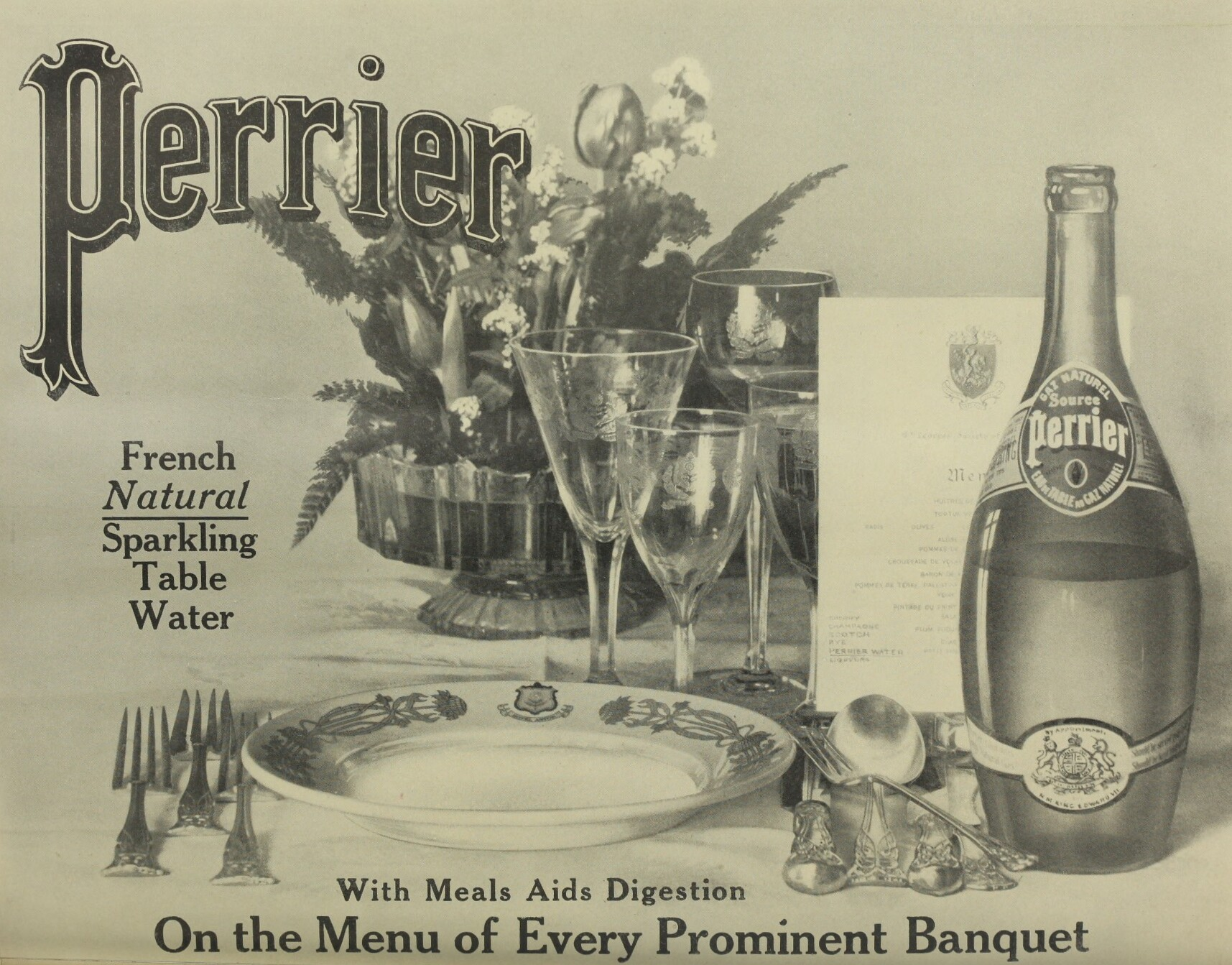
Perrier advertisement in Life on February 24, 1910

Harmsworth marketed the product in Britain at a time when Frenchness was seen as chic and aspirational to the middle classes. It was advertised as the Champagne of mineral water. (Note: There are Champagne houses by the name of Laurent-Perrier and Perrier-Jouët, but there is no connection.) Advertising in newspapers like the Daily Mail established the brand. For a time, 95% of sales were in Britain and the US.

Perrier's reputation for purity suffered a blow in 1990 when a laboratory in North Carolina in the United States found benzene, a carcinogen, in several bottles. Perrier stated that it was an isolated incident of a worker having made a mistake in filtering and that the spring itself was unpolluted. The incident ultimately led to the worldwide withdrawal of the product, with around 160 million bottles of Perrier being recalled.

Two years later in 1992, Perrier was bought by Nestlé, one of the world's leading food and drink companies. Nestlé had to contend with competition from the Agnelli family for ownership of the business.

In 2004, a crisis erupted when Nestlé announced a restructuring plan for Perrier. The following year, Perrier was ordered to halt restructuring due to a failure to consult adequately with staff.

In April 2024, following reports that products had been contaminated with germs of possible faecal origin, an estimated 2.9 million bottles of Perrier water were destroyed before reaching the market. This was followed by an announcement in June that year that one-litre bottles of Perrier Vert would be pulled from the French market after a majority of wells used to capture the water at the Vergèze manufacturing site had their use terminated, suspended or diverted to other product lines, following a product safety inspection at the manufacturing site on 30 May conducted by government agencies.

== Bottling ==
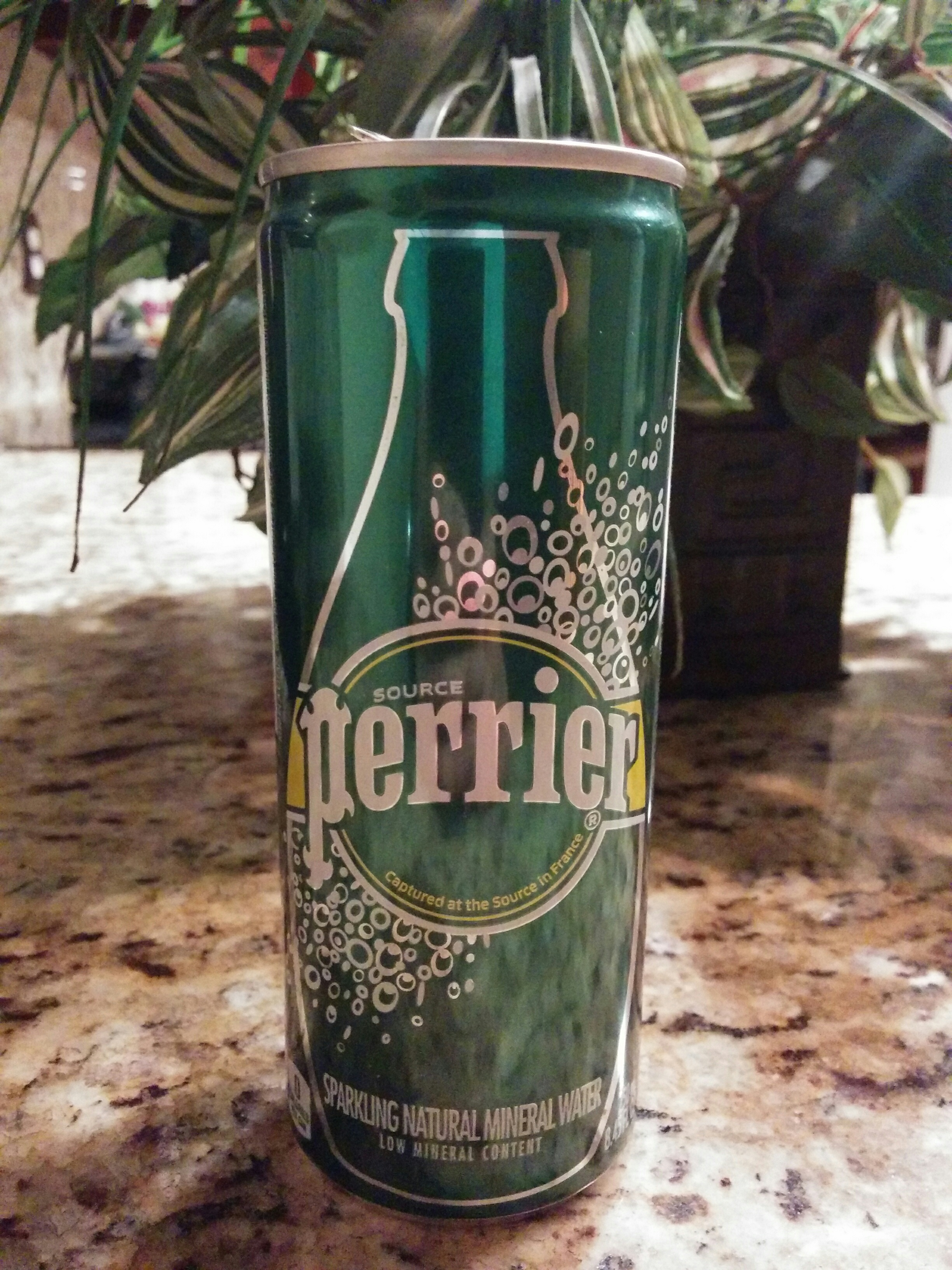
250ml can of Perrier

Perrier is available in 750 ml, 330 ml, and 200 ml glass bottles in Europe, as well as in 330 ml cans. In other markets, the 250 ml can is also available. Perrier bottles all have a distinctive 'teardrop' shape and are a signature green colour. In August 2001, the company introduced a new bottling format using polyethylene terephthalate to offer Perrier in plastic, a change that was researched for 11 years to determine which material would best help retain both the water's flavour and its purported "50 million bubbles."

In 2013, Perrier celebrated its 150th anniversary by launching a limited edition series of bottles inspired by Andy Warhol.

In 2019, Perrier released Perrier ARTXTRA limited edition packaging featuring artwork of artist duo Dabsmyla to help support the contemporary artist community.

== Varieties ==
Perrier comes in several flavours: Natural, Lemon, and Lime have been on the market for many years, and in 2007, Citron Lemon-Lime and Pamplemousse Rose (Pink Grapefruit) flavours debuted in the United States. In 2015, a Green Apple flavour was launched in France as well as the US. In 2016, a Mint flavour (Saveur Menthe) was introduced in France.

Since 2002, new varieties of Perrier have been introduced in France, for example, Eau de Perrier is less carbonated than the original, and comes in a blue bottle. Perrier Fluo comes in flavours such as ginger-cherry, peppermint, orange-lychee, raspberry, and ginger-lemon.

In 2017, Perrier introduced two new flavours, Perrier Strawberry and Perrier Watermelon, to their existing Lime, L’Orange, Pink Grapefruit, and Green Apple flavour.

== Distribution ==
As of January 2013, Perrier was available in 140 countries, and almost 1 billion bottles are sold every year.

== The Perrier Awards ==
From 1981 to 2005, the company sponsored an annual comedy award in the United Kingdom, the Perrier Comedy Award, also known as "The Perriers". It was described as a means of supporting young comedic talent at the Edinburgh Festival Fringe, an arts festival touted as "the world's largest". Initially for comedy reviews, by 1987 this included a standup comedian award. The award's sponsorship was taken over by various other advertisers starting in 2006 with commensurate renaming, and it eventually came to be called the Edinburgh Comedy Awards.

The Perrier Young Jazz Awards were set up by Perrier in 1998, though never attained the success and recognition of their longer running comedy equivalent. The awards ran for four years, releasing an album showcasing its winners each year, before being discontinued. The last year the awards ceremony ran was 2001.

== See also ==
- Apollinaris (water)
- Badoit
- Evian
- Farris
- Gerolsteiner Brunnen
- Acqua Panna
- Ramlösa
- Spa
- Clearly Canadian
- Värska
