= List of bottled water brands =

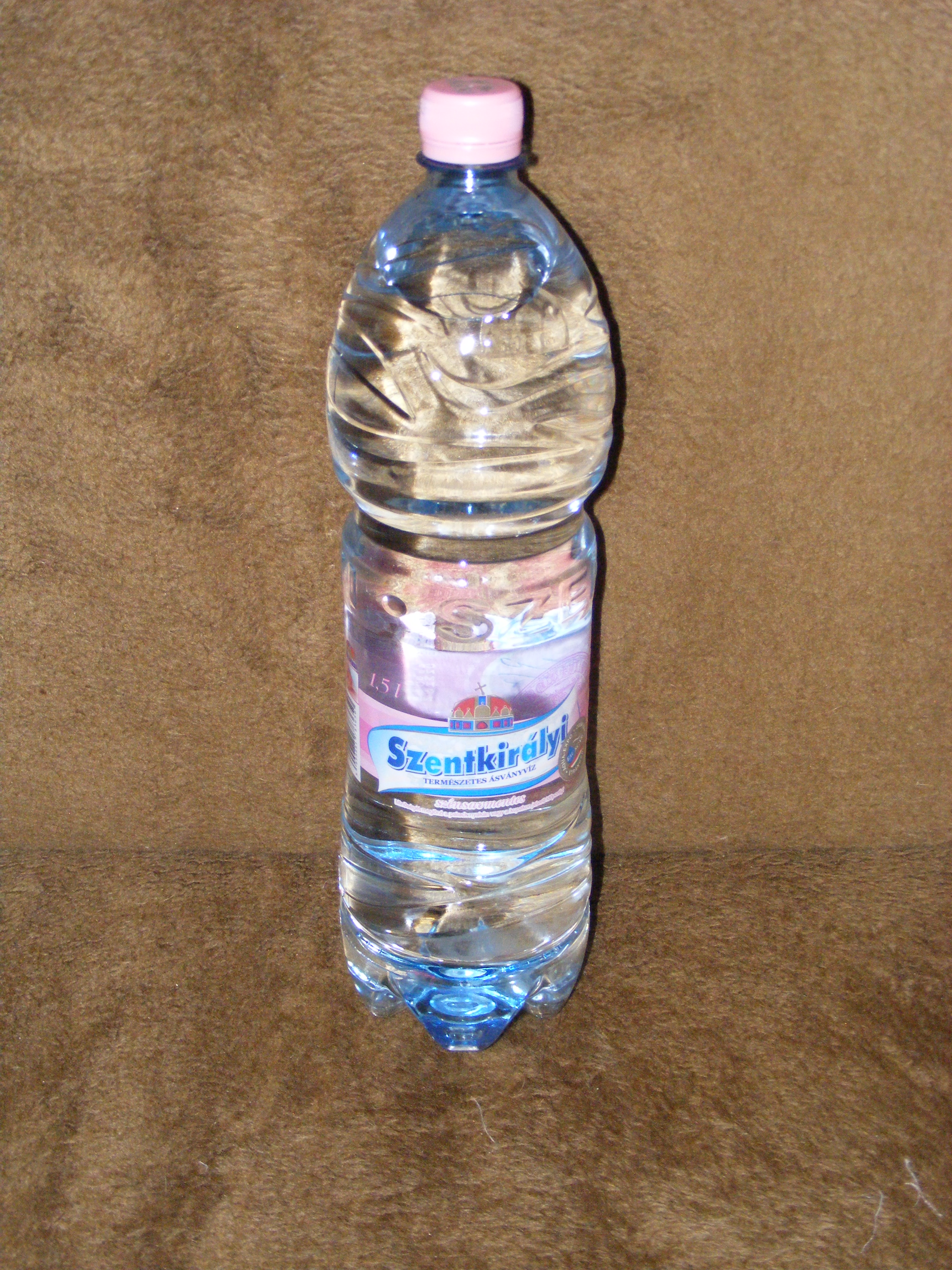
Bottled water

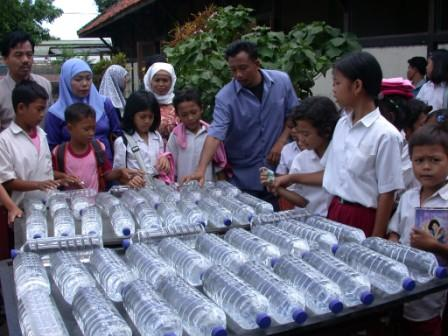
Bottled water for sale in Indonesia

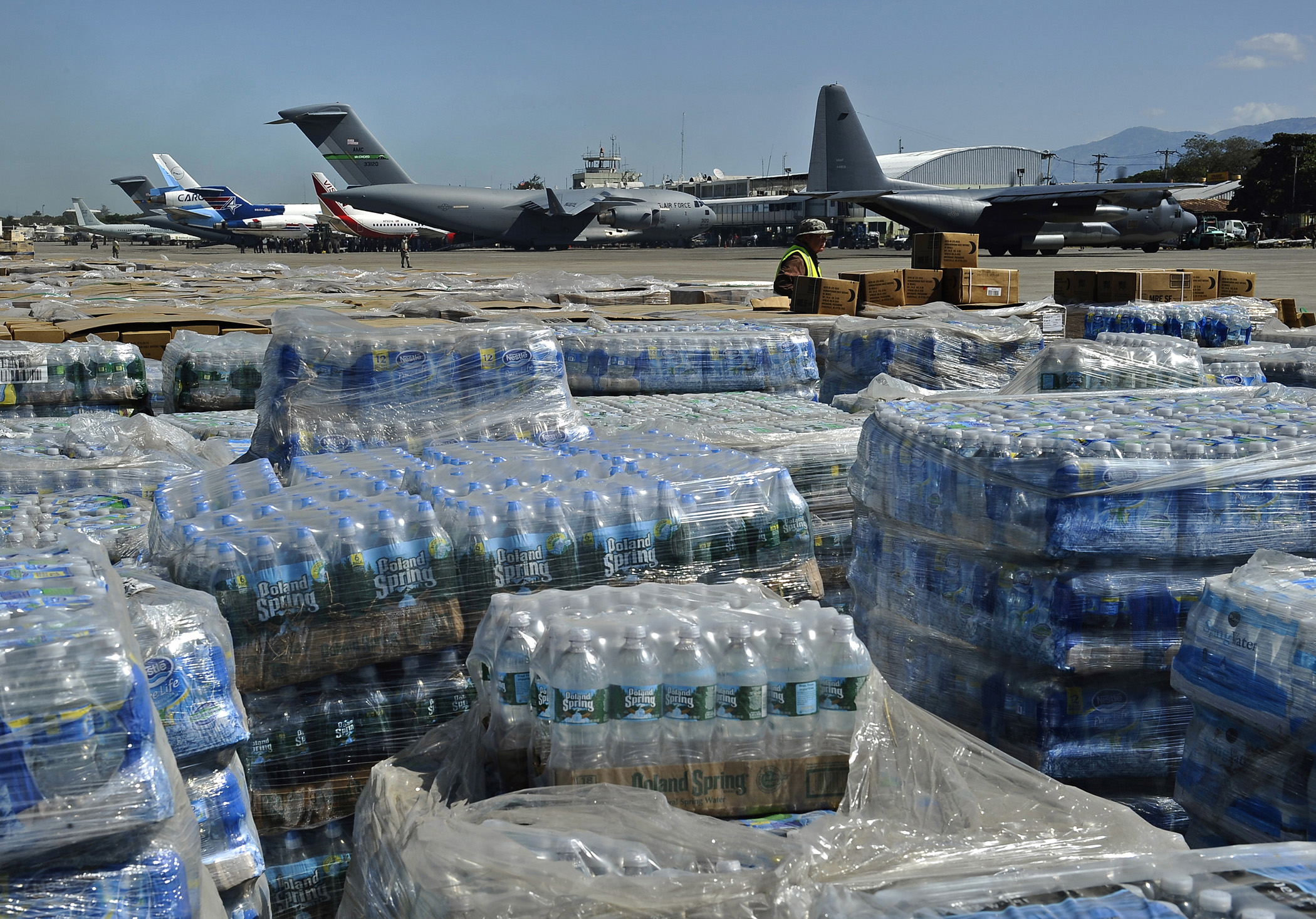
Pallets of bottled water and other humanitarian aid items are lined up in a staging area just off the tarmac of Aérodrome de Jacmel, an airport in Port-au-Prince, Haiti.

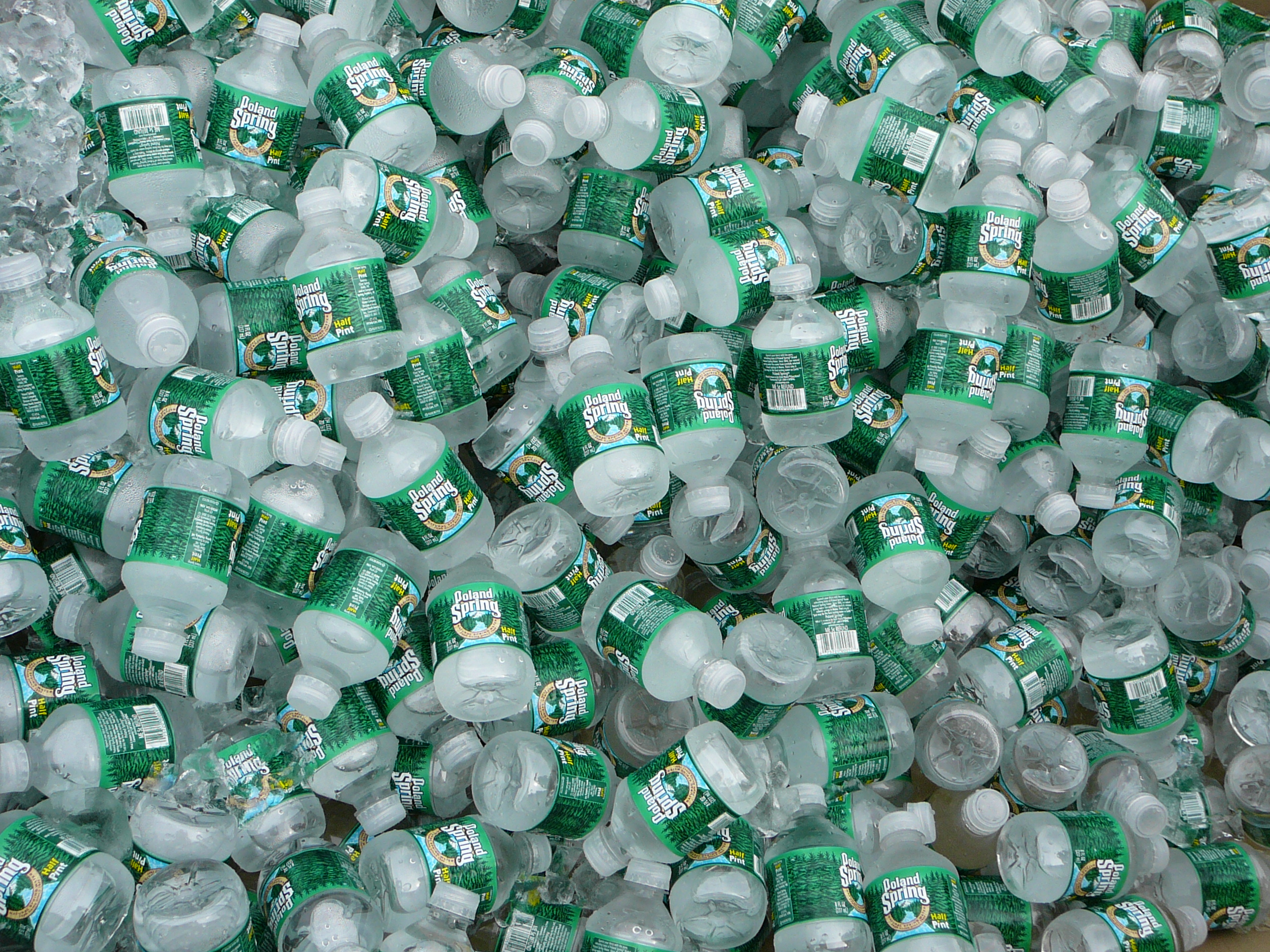
A large pile of half-pint Poland Spring bottles

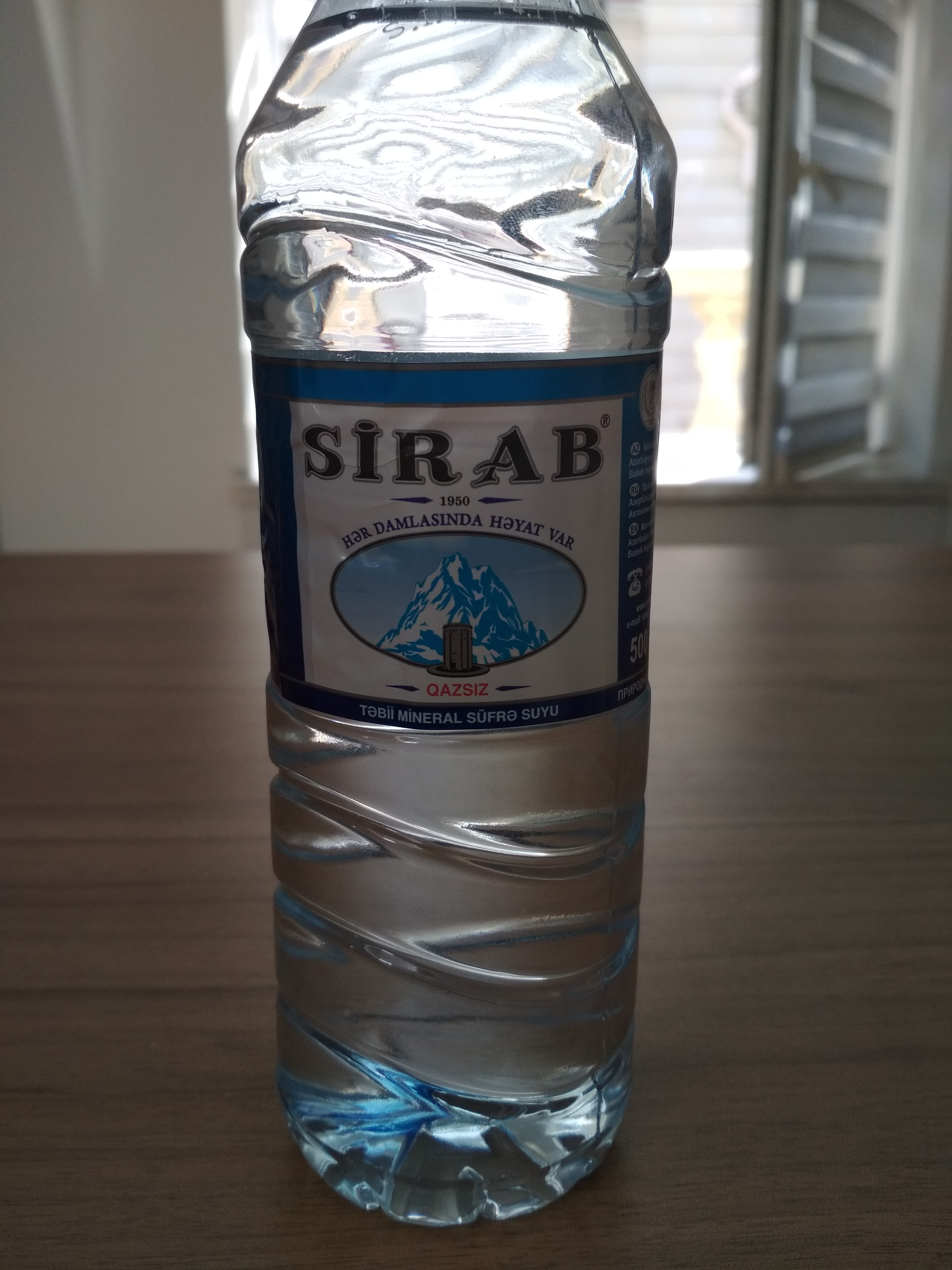
Sirab Azerbaijan natural water

This is a list of bottled water brands. Bottled water is drinking water (e.g., well water, distilled water, mineral water, or spring water) packaged in plastic, cartons, aluminum, or glass water bottles. Bottled water may be carbonated or not. Sizes range from small single serving bottles to large carboys for water coolers. The environmental impact of bottled water is 3,500 times that of tap-water.

== Bottled water brands ==
Brand	Country	Region	Brand owner
Adelholzener Alpenquellen	Germany	Europe	Adelholzener Alpenquellen
AdeS	Indonesia	Asia	The Coca-Cola Company
Agua Mineral Salus	Uruguay	South America	Danone
Agua Vida	Mexico	North America	Unknown
Al Ain	United Arab Emirates	Middle East	Agthia Group
Ambo Mineral Water	Ethiopia	Africa	Unknown
Amma Kudineer	India	Asia	Government of Tamil Nadu
Apenta	Hungary	Europe	Maspex
Apollinaris	Germany	Europe	The Coca-Cola Company
Aqua Pura	United Kingdom	Europe	Nestlé Waters (historically)
Aquafina	United States	North America	PepsiCo
Arrowhead Water	United States	North America	BlueTriton Brands
Arwa	Saudi Arabia, Oman, United Arab Emirates	Middle East	The Coca-Cola Company
Badoit	France	Europe	Danone
Bai Brands	United States	North America	Dr Pepper Snapple Group / Keurig Dr Pepper
Ballygowan	Ireland	Europe	Britvic
Bear-lithia	United States	North America	Historical brand
Belu	United Kingdom	Europe	Belu Water Ltd
Bílinská kyselka	Czech Republic	Europe	Mattoni 1873
Bisleri	India	Asia	Bisleri International
Borjomi	Georgia	Europe/Asia	IDS Borjomi International
Ciego Montero	Cuba	Caribbean	Empresa de Bebidas y Refrescos de Cuba
Ciel	Mexico	North America	The Coca-Cola Company
Contrex	France	Europe	Nestlé Waters
Cool Ridge	Australia	Oceania	Asahi Beverages
Crystal Clear	Philippines	Asia	Crystal Clear Purified Drinking Water Corp.
Crystal Geyser Water Company	United States	North America	Crystal Geyser Water Company
Damavand Mineral Water	Iran	Middle East	Damavand Mineral Water Co.
Dana	Croatia	Europe	Jamnica
Dasani	United States	North America	The Coca-Cola Company
Deep River Rock	Ireland	Europe	Coca-Cola HBC Ireland and Northern Ireland
Deep Spring	United States	North America	Deep Springs College
Deer Park Spring Water	United States	North America	BlueTriton Brands
Dejà Blue	United States	North America	The Coca-Cola Company
Donat Mg	Slovenia	Europe	Atlantic Grupa
Ein Gedi Mineral Water	Israel	Middle East	Ein Gedi Mineral Water Ltd.
Ethos Water	United States	North America	Starbucks
Evian	France	Europe	Danone
Farris	Norway	Europe	Ringnes
Fiji Water	Fiji	Oceania	The Wonderful Company
Font Vella	Spain	Europe	Aguas Danone S.A.
Fruit2O	United States	North America	Sunny Delight Beverages Co.
Fuentealta	Chile	South America	Fuentealta S.A.
Ganten	China	Asia	Ganten Food & Beverage Co., Ltd.
Gerolsteiner Brunnen	Germany	Europe	Gerolsteiner Brunnen
Gourmet Foods	Japan	Asia	Gourmet Foods International Co., Ltd.
Harrogate Spa Water	United Kingdom	Europe	Harrogate Water Brands Ltd.
Highland Spring	United Kingdom	Europe	Highland Spring Group
Ice Mountain	United States	North America	BlueTriton Brands
Iceland Pure Spring Water	Iceland	Europe	Iceland Pure Holdings ehf.
Icelandic Glacial	Iceland	Europe	Icelandic Water Holdings ehf.
Isklar	Norway	Europe	Isklar AS
Jamnica	Croatia	Europe	Fortenova Group
Jana	Croatia	Europe	Jamnica
Jermuk	Armenia	Asia	Jermuk Group
Kellogg's Special K_{2}O Protein Water	United States	North America	Kellanova
Kirkland Signature natural spring water	United States	North America	Costco
Knjaz Miloš a.d.	Serbia	Europe	Knjaz Miloš a.d.
Le Minerale	Indonesia	Asia	Mayora Indah
LEVEL Ultra-Purified Water+	United States	North America	LEVEL Water Co
Liquid Death	United States	North America	Liquid Death Mountain Water, Inc.
Lithia	United States	North America	Historical brand
Londonderry Lithia	United States	North America	Historical brand
Lurisia	Italy	Europe	The Coca-Cola Company
Mai Dubai	United Arab Emirates	Middle East	Mai Dubai LLC
Malvern Water	United Kingdom	Europe	Holywell Water Co. Ltd.
Masafi	United Arab Emirates	Middle East	Hattan
Mattoni	Czech Republic	Europe	Mattoni 1873
Mey Eden	Israel	Middle East	Mey Eden Ltd.
Mohai Agnes mineral water	China	Asia	Mohai Agnes Mineral Water Co., Ltd.
Mount Franklin Water	Australia	Oceania	Coca-Cola Europacific Partners
Mountain Valley Spring Water	United States	North America	Primo Brands
Nabeglavi	Georgia	Europe/Asia	Healthy Water LLC
Naya Waters	Canada	North America	Naya Waters Inc.
Nestlé Pure Life	Switzerland	Global	Nestlé Waters
Buxton	United Kingdom	Europe	Nestlé Waters
Neviot	Israel	Middle East	Neviot Ltd.
NEWater	Singapore	Asia	Public Utilities Board
Nongfu Spring	China	Asia	Nongfu Spring
Ozarka	United States	North America	BlueTriton Brands
Panama Blue	Panama	Central America	Panama Blue Springs Corporation
Pennine Spring	United Kingdom	Europe	Pennine Spring Ltd.
Penta Water	United States	North America	Penta Water Company
Perrier	France	Europe	Nestlé Waters
Pluto Water	United States	North America	Historical brand
Poland Spring	United States	North America	BlueTriton Brands
Polar	United States	North America	Polar Beverages
Powwow Water	United States	North America	Historical brand
Princes Gate Spring Water	United Kingdom	Europe	Princes Gate Water Ltd.
Propel Fitness Water	United States	North America	PepsiCo
Pump	Australia	Oceania	Coca-Cola Europacific Partners
Radenska	Slovenia	Europe	Kofola ČeskoSlovensko
Ramlösa	Sweden	Europe	Carlsberg Group
San Pellegrino	Italy	Europe	Nestlé Waters
Sairme	Georgia	Europe/Asia	Sairme Mineral Waters LLC
San Mateo	Philippines	Asia	Coca-Cola Europacific Aboitiz Philippines
Sanfaustino	Italy	Europe	Acqua Minerale Sanfaustino S.p.A.
Selters	Germany	Europe	Selters Mineralquelle Augusta Victoria GmbH
Sierra Springs	United States	North America	Primo Brands
Sohat	Saudi Arabia	Middle East	Sohat Bottled Water Co.
Souroti	Greece	Europe	Souroti S.A.
Spa	Belgium	Europe	Spadel
Sparkletts	United States	North America	Primo Brands
Staatl. Fachingen	Germany	Europe	Fachingen Heil- und Mineralbrunnen GmbH
Tannourine	Lebanon	Middle East	Tannourine Natural Spring Water Co.
Himalayan	India	Asia	Tata Consumer Products
Tau	New Zealand	Oceania	Tau Water Ltd.
Tipperary Natural Mineral Water	Ireland	Europe	Tipperary Natural Mineral Water Ltd.
Topo Chico	Mexico	North America	The Coca-Cola Company
Trump Ice	United States	North America	Trump Ice LLC
Tŷ Nant	United Kingdom	Europe	Tŷ Nant Spring Water Ltd.
Valpre	South Africa	Africa	Coca-Cola Beverages South Africa
VEEN	Finland	Europe	VEEN Waters Finland Oy
Verna Natural Mineral Water	Italy	Europe	Acqua Verna S.p.A.
Vittel	France	Europe	Nestlé Waters
Volvic	France	Europe	Danone
Vöslauer	Austria	Europe	Vöslauer Mineralwasser GmbH
Voss	Norway	Europe	VOSS of Norway AS
Watsons Water	Hong Kong	Asia	A.S. Watson Group
Whistler Water	Canada	North America	Whistler Water Inc.
Zaječická hořká	Czech Republic	Europe	Zaječická hořká a.s.
Zephyrhills	United States	North America	BlueTriton Brands
Żywiec Zdrój	Poland	Europe	Danone
