= Aquafina =

Bottled water brand

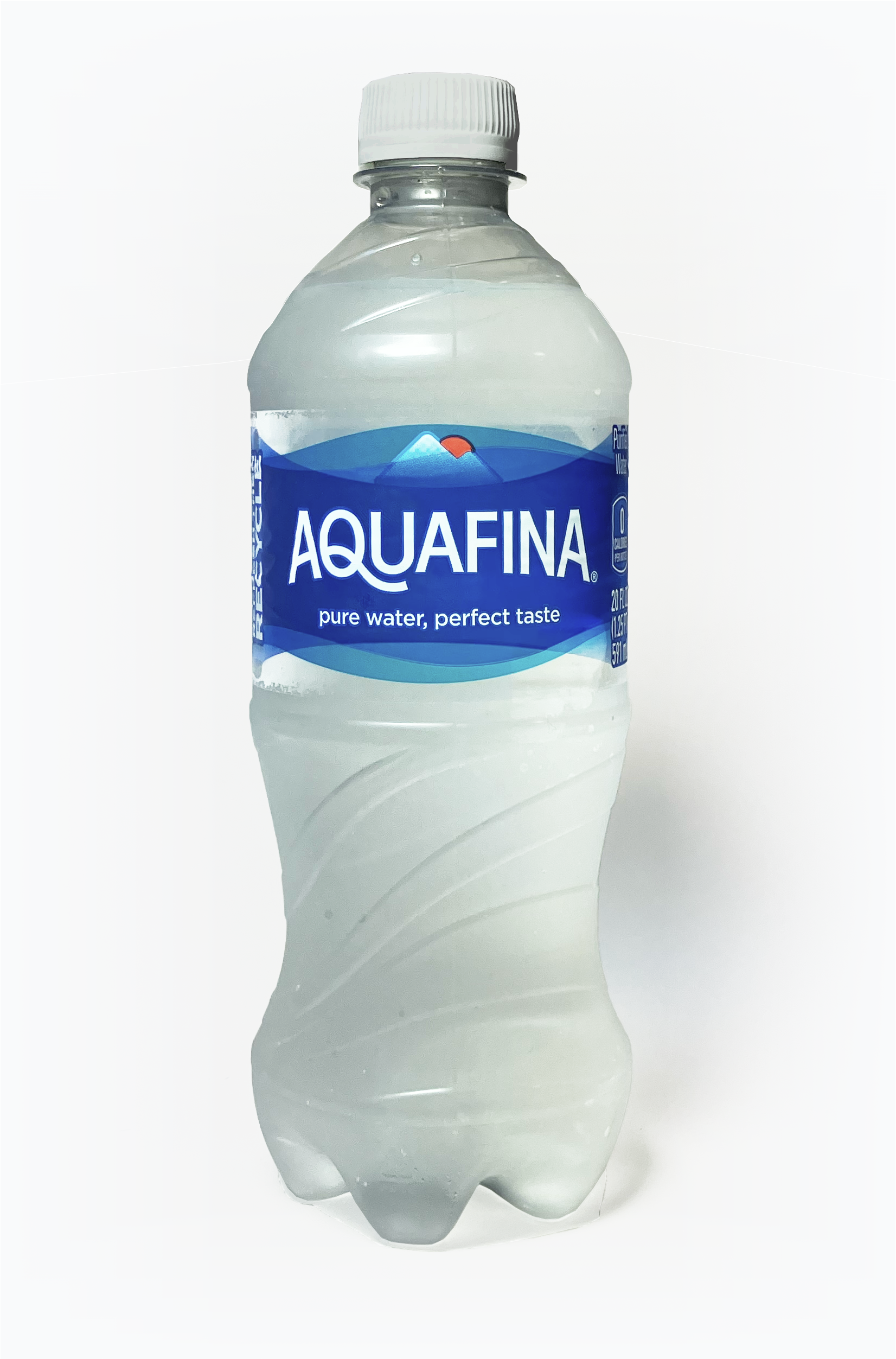
- Regular bottle of Aquafina water
- Type: Water Beverage
- Manufacturer: PepsiCo
- Origin: United States
- Introduced: July 1994; 32 years ago Wichita, Kansas, U.S.
- Website: aquafina.com

Aquafina (/ˌɑːkwəˈfiːnə/) is an American brand of purified bottled water that is produced by PepsiCo, consisting of both unflavored and flavored water. The Aquafina brand name is also licensed for use on multiple skin care products, including lip balm and wrinkle cream. It was first distributed in Wichita, Kansas in July 1994, before becoming more widely sold across the United States, Canada, Spain, Peru (called "San Carlos"), Lebanon, Turkey, the GCC countries, Iran, Egypt, Nigeria, Morocco, Vietnam, Pakistan, Bangladesh and India. The product was introduced after four unsuccessful previous attempts by PepsiCo to enter the bottled water market, including the creation of Ice Mountain in 1987. The brand now primarily competes with The Coca-Cola Company's Dasani, Keurig Dr. Pepper's Dejà Blue, and the various names used by BlueTriton Brands. As of 2009, Aquafina represented 13.4% of domestic bottled water sales in the United States, making it the number one bottled water brand as measured by retail sales.

== Product variants ==
Aquafina Pure Water, the primary unflavored product produced under the Aquafina brand, is derived from local municipal water sources and goes through a purification process that incorporates reverse osmosis, ultraviolet, and ozone sterilization. Beginning on 27 July 2007, a disclaimer was added to each bottle of Aquafina, stating the water comes from a "public source". In Canada, the current 1.5 litres (51 US fl oz) bottle of water displays "Demineralized Treat Water". In response to concerns amongst environmental advocates who raised questions over the disclosure of water sources, a PepsiCo spokeswoman stated, "If this helps clarify the fact that the water originates from public sources, then it's a reasonable thing to do."

Previous logo from 2004 to 2013

Aquafina FlavorSplash in a grocery store display cooler

Flavored variations are also produced under the Aquafina brand name – all of which are labeled as containing no calories and no carbohydrates. Aquafina FlavorSplash, first introduced in 2005, is a flavored water product line which is non-carbonated and artificially sweetened with Sucralose. As of 2011, it is produced in six flavors: Grape, Strawberry Kiwi, Wild Berry, Raspberry, Lemon, and Peach Mango. Aquafina Sparkling is a carbonated line of flavored water; however its production was discontinued in the U.S. in late 2010. Other former products included Aquafina Alive (a low calorie, vitamin-enhanced water beverage introduced in 2007 and discontinued in 2009) and Aquafina plus+ (a low calorie flavored water labeled as a vitamin supplement) – both of which have been discontinued in the U.S. As of 2011, the "Sparkling" and "plus+" lines were still in production in other markets such as Canada.

== Packaging ==
Aquafina is sold in 12 US fluid ounces (0.35 L), 500 millilitres (17 US fl oz), 20 US fluid ounces (0.59 L), 24 US fluid ounces (0.71 L), 1 litre (34 US fl oz), and 1.5 litres (51 US fl oz) bottles. The bottled water industry has been criticized for its reliance on plastic packaging, the production and distribution of which require additional petrochemical inputs.

Aquafina's packaging has changed over time in an effort to reduce the environmental effects associated with production and shipment. These changes have focused mainly on reducing package weight. In 2009, Aquafina introduced a redesigned bottle that reduced its weight by about 50%, to 10.9 grams (0.38 oz); according to the company, the change lowered plastic use in production by 75 million pounds.

== Sponsorship ==
Since shortly after its inception, the promotion of Aquafina has involved sports sponsorships. As of 2011, it is listed as being an official sponsor of Major League Soccer, the Professional Golfers' Association of America, the Arizona Diamondbacks, the Carolina Panthers and the New York Giants. Its packaging also states that it is the "official water of Major League Baseball", which has been the case since the beginning of the 2008 MLB season. In NASCAR, it is a sponsor for Hendrick Motorsports and Kasey Kahne.

== Litigation ==
Charles Joyce and James Voigt won a $1.26 billion judgment against PepsiCo after saying that the company had created Aquafina by stealing their idea to sell purified bottled water. This judgment was vacated on 6 November 2009, when it was discovered that PepsiCo had failed to respond to the lawsuit due to a misplacement of the paperwork.

== See also ==
- Cool Ridge
- Mount Franklin Water
- Pump
- List of Coca-Cola brands
- List of bottled water brands
