= Gerolsteiner Brunnen =

German mineral water firm

Gerolsteiner
- Country: Germany
- Source: Gerolstein
- Type: Sparkling, still
- pH: 5.9 to 6.0
- Bromine (Br): 0.12
- Calcium (Ca): 348
- Chloride (Cl): 39.7
- Bicarbonate (HCO_{3}): 1816
- Fluoride (F): 0.21
- Lithium (Li): 0.13
- Manganese (Mn): 0.39
- Magnesium (Mg): 108
- Nitrate (NO_{3}): 5.1
- Potassium (K): 10.8
- Silica (SiO_{2}): 40.2
- Sodium (Na): 118
- Strontium (Sr): 2.9
- Sulfate (SO_{4}): 38.3
- TDS: 2488
- Website: gerolsteiner.de
- All concentrations in milligrams per liter (mg/L); pH without units

Gerolsteiner Brunnen GmbH & Co. KG (Gerolsteiner) is a leading German mineral water firm with its seat in Gerolstein in the Eifel mountains. The firm is well known for its Gerolsteiner Sprudel brand, a bottled, naturally carbonated mineral water. Gerolsteiner was also the chief sponsor of Team Gerolsteiner a cycling team.

== History ==
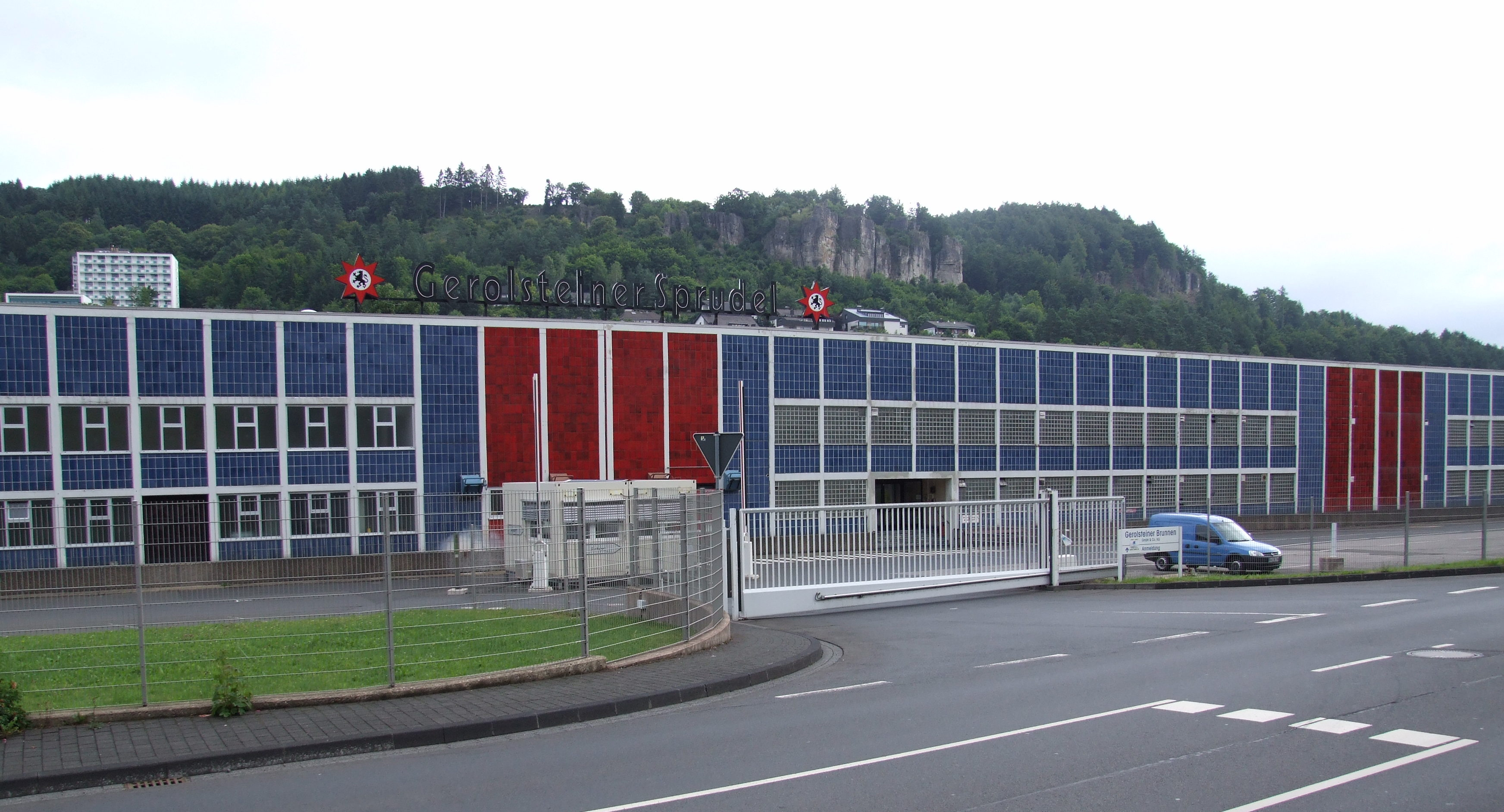
Gerolsteiner factory

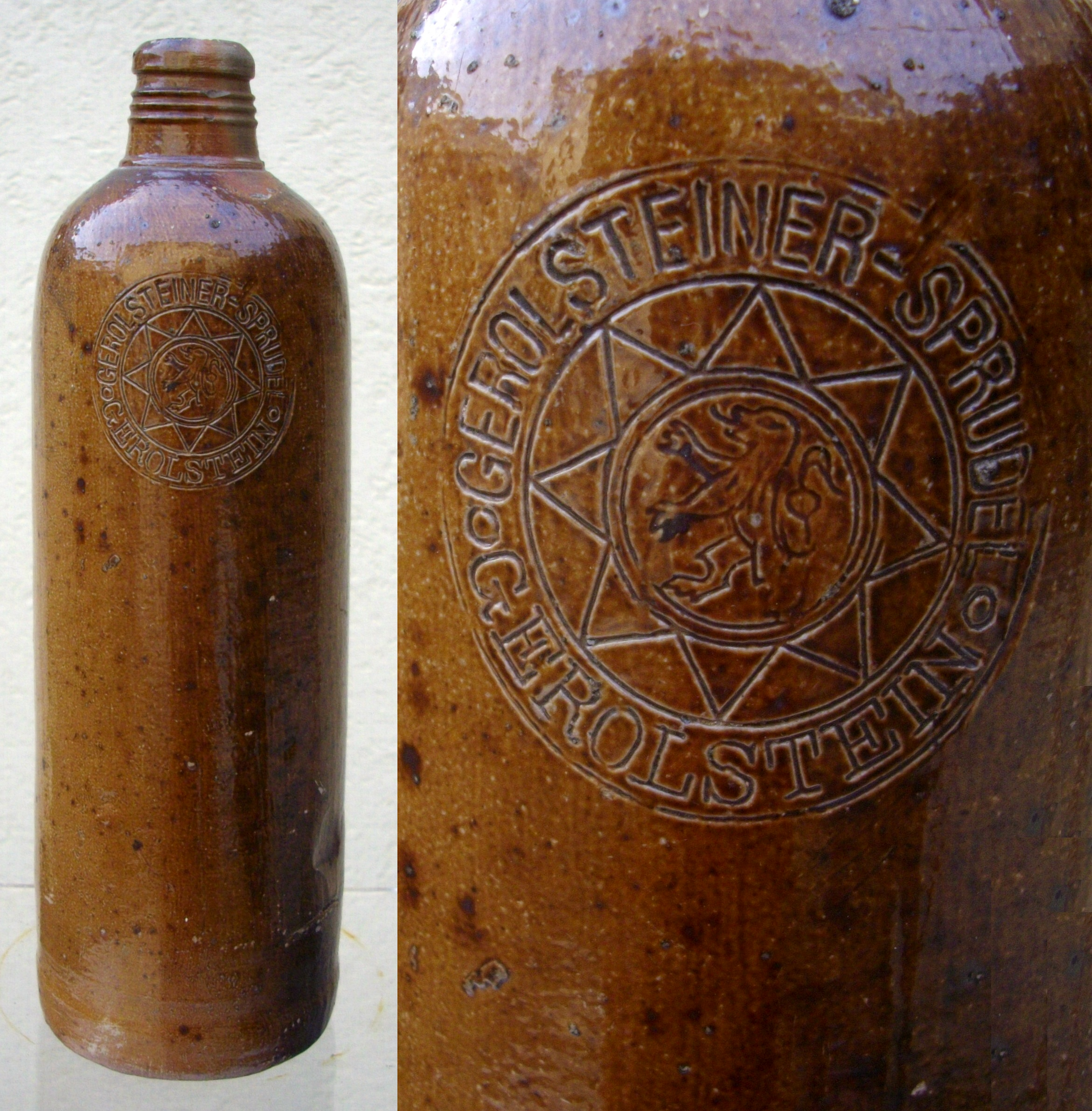
Gerolsteiner mineral water bottle with its star-and-lion trademark, nineteenth century

On 1 January 1888 the mine manager, Wilhelm Castendyck, founded the firm, Gerolsteiner Sprudel, as a Gesellschaft mit beschränkter Haftung (GmbH) in Gerolstein. Its first well was drilled in the same year. By November, the water from the well had become a sort of 'official' water of the city. It was popular because of its high amount of natural carbonic acid. In 1889, its star-and-lion symbol was trademarked. By 1895, the water was being exported to Australia.

Brunnen table water supplied water to Buckingham Palace during the reign of Queen Victoria.

The first exports of Gerolsteiner to the United States started in 1890, primarily to Chicago, known for its high concentration of German emigrants. Having been interrupted by World War I, U.S. shipments resumed in 1928.

The Gerolsteiner factory was completely destroyed in a bombing raid during Christmas 1944. The filling machines were repaired in 1948, and by 1948 both the full building and the installation equipment had been rebuilt.

In 1986, Gerolsteiner introduced a brand with a lower amount of carbonic acid to meet changing tastes.

In 1998, the company introduced Germany's first PET reusable deposit carrying mineral water bottle to a chorus of criticism from environmental groups. The use of returnable, deposit-bearing glass bottles for water, beer, and other mainstream drinks has long been normal in Germany and other European countries.

As of 2022, Gerolsteiner Brunnen's majority shareholder is Bitburger Holding.

== See also ==
- Mineral water
- Staatl. Fachingen
- Apollinaris (water)
- Badoit
- Evian
- Farris
- Perrier
- Panna
- Rosbacher
- S.Pellegrino
- Ramlösa
- Spa
