= Karl Wilhelm Krause =

German SS officer (1911–2001)

- Born: 5 March 1911; Michelau, West Prussia, Prussia, German Empire
- Died: 6 May 2001 (aged 90); Germany
- Military career
- Allegiance: Weimar Republic; Nazi Germany
- Branch: ReichsmarineLSSAH; Kriegsmarine; Waffen-SS
- Service years: 1931–1945
- Rank: SS-Hauptsturmführer
- Units: 1st SS Division Leibstandarte SS Adolf Hitler, Führerbegleitkommando; 12th SS Panzer Division Hitlerjugend
- Conflicts: Invasion of Norway
- Awards: Destroyer War Badge; Narvik Shield; Iron Cross 1st Class; Iron Cross 2nd Class

Karl Wilhelm Krause (5 March 1911 – 6 May 2001) was a Waffen-SS officer (SS number: 236,858) who rose to the rank of SS-Hauptsturmführer (captain) during World War II. He was a personal orderly (valet) and bodyguard to Adolf Hitler from 1934 to mid-September 1939. Thereafter, he served in the 12th SS Panzer Division Hitlerjugend. Krause came up with the concept of an anti-aircraft tank that became known as the Flakpanzer IV Wirbelwind. At the war's end he surrendered to American troops. Krause was interned until June 1946.

== Early life ==
Krause was born in Michelau, West Prussia in March 1911. He studied cabinet making and architecture prior to joining the Reichsmarine (German navy) in 1931.

== Hitler's valet ==
In 1934, Hitler chose Krause from a line-up of Reichsmarine sailors to be his personal orderly and bodyguard. Krause was then given the rank of SS-Untersturmführer, made a member of the Leibstandarte SS Adolf Hitler (LSSAH) and assigned to the Führerbegleitkommando unit, which provided personal security for Hitler. He remained a reserve officer in the navy. Hitler called Krause his "Schatten" (shadow) as he was always behind Hitler at public appearances and followed him everywhere. Hitler informed Krause that he was under Hitler's personal command and that "no one must know what you see and hear". In early 1935, Krause trained Heinz Linge who Hitler had chosen to be an additional valet. On Christmas Eve 1937, Hitler and Krause sneaked out incognito together for a night in the city. Hitler was not recognized. Krause was reprimanded the following day by Reichsführer-SS Heinrich Himmler for allowing the escapade to go forward without reporting it.

Through Krause's statements after the war, Hitler's daily routine became known. In the late morning, Krause would knock on the door and leave newspapers and messages outside Hitler's room. Hitler, who slept in a night shirt would bathe and shave himself. After getting dressed, Hitler would emerge from his bedroom for morning breakfast. For breakfast, Hitler often ate an apple, cheese, zwieback bread and drank tea. Besides discretion, Krause had to pay attention to details, anticipating Hitler's desires and whims. For example, Krause would have 5 or 6 movie films ready and available for Hitler to view at night. He stated that Hitler's favorite actress was Greta Garbo and recalled that he enjoyed the film, The Lives of a Bengal Lancer.

In September 1939, during a front line inspection, Hitler requested from Krause a bottle of Fachinger mineral water. However, Krause had forgotten to bring it along. Hitler did not want to drink the local Polish water out of caution that it might be poisoned. Krause served Hitler regular water "falsely stating it was Fachinger". Hitler quickly discovered the truth and dismissed Krause from his service as chief valet. Linge thereby became Krause's successor as chief personal valet to Hitler.

== World War II ==
Krause returned to the Kriegsmarine and took part in the invasion of Norway in April 1940. Thereafter, he served again in the LSSAH as an ordnance officer assigned to the Reich Chancellery. In December 1943, Krause was assigned to the 12th SS Panzer Division Hitlerjugend and rose to the rank of SS-Hauptsturmführer. During the summer of 1944, his flak unit was credited with shooting down 45 allied aircraft.

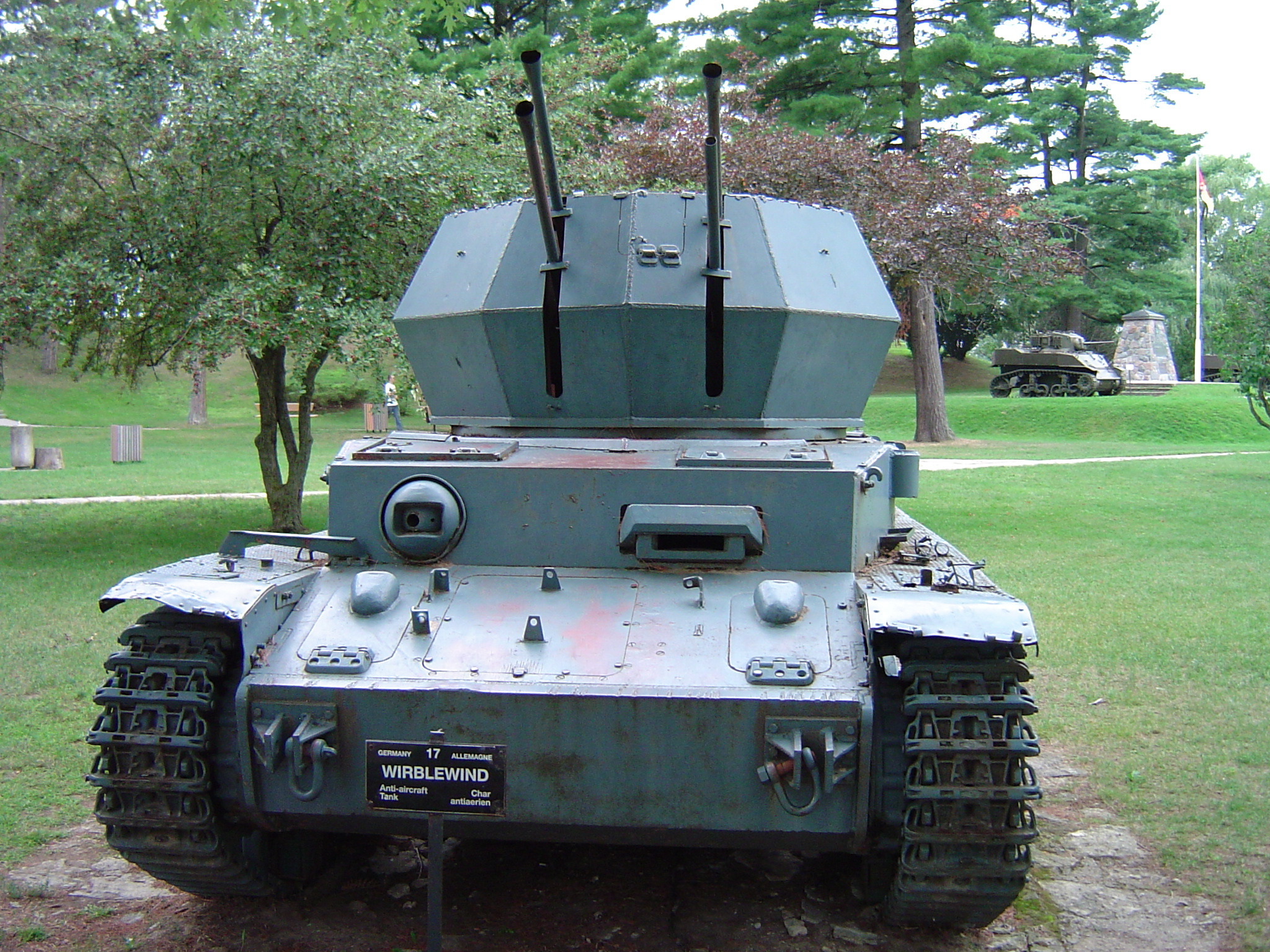
Flakpanzer IV Wirbelwind at CFB Borden

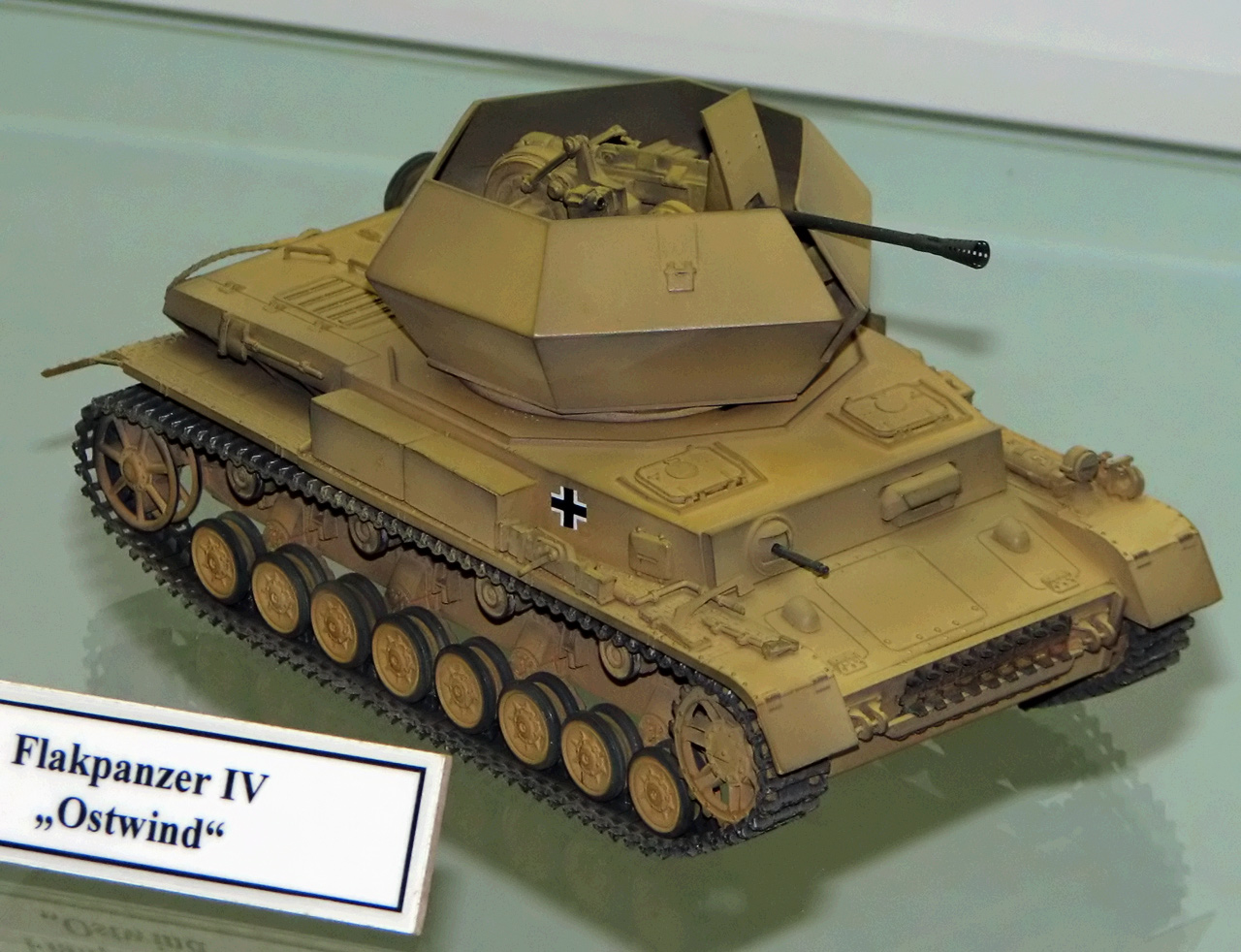
Model of the Flakpanzer IV Ostwind (East Wind)

During the summer of 1944, Krause came up with the concept of an anti-aircraft tank that became known as the Flakpanzer IV Wirbelwind (English: Whirlwind). Four 20 mm Flak 38 L/112.5 guns were mounted in an open top turret—surrounded by nine armored side panels—on a Panzer IV tank chassis. Krause presented the idea to SS-Obersturmbannführer Max Wünsche, commanding officer of the 12th SS Panzer Regiment and the concept was approved by Hitler. The Wirbelwinds were produced at the Ostbau Works in Sagan, Silesia. An approximate total of 87 to 105 were produced between May and November 1944. However, due to discrepancies between the recorded production numbers at the Ostbau Works and Wehrmacht service records, the exact number is unknown.

In action it was determined that the 20 mm guns were more effective against ground targets than aircraft. A more powerful successor was produced, known as the Flakpanzer IV Ostwind (East Wind). It was armed with a single 37 mm Flak 43 L/89 gun.

== Post-war ==
In May 1945 Krause fled west to avoid the Red Army and surrendered to American troops. He was interrogated and interned until June 1946. He was later fined and released. As a bodyguard, he was not considered to have been a war criminal despite his "mid-rank" as an SS officer. Thereafter, Krause lived in central Germany and worked as a waiter and interior designer. His memoirs were published in West Germany as Zehn Jahre Tag und Nacht Kammerdiener bei Hitler ("Ten Years as Hitler's Valet Day and Night"), Hamburg 1949. Later, Krause appeared in and narrated a film on DVD entitled, Der Kammerdiener Adolf Hitlers (English: The Valet of Adolf Hitler): Karl Wilhelm Krause 1934–1943.

== Awards and decorations ==
- German Sports Badge
- Iron Cross (1939) 2nd and 1st Class
- Destroyer War Badge
- Narvik Shield

== See also ==
- Glossary of German military terms
