= Spa water =

Spa water may refer to:

- Spring (hydrology)
  - Mineral spring, a spring whose water contains dissolved minerals
- Bottled mineral water from the springs of a day spa or destination spa
- Water in a whirlpool bath
- Spa (mineral water), a brand of mineral water from Spa, Belgium
- Infused water, flavored with fruits or vegetables
