= Re:Kessoku Band =

EP by Kessoku Band
- Released: August 14, 2024
- Studios: Catapult (Tokyo); Victor (Tokyo); Onkio Haus (Tokyo); Sony Music (Tokyo)
- Genres: Rock; anime song
- Length: 25:22
- Language: Japanese
- Label: Aniplex

Kessoku Band chronology
| Kessoku Band Concert: Fixed Star at Zepp Haneda (Tokyo) (2024) | Re:Kessoku Band (2024) | We Will (2024) |

Singles from Re:Kessoku Band
- 1. "Shine as Usual" Released: June 9, 2024; 2. "Now, I'm Going from Underground" Released: June 9, 2024; 3. "Doppelganger" Released: August 11, 2024; 4. "Re:Re:" Released: August 11, 2024

Re:Kessoku Band (Japanese: Re:結束バンド, Hepburn: Āru Ī Kessoku Bando) is the debut EP by Kessoku Band, a fictional rock band from the anime television series Bocchi the Rock!, released by Aniplex on August 14, 2024. It consists of six tracks, including the theme music of the two compilation films of the anime series. The EP peaked at number two on the Billboard Japan Hot Albums chart and the Oricon Albums Chart. It won Animation Album of the Year at the 39th Japan Gold Disc Awards in 2025.

== Background and release ==
On May 21, 2023, Aniplex announced that the Bocchi the Rock! anime series would be receiving a compilation film project. It was later revealed to be two films, subtitled Re: and Re:Re:, that were scheduled to premiere in Japan on August 7 and June 9, 2024. "Shine as Usual" was announced as the first film's opening theme, with Ai Higuchi writing the lyrics and Otoha composing the music. On June 6, 2024, the ending theme for Re: was revealed to be "Now, I'm Going from Underground", written and composed by Yūho Kitazawa, the vocalist and guitarist of the Peggies. A six-track EP titled Re:Kessoku Band was also announced and would include the theme music from the compilation films. "Shine as Usual" and "Now, I'm Going from Underground" were released for digital download and streaming on June 9, with the former being accompanied by a lyric video.

On August 1, "Me and the Three Primary Colors" was revealed to be included in the EP. Written by Higuchi and composed by Masahiro Tobinai, it is a tie-in collaboration with Coca-Cola's mineral water brand I-Lohas. Following the release of Re:Re:, it was announced that its opening theme is titled "Doppelganger", also written by Higuchi and composed by Tobinai. The song was heard during Kessoku Band's first live concert in the film as an additional performance that was not depicted in the anime series. The ending theme is a cover version of Asian Kung-Fu Generation's "Re:Re:", and features vocals by Yoshino Aoyama as the character Hitori Gotō. Both songs debuted on digital platforms on August 11 along with a lyric video for "Doppelganger". Re:Kessoku Band was released by Aniplex on August 14, 2024. It is scheduled to be released as a two-disc vinyl LP on December 23, 2026; the release will include tracks from the "Into the Light" single and the We Will EP.

== Critical reception ==
Writing for Mantan Web, Shō Higuchi said that Re:Kessoku Band contains "catchy, killer tunes" that leave a striking impression on the films. In 2025, it won Animation Album of the Year at the 39th Japan Gold Disc Awards.

== Commercial performance ==
Re:Kessoku Band debuted at number one in Oricon's Digital Albums Chart, recording 5,473 downloads in its first week. It entered the Albums Chart at number two with 33,876 copies sold, behind Takuya Kimura's See You There, and later ranked second in the Combined Albums Chart. The album opened at number two in the Billboard Japan Hot Albums chart with recorded sales of 30,551 CDs, ranking second in the Top Album Sales chart, and 3,949 downloads, ranking first in the Download Albums chart.

== Track listing ==
Credits adapted from the album's liner notes. All tracks are arranged by Ritsuo Mitsui.

Re:Kessoku Band track listing
| No. | Title | Lyrics | Music | Vocals | Length |
|---|---|---|---|---|---|
| 1. | "Shine as Usual" (月並みに輝け, Tsukinami ni Kagayake) | Ai Higuchi | Otoha | Ikumi Hasegawa | 4:07 |
| 2. | "Now, I'm Going from Underground" (今、僕、アンダーグラウンドから, Ima, Boku, Andāguraundo kara) | Yūho Kitazawa | Kitazawa | Hasegawa | 4:19 |
| 3. | "Doppelganger" (ドッペルゲンガー, Dopperugengā) | Higuchi | Masahiro Tobinai | Hasegawa | 3:39 |
| 4. | "Me and the Three Primary Colors" (僕と三原色, Boku to Sangenshoku) | Higuchi | Tobinai | Hasegawa | 3:39 |
| 5. | "Chronostasis" (秒針少女, Byōshin Shōjo) | Otoha | Otoha | Hasegawa | 4:31 |
| 6. | "Re:Re:" | Masafumi Gotoh | Gotoh; Takahiro Yamada | Yoshino Aoyama | 5:07 |
| Total length: | | | | | 25:22 |

== Personnel ==
Credits adapted from The First Times and the album's liner notes.

=== Fictional line-up ===
- Ikuyo Kita – vocals, guitar
- Hitori Gotō – lead guitar, lyrics
- Ryō Yamada – bass, backing vocals, composition
- Nijika Ijichi – drums

=== Musicians ===
- Osamu Hidai – drums (all tracks)
- Yūichi Takama – bass guitar (all tracks)
- Ritsuo Mitsui – guitar, arrangement (all tracks)
- Ikumi Hasegawa (as Ikuyo Kita) – vocals (tracks 1–5)
- Yoshino Aoyama (as Hitori Gotō) – vocals (track 6)
- Saku Mizuno (as Ryō Yamada) – backing vocals

=== Technical ===
- Gen Okamura – director
- Gendam – recording, mixing
- Mitsuyasu Abe – mastering
- Masaharu Yamanouchi – production
- Hideki Morioka – production cooperation
- Yōko Shimane – production cooperation
- Yōta Naka – production cooperation

=== Design ===
- Kerorira – key frame
- Rina Iwabuchi – coloring
- Tsubasa Kanamori – photography
- Yasunao Moriyasu – background
- Tomoyuki Uchikoga – product design

== Charts ==
=== Weekly charts ===
Weekly chart performance for Re:Kessoku Band
| Chart (2024) | Peak position |
|---|---|
| Japanese Albums (Oricon) | 2 |
| Japanese Combined Albums (Oricon) | 2 |
| Japanese Hot Albums (Billboard Japan) | 2 |

=== Monthly charts ===
Monthly chart performance for Re:Kessoku Band
| Chart (2024) | Position |
|---|---|
| Japanese Albums (Oricon) | 10 |

=== Year-end charts ===
Year-end chart performance for Re:Kessoku Band
| Chart (2024) | Position |
|---|---|
| Japanese Albums (Oricon) | 91 |
| Japanese Hot Albums (Billboard Japan) | 80 |

== Release history ==
Release dates and formats for Re:Kessoku Band
| Region | Date | Format(s) | Label | Ref. |
|---|---|---|---|---|
| Various | August 14, 2024 | Digital download; streaming | Aniplex | |
| Japan | August 14, 2024 | CD | Aniplex | |
| Japan | December 23, 2026 | Vinyl LP | Aniplex | |
