= Enhanced water =

Water with added ingredients

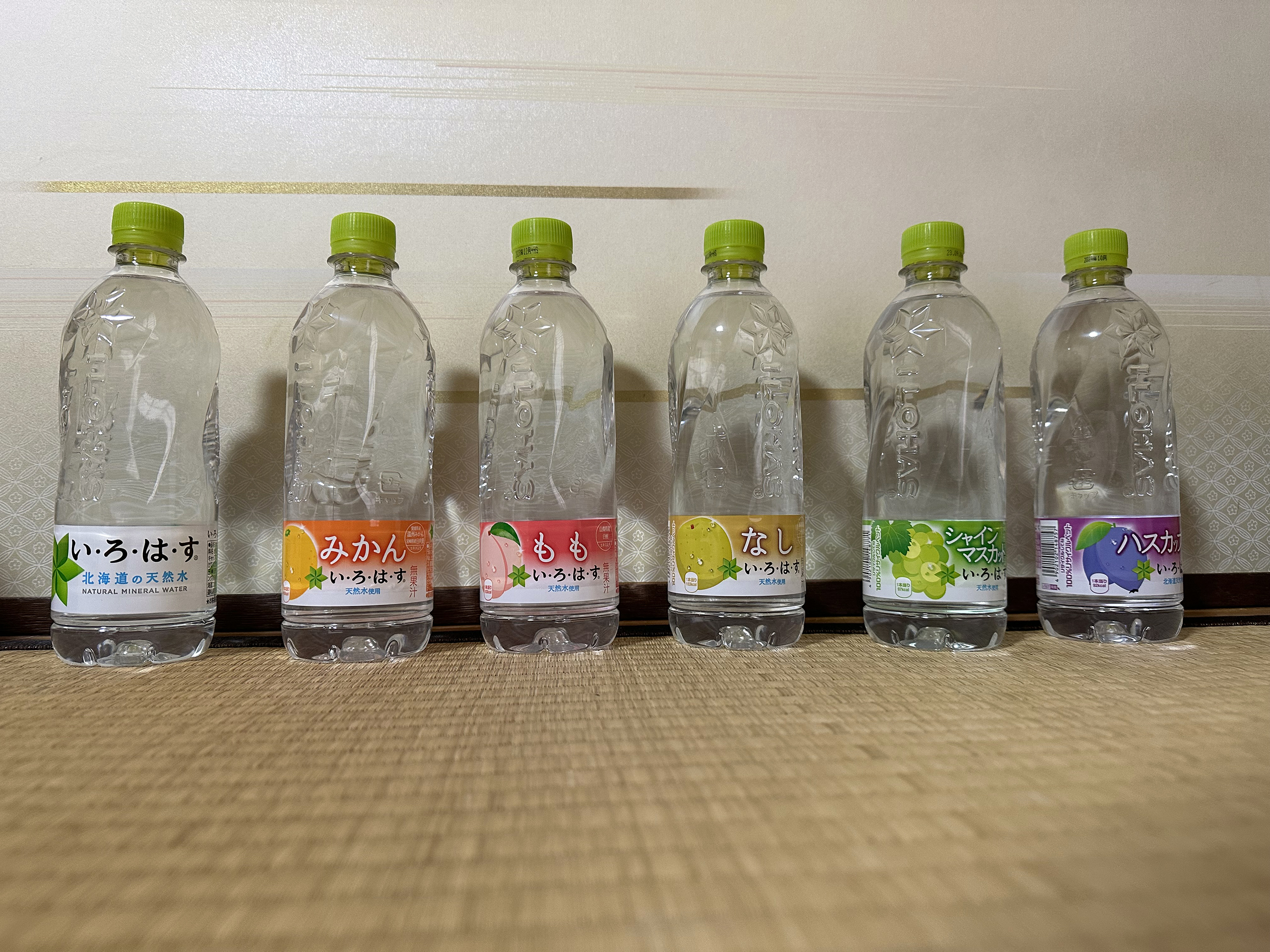
Bottles of I-Lohas water in various flavors

Enhanced water or flavored water is a category of non-carbonated beverages marketed as water with added ingredients such as flavoring, sweetener, and vitamins and minerals.

Manufacturers of soft drinks and bottled water sell enhanced water brands including Aquafina Flavorsplash, Propel, SoBe (by PepsiCo), flavored Dasani (by The Coca-Cola Company), Smartwater, and VitaminWater (by Coca-Cola subsidiary Glaceau).

== Marketing ==
Enhanced waters are generally marketed as health drinks, and generally contain less or no sugar compared to non-diet soft drinks. However they are not always sugar-free. For example a 500 mL bottle of Vitaminwater contains 22 g sugar, 44% of the daily value. In 2011, the UK's Advertising Standards Authority ruled it was misleading to advertise Vitaminwater as "nutritious" due to the high sugar content, and in 2009 Coca-Cola settled a class action lawsuit brought by the Center for Science in the Public Interest over deceptive health claims in the Vitaminwater advertising.

In 2007, enhanced water was the fastest-growing segment among still beverage sales. In 2001, flavored and enhanced water sales were estimated $80 million, and 2002 proved even more successful with $245 million in sales. The U.S. wholesale market for enhanced water was $170 million in 2004.

== Brands ==
Flavors and Calories of Enhanced Water Brands
Brand	Flavors	Calories per 8 US fl oz (240 ml) serving	Servings per container
Aquafina Flavorsplash	Grape, Wildberry, Strawberry-kiwi, Raspberry, Peach-mango, Lemon	0	2.5
Ayala's Herbal Water	Lemongrass mint vanilla, Lavender mint, Lemon verbena geranium, Cloves cardamom cinnamon, Cinnamon orange peel, Ginger lemon peel	0	2
Clearly Canadian	Mountain Blackberry, Orchard Peach, Wild Raspberry, Black Cherry	25	4
Dasani flavored water	Lemon, Strawberry, Grape, Raspberry	0	2.5
Fruit 2o Essentials	Cranberry Raspberry, Strawberry Kiwi, Peach Mango, Cherry Acai, Citrus, Blueberry Pomegranate	0	2.5
Hint	Cucumber, Raspberry-lime, Blackberry, Honeydew Hibiscus, Mango-grapefruit, Pomegranate-tangerine, Watermelon, Lime, Strawberry-kiwi, Pear	0	2
Skinny Water	Orange Cranberry Tangerine, Lemonade Passion Fruit, Raspberry Pomegranate, Goji Fruit Punch, Acai Grape Blueberry, Peach Mango Mandarin	0	2.5
Metromint	Peppermint, Spearmint, Lemonmint, Orangemint, Chocolatemint, Cherrymint	0	2
Obrilo	Sour Apple, Lemonade, Cherry Limeade, Concord Grape, Passion Fruit Orange Guava, Wonder Melon, Berry, Cranberry Peach, Lime Refresh, Lychee, Mango Grapefruit	0	30
Obrilo Hydration	Blue Raspberry, Unflavored, Watermelon, Strawberry Kiwi, Lemon Lime, Pineapple	0	30
Obrilo Energy	Charge Cherry, Electric Lemonade, Orange Popsicle, Strawberry Coconut, Peach Pulse	0	30
Owater	Original, Wild berries, Lemon & lime, Peach, Strawberry, Mandarin orange	0	2.5
Powerade	Orange Mountain berry blast Fruit punch Grape Lemon lime Sour melon White cherry Strawberry lemonade Mystic mountain blueberry		
Powerade Zero	Mixed berry Grape Strawberry Lemon lime Orange		
Propel	Lemon, Berry, Grape, Kiwi-strawberry, Blueberry-pomegranate, Black-cherry, Peach-mango	0	2.5
SoBe Lifewater	Agave Lemonade, Goji Melon, Orange Tangerine, Strawberry Kiwi, Pomegranate Cherry, Blackberry Grape	40	2.5
SoBe Lifewater zero	Cherimoya Punch, Strawberry Dragonfruit, Yumberry Pomegranate, Fuji Apple Pear, Black and Blue Berry, Mango Melon, Acai Fruit Punch	0	2.5
Twist Organics	Mandarin white tea, Marionberry, Mandarin, Peach, Lemon, Pomegranate blueberry, West indies lime, Mango acai	10	2.5
VitaminWater	Dragonfruit, Acai-blueberry-pomegranate, Fruit Punch, Orange-orange, Kiwi-strawberry, Grape, Raspberry-apple, Tropical Citrus, Lemonade, Berry-cherry, Grape-blueberry, Jackfruit-guava	50	2.5
VitaminWater Zero	Grape-Raspberry, Mixed Berry, Acai-Blueberry-Pomegranate, Peach-Mandarin, Orange, Green Tea, Lemonade, Dragonfruit, Fruit Punch, Strawberry-Kiwi, Strawberry-Guanabana	0	2.5
WaddaJuice	Apple, Wild berry, White grape	50	1
Zing Anything	Blackberry-Mint, Ginger-Peach, Orange, Lemon, Lime, Strawberry-Cucumber	0	2.5

== Ingredients ==
Ingredients used as enhancements in the water include hydroxycitric acid, chromium picolinate, epigallocatechin gallate, potassium, vitamin C, vitamin B_{6} and vitamin B_{12}.

== See also ==
- Drink mix
- Sports drink
