= VEEN =

Finnish drink company

Coordinates: 66.339497°N 23.919177°E

VEEN Waters Finland
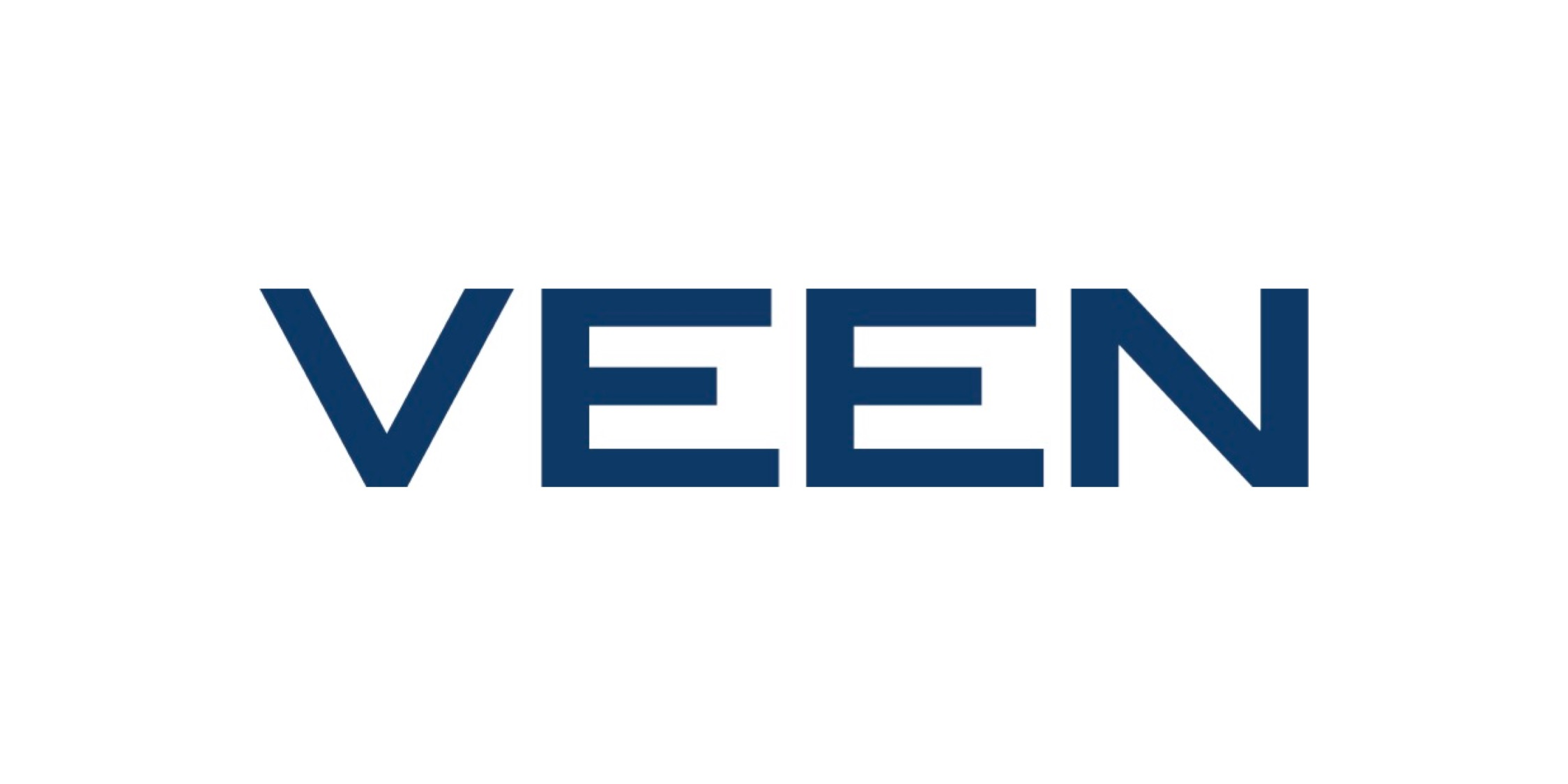
- Company type: Private limited company
- Industry: Drink industry
- Founded: December 2006; 19 years ago in Ylitornio, Finland
- Headquarters: Kopanmäentie 583, Ylitornio, Finland
- Key people: Aman Gupta (CEO)
- Products: Velvet, Effervescent (Natural Spring Bottled Water); Still, Classic (Natural Mineral Bottled Water); Nordic Mixers (Drink mixer); VEEN Ayurveda Water (Enhanced water); VEEN Ayurveda Super Shot (Organic Juice Shot)
- Production output: Konisaajo, Finland & Samtse, Kingdom of Bhutan
- Revenue: ▲€2.3 million (2018)
- Number of employees: 54 (2018)
- Website: veenwaters.com

VEEN is a Finnish premium beverage brand focusing on waters and natural, unprocessed drinks.

== Company ==
VEEN is a premium Finnish beverage brand, established in December 2006. The brand name comes from Veen Emonen (Mother of the Water) that is introduced in the Finnish national epic Kalevala.

VEEN is produced and marketed by VEEN Waters Finland Oy Ltd, a private company headquartered in Ylitornio, Finland. At inception, the company's key people were Managing Director Tomi Grönfors, Marketing and Sales Director Mikko Nikkilä and Operations Director Ville Hvitfelt. The brand was acquired from the original founders in January 2012 and the overall management, strategy and operations was taken over by the current ownership, which is family run and funded. Today, the VEEN brand and business is operated as a group of three companies with two individual water sources and two bottling plants, catering to 16 different countries.

== Products ==
VEEN bottles spring water in Finnish Lapland. Characterized by low mineral content (17.22 mg/L), the water is filtered through an ice age till at the Konisaajo natural spring area, where VEEN bottles VEEN Velvet (natural spring water) and VEEN Effervescent (gently sparkling spring water) products. The products are packaged in recyclable glass bottles, and are positioned as "culinary" products due to low mineral content.

VEEN Still & Classic are natural mineral water products from Bhutan. The products are packaged exclusively in recyclable glass bottles and are positioned as "hydration, rejuvenation & replenishment" products. VEEN Nordic Mixers were launched in late 2017 and positioned as a premium Nordic Mixer range which includes four products: Nordic Tonic Water, Nordic Soda Water, Nordic Ginger Ale, Nordic Bitter Lemon. VEEN Ayurveda Water is positioned as functional wellness drink with natural plant, fruit & botanical infusions inspired by Ayurveda. Ayurveda Super Shot is an extension to the Ayurveda range and is a 100 mL organic juice shot with natural plant, fruit and botanical juices inspired by Ayurveda.
