= Karlsberg (brewery) =

Brewery in Germany

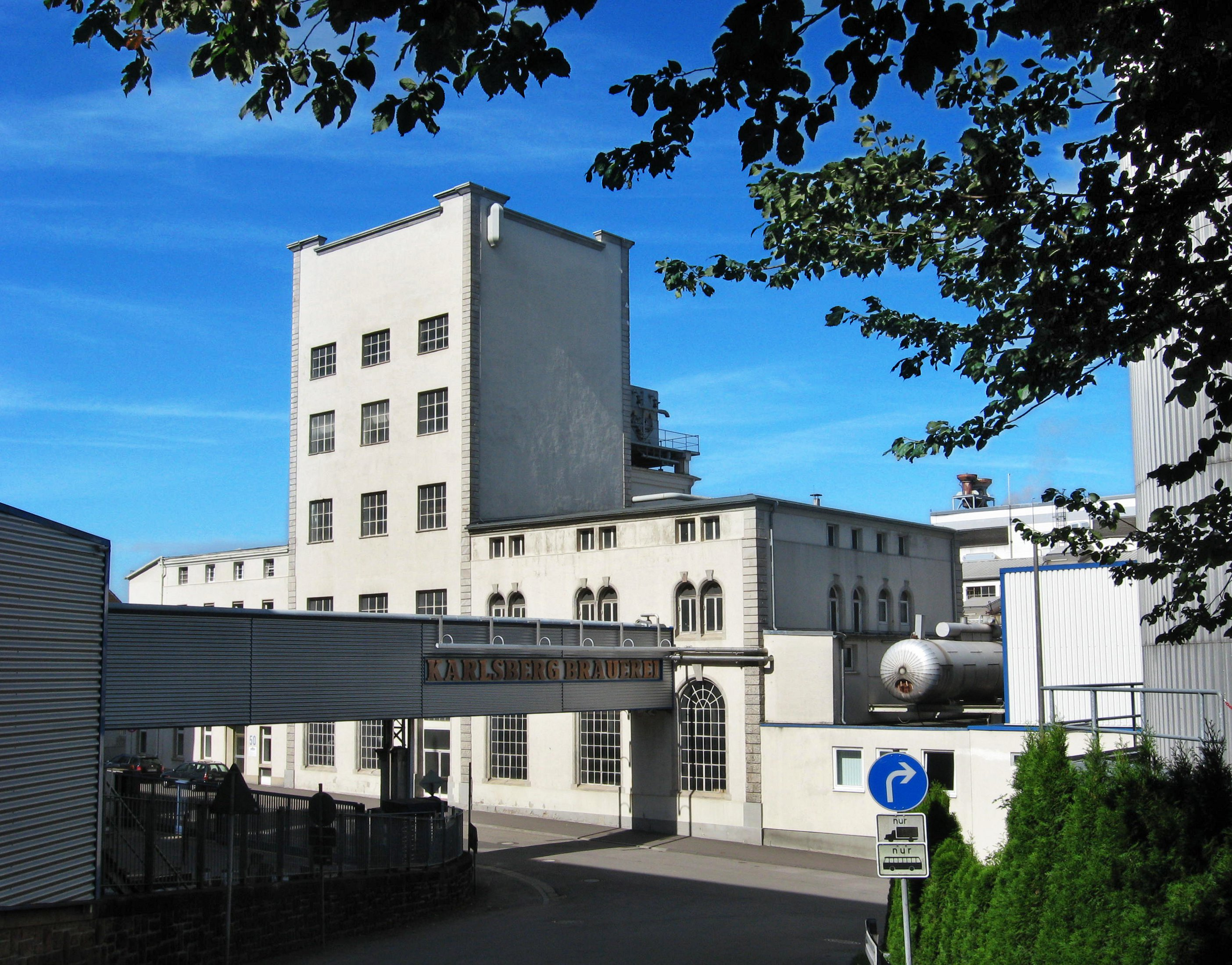
A view of the older parts of the brewery on Karlsbergstraße

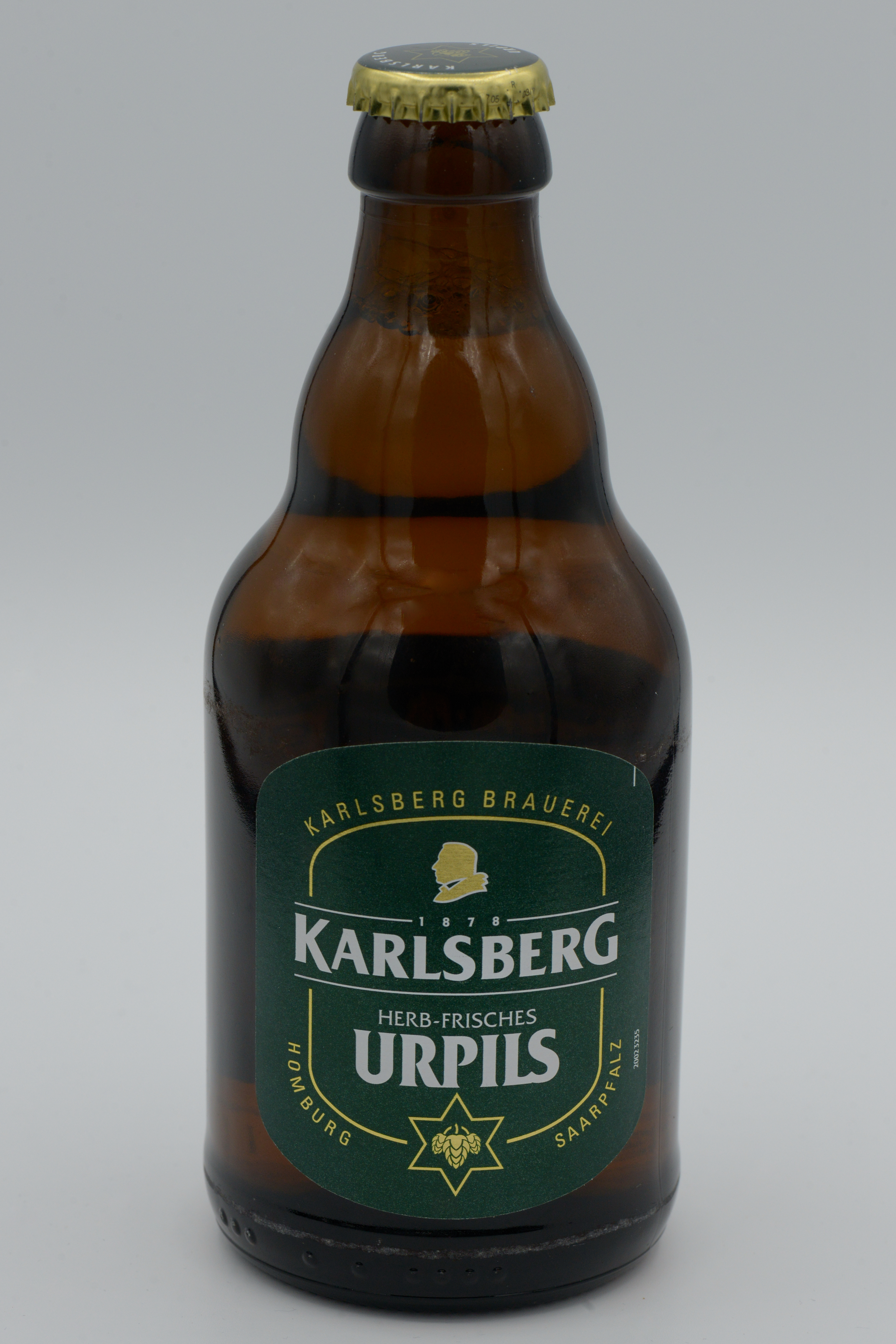

Karlsberg (German pronunciation: [ˈkaʁlsˌbɛɐ̯k]; Palatine German pronunciation: [ˈkaːls.bɛɐ̯ɕ]) is one of the largest breweries in Germany; the Karlsberg Group also owns various other beer brands. It is called Karlsbräu outside of Germany to differentiate it from the Danish brewing company Carlsberg.

== History ==
Established 1878 in the town of Homburg, Saarland (then part of Bavaria), the brewery was named after the nearby Karlsberg Castle. Karlsberg's ownership has been handed down through generations. The current owner, Richard Weber, is the great-grandson of the brewery's founder.

== Brands ==
Karlsberg's brands include Karlsberg, Beckers, Ottweiler and Kasteel which includes Kasteel Cru, a lager brewed in Saverne using champagne yeast.

== Karlsberg Group ==
The Karlsberg Group also owns and distributes other beer brands, among them the German brewery Königsbacher (in Koblenz) and the French brewery Brasserie de Saverne. The juice producers Merziger, Klindworth and Niehoffs Vaihinger belong to the company. In 2001 Karlsberg acquired controlling interest in the Mineralbrunnen Überkingen-Teinach company from Nestlé, including Afri-Cola and the mineral water brands Staatlich Fachingen and Hirschquelle from the Black Forest. Alcohol-free drinks today make up more than 50% of the company's turnover (of 691 million euros in the fiscal year 2004/05).

== See also ==
- Beer in France
- List of brewing companies in Germany
