= Michale =

Village in Kociewie

- Village
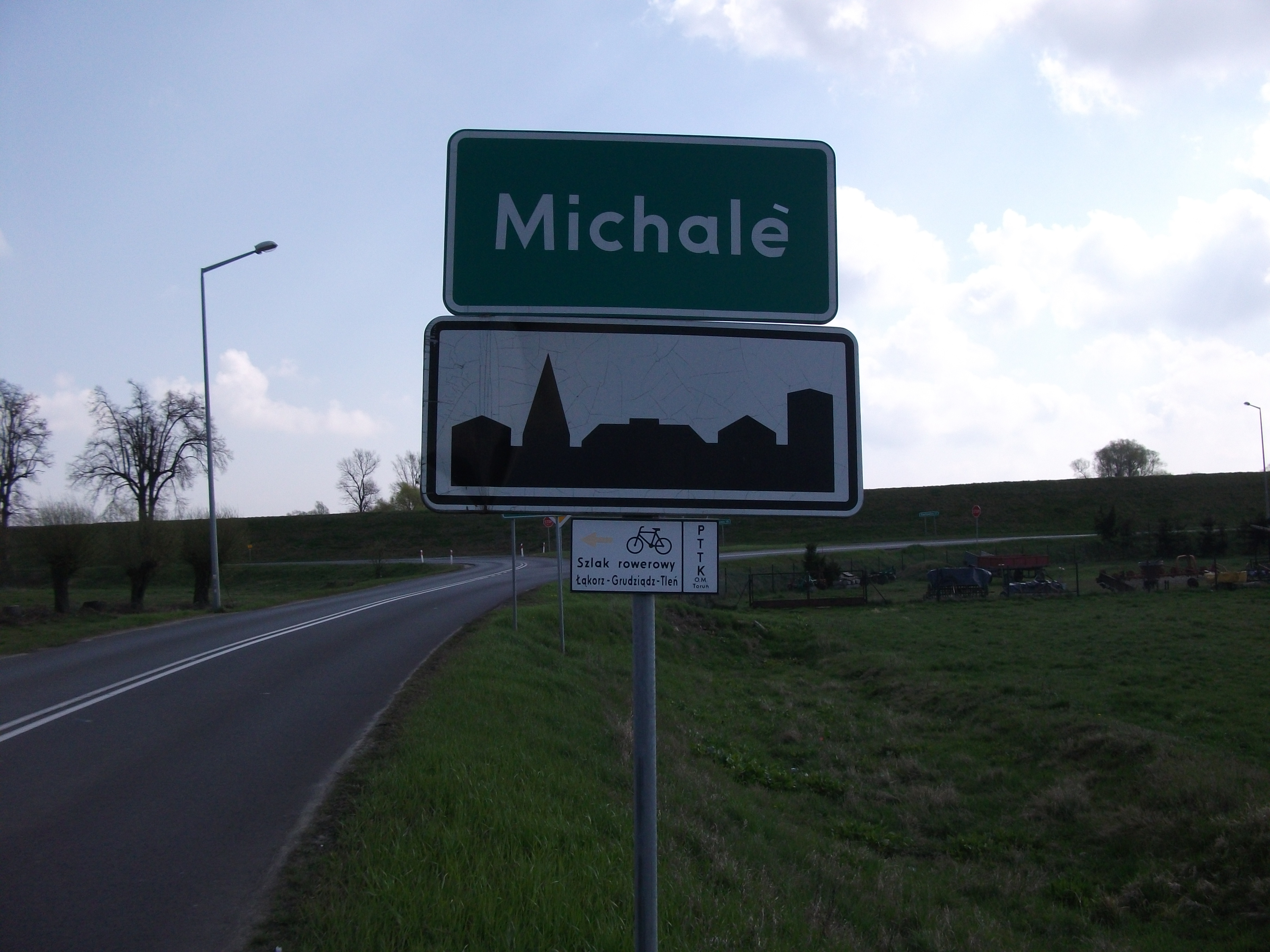

- Location within Poland
- Coordinates: 53°29′N 18°44′E
- Country: Poland
- Voivodeship: Kuyavian-Pomeranian
- County: Świecie
- Gmina: Dragacz

Michale [miˈxalɛ] is a village in the administrative district of Gmina Dragacz, within Świecie County, Kuyavian-Pomeranian Voivodeship, in north-central Poland. Michale is located within the ethnocultural region of Kociewie.

== Notable residents ==
- Karl Wilhelm Krause (1911–2001), valet and bodyguard to Adolf Hitler
