= Mohai Agnes mineral water =

The spring of Mohai Agnes is in Hungary in Fejér county next to the Bakony hill in Moha village.

Moha is located on the central part of the Fejér county, to the north from Székesfehérvár. The Agnes-spring can be found in the north gate of the 2–4 km long ditch of between the Bakony and the Vértes. The most part of the region is well known of the high ground water level and the known and hiding springs.

== History ==
The first records were made in 1374. Between the people was known as ”Aldokut” (Blessing well) nowadays it is called as Agnes-spring.

The first chemical analysis of the water was made in 1810 that has known so far. After that in 1835 in Leipzig and in 1876 in Stuttgart was written again from the Mohai Agnes. In 1880 the Hungarian Academy of Sciences supported the knowing of the water.

According to the chemical analysis the main components are the following: the calcium carbonate, magnesium, sodium, potassium, lithium, iron oxide, calcium sulfate, silicic acid and titanic acid. This latter one - the analysis emphasizes - is especial, since it is very rare. Similar ones are noted about a Norway mineral water only. Regarding to the curing effects the Mohai Agnes is good for respiratory and digestive diseases. On 11.2 °C enriched with natural carbon dioxide has been known since the 14th century. The Mohai Agnes mineral water contains various mineral each of which is present in natural, ionic form, but there are several other characteristics that make this high-quality drink stand out from other mineral water distributed in Hungary.

Thanks to the hard work of Amade Tadde, the Bajzáth family and Imre Kempelen, the exploration of the spring and starting of bottling, the Mohai Agnes mineral water is popular throughout the country and well known in Europe wide. The distribution of the mineral water started in the 19th century and was growing continuously until the World War I.

After the political transformation and the privatization the Elore Mezogazdasagi Termelo es Szolgaltato Szovetkezet (Forward Agricultural Producer and Service provider Co-operative) bottled the Mohai Agnes. In 1999 the Karsai Holding Plc. obtained the majority property and in August 2000 the Mohai Agnes Ltd. was launched by Karsai. In 2005 the Mohai Agnes was sold to the Uniresal Food Ltd. and the mineral water appeared on the shelves of the CBA branches. After the remarkable investments and modernizations in 2008 the liquidation began.

== Contains ==
- Calcium: 339 mg/l
- Magnesium: 67 mg/l
- Bicarbonate: 1452 mg/l
- Potassium: 11,4 mg/l
- Sodium: 21 mg/l
  - Nitrite: 0 ;mg/l
  - Nitrate : 0 ;mg/l

1993
