= Highland Spring =

Scottish supplier of bottled water

- Country: United Kingdom (Scotland)
- Produced by: Highland Spring Ltd.
- Introduced: 1979
- Tagline: Water As Nature Intended
- Source: Ochil Hills
- Type: Still, Sparkling, Flavoured
- pH: 7.8
- Calcium (Ca): 40.5
- Chloride (Cl): 6.1
- Magnesium (Mg): 10.1
- Nitrate (NO_{3}): 3.1
- Potassium (K): 0.7
- Sodium (Na): 5.6
- Sulfate (SO_{4}): 5.3
- TDS: 170
- Website: www.highlandspring.com
- All concentrations in milligrams per liter (mg/L); pH without units

Highland Spring is a Scottish company that supplies natural source bottled water. The company produces still, sparkling and flavoured water at its factory in Blackford, Perth and Kinross. Despite its name, the location is situated outside the traditional boundaries of the Scottish Highlands. It is owned by Emirati born businessman Mahdi Al Tajir

== Sources ==
Its water is sourced from 2,500 acres of private, organic land in the Ochil Hills.

== History ==
Highland Spring was incorporated in 1979, and bottled its first product in 1980.

== Operations ==
Highland Spring produces its products from a production site in Blackford, Perth and Kinross. It bottled its first product in 1980. In 2010 Highland Spring acquired a production site in Lennoxtown from Greencore which produces supermarket private-label bottled water.

In 2017, Highland Spring opened a new production line which was officially opened by The Queen.

In January 2019, Highland Spring became the first UK water brand to launch a 100% recycled PET plastic bottle.

In April 2024, Highland Spring launched a flavoured water range.

== Market ==
In 2023, Highland Spring sold 404.1 million litres of Highland Spring-branded water in the United Kingdom which equates to <2% of the rainfall on the catchment area.

== Rail Terminal ==
In August 2022 the business opened a rail freight facility adjacent to its headquarters in Blackford which became fully operational in January 2023.
