= Whistler Water =

Canadian bottled water brand

- Country: Canada
- Source: Place Glacier, British Columbia
- Type: Glacial Spring Water
- pH: 7.2 ±
- Calcium (Ca): 9.3
- Chloride (Cl): 0
- Bicarbonate (HCO_{3}): 28
- Magnesium (Mg): 0.9
- Nitrate (NO_{3}): 0
- Potassium (K): 0.5
- Sodium (Na): 1.3
- Sulfate (SO_{4}): 6.6
- TDS: 36 P.P.M.
- Website: whistlerwater.com
- All concentrations in milligrams per liter (mg/L); pH without units

Whistler Water is a manufacturer and supplier of bottled water. Their water originates from mountains just north of Whistler in British Columbia, Canada and is bottled a short distance away in Burnaby, British Columbia. Whistler Water has been supplying their products for over 25 years.

== History ==
Whistler Water's original source was located at Function Junction (British Columbia Highway 99 at Cheakamus Valley Road) in Whistler, British Columbia, and was used from 1991 to 1992 before it was moved to a secondary source because of industrial intrusion. Whistler Water, since 1992, has been sourced from Place Glacier outside Whistler, British Columbia. In 1997, Whistler Water introduced the Whistler Glacial Spring Water 'mountain bottle' packaging and began targeting export markets aggressively.

== Sources ==
Whistler Pure Glacial Spring Water is sourced from the glaciers located in the Coast Mountains just north of Whistler, British Columbia.

Geography

Whistler Water Inc. obtains its water from an aquifer located at the foothill of remote mountains that are part of the Pacific Range of the Coast Mountains in British Columbia. The Coast Mountains Coast Mountains comprise many of the world's largest temperate-latitude icecaps and glaciers. Most of the land in the range is tightly controlled Crown Land on which all activities are rigorously regulated by the Provincial Government, keeping both the glacier and the aquifer highly protected from human and industrial contamination.

== Bottling ==
Whistler Water's bottling facility in Burnaby, British Columbia is also co-packer for private label customers, as well as a number of international private label bottle brands and carbonated products. Bottle sizes are 350 mL, 500 mL, 500 mL sport cap, 1 L, 1L sport cap, 1.5 L and a 4 L jug.
