= Deep River Rock =

Irish water brand

Deep RiverRock is a brand of water produced by Coca-Cola, bottled in County Antrim and sold throughout the island of Ireland.

Deep RiverRock went on the market in 1994, Since 2006 it has been a sponsor of the Belfast City Marathon.

== See also ==
- List of Coca-Cola brands
- List of bottled water brands
