= Jamnica =

Jamnica can refer to:

- Jamnica, Lesser Poland Voivodeship, a village in Poland
- Jamnica, Subcarpathian Voivodeship, a village in Poland
- Jamnica, Prevalje, a village near Prevalje, Slovenia
- Jamnica (company), a water company from Croatia
