= Apenta =

Hungarian aperient water

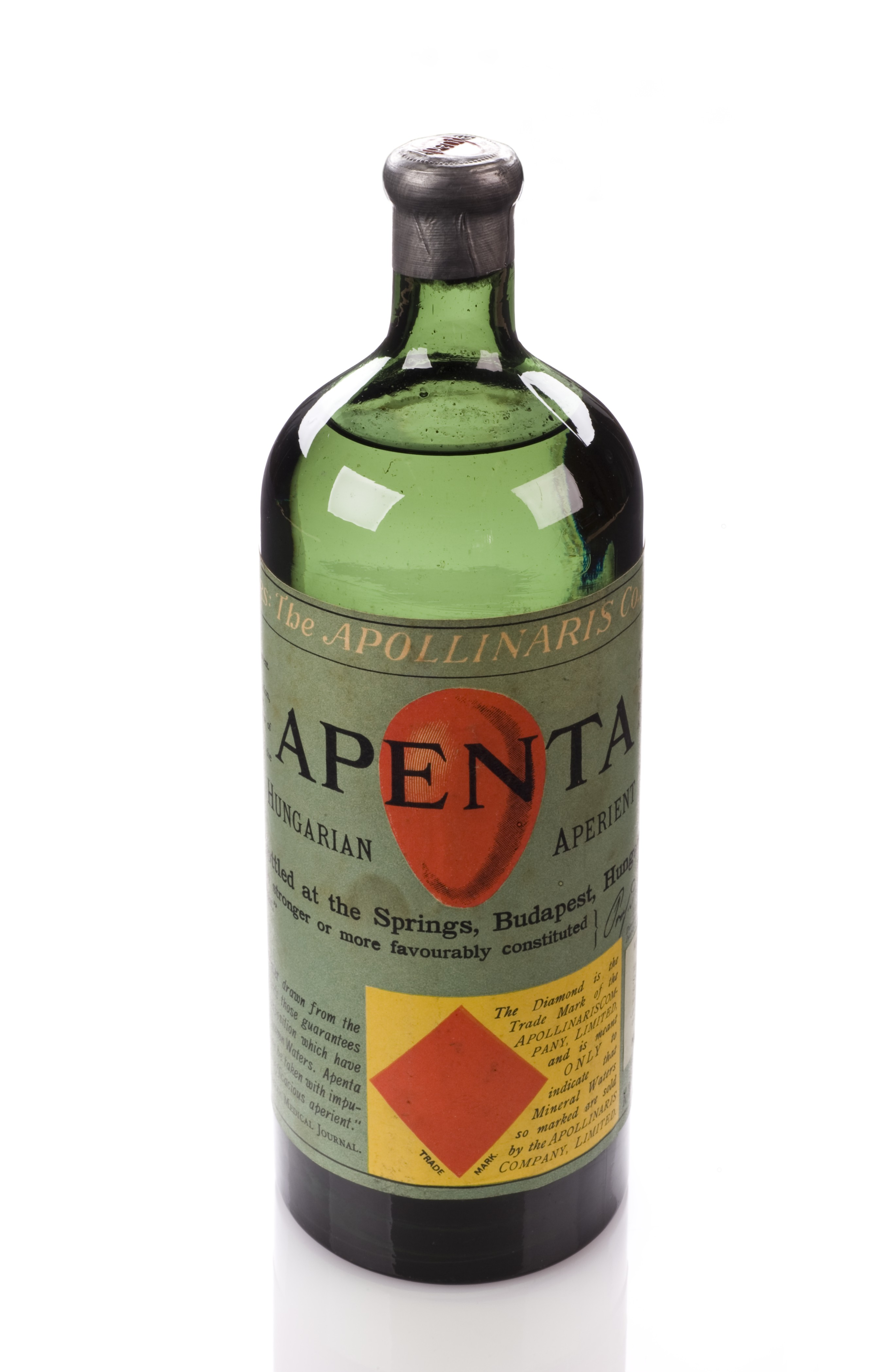
Pre-1940 bottle. Credit: Wellcome Collection

Apenta is a still and sparkling Hungarian aperient water. Its principal constituents are sulphates of magnesia and soda. The water's source were the Uj Hunyadi springs in Buda.

== See also ==
- Mineral water
