= Propel Water =

American flavored bottled water brand

Propel
- Type: Zero Calorie Nutrient Enhanced Water Beverage
- Manufacturer: Gatorade
- Origin: United States
- Introduced: 2002; 24 years ago
- Website: www.propelwater.com

Propel Water is an American brand of flavored bottled water that is marketed as containing electrolytes, antioxidants, and vitamins. It is a beverage product of Gatorade and is marketed by PepsiCo.

== Ingredients ==
The water often contains, along with water, citric acid, sodium hexametaphosphate, natural flavor, salt, potassium sorbate, ascorbic acid (vitamin C), sucralose, sodium citrate, potassium citrate, acesulfame potassium, niacinamide (vitamin B3), Calcium disodium EDTA, vitamin E acetate, calcium pantothenate (vitamin B5), and pyridoxine hydrochloride (vitamin B6).

== History ==
Propel Fitness Water was introduced in 2002 by Gatorade. In 2005, Gatorade introduced Propel Calcium. In the summer of 2006, Gatorade introduced Propel powder packets: a dry powder mix of Propel, where the contents of a powder packet are added to a 500 ml (16.9 oz) bottle of water. Propel powder with calcium launched in January 2010. In early 2009, Gatorade changed the bottle design, and began using bottles containing 30% less plastic than their predecessors.

In 2023, PepsiCo formed a new portfolio connecting its sports and fitness drink brands under the Gatorade umbrella. Propel was included in this umbrella. In 2023, Propel partnered with Michael B. Jordan for the drink rebrand.

== Products ==
The brand carries multiple fruit flavors and includes a line of protein drinks.
