= Naya Waters =

Canadian water bottling company

Naya Waters Inc.
- Industry: Food industry
- Founded: 1986; 40 years ago
- Headquarters: Mirabel, Quebec, Canada
- Key people: Daniel Cotte (President)
- Products: Bottled water
- Website: naya.com/en

Naya Waters Inc. is a Canadian company that bottles natural spring water from a spring in the Laurentian Mountains in southern Quebec. The water is sold under the brand name Naya.

The name Naya comes from the Naiads, who are a type of spirit in Greek Mythology that presided over certain bodies of fresh water such as springs and streams.

In March 2021, Naya Waters returned to being a 100% Québec-owned and operated company after being acquired by Champlain Financial Corporation and GefCo.

== Company history ==
Naya's founders searched for five years before finding the Naya spring at the foot of the Laurentians in Mirabel, just north of Montreal. In 1986, the plant was opened at the same location to ensure the water was bottled as close to the spring as possible.

Since August 1995, NAYA has also operated a water bottling facility in the Selkirk Mountains of Revelstoke, British Columbia.

== Naya spring ==
The Naya spring is located in Mirabel, Quebec at the foot of the Laurentian mountains, which contain aquifers that have formed over millions of years. Naya water is drawn from an aquifer located at a depth of over 30 metres deep.

== Environmental commitment ==
Naya states that it is committed to carbon footprint reduction, and recently introduced bottles made from 100% recycled plastic, specifically polyethylene terephthalate (rPET). This follows Naya introducing a 25% rPET packaging in 2008, followed soon after by a 50% recycled version. Since 2008, through its relationship with One Percent for the Planet, Naya has donated 1% of total revenues each year to programs advancing the protection of the environment. These funds finance a number of initiatives, such as the "NAYA Waterways Fund" which aims to revitalize aquatic habitats in urban areas as part of a partnership with the Fondation de la Faune du Québec (Quebec Wildlife Foundation).
