= Moha, Hungary =

Moha
- Location of Fejér county in Hungary

- Location of Moha, Hungary
- Coordinates: 47.24354°N 18.33212°E
- Country: Hungary
- County: Fejér

Area
  - Total: 9.88 km^{2} (3.81 sq mi)

Population (2004)
  - Total: 427
  - Density: 43.21/km^{2} (111.9/sq mi)
- Time zone: UTC+1 (CET)
  - Summer (DST): UTC+2 (CEST)
- Postal code: 8042
- Area code: 22
- Website: www.moha.hu

Moha (Hungarian pronunciation: [ˈmoɦɒ]) is a village in Fejér county, Hungary.
