= Ades (brand) =

Brand of beverage

- Type: Bottled water (Indonesia); Soy-based beverage (Latin America)
- Manufacturer: The Coca-Cola Company
- Origin: Indonesia (bottled water); Argentina (soy-based beverage)

AdeS is a brand of two different beverage products owned and produced by The Coca-Cola Company. In Indonesia, it is a bottled water while in Latin America, it is a soy-based beverage. In Japan, the bottled water product is also known as I-Lohas. The name for the soy-based beverage product comes from the Spanish acronym, "Alimentos de Soja" which means "food made from soybean". The soy-based beverage product currently has a presence in Brazil, Mexico, Argentina, Uruguay, Paraguay, Bolivia, Chile and Colombia.

== History ==
The soy-based beverage product was created in Argentina in 1988. The Coca-Cola Company entered into an agreement with Unilever on June 1, 2016, to acquire AdeS in Latin America. The bottled water product is currently made by PT Coca-Cola Bottling Indonesia in Bekasi, West Java, which also produces Coca-Cola, Fanta and Sprite.

== See also ==
- Cool Ridge
- Pump
- List of bottled water brands
