= Dasani =

Bottled water brand

- Logo used since May 1, 2024

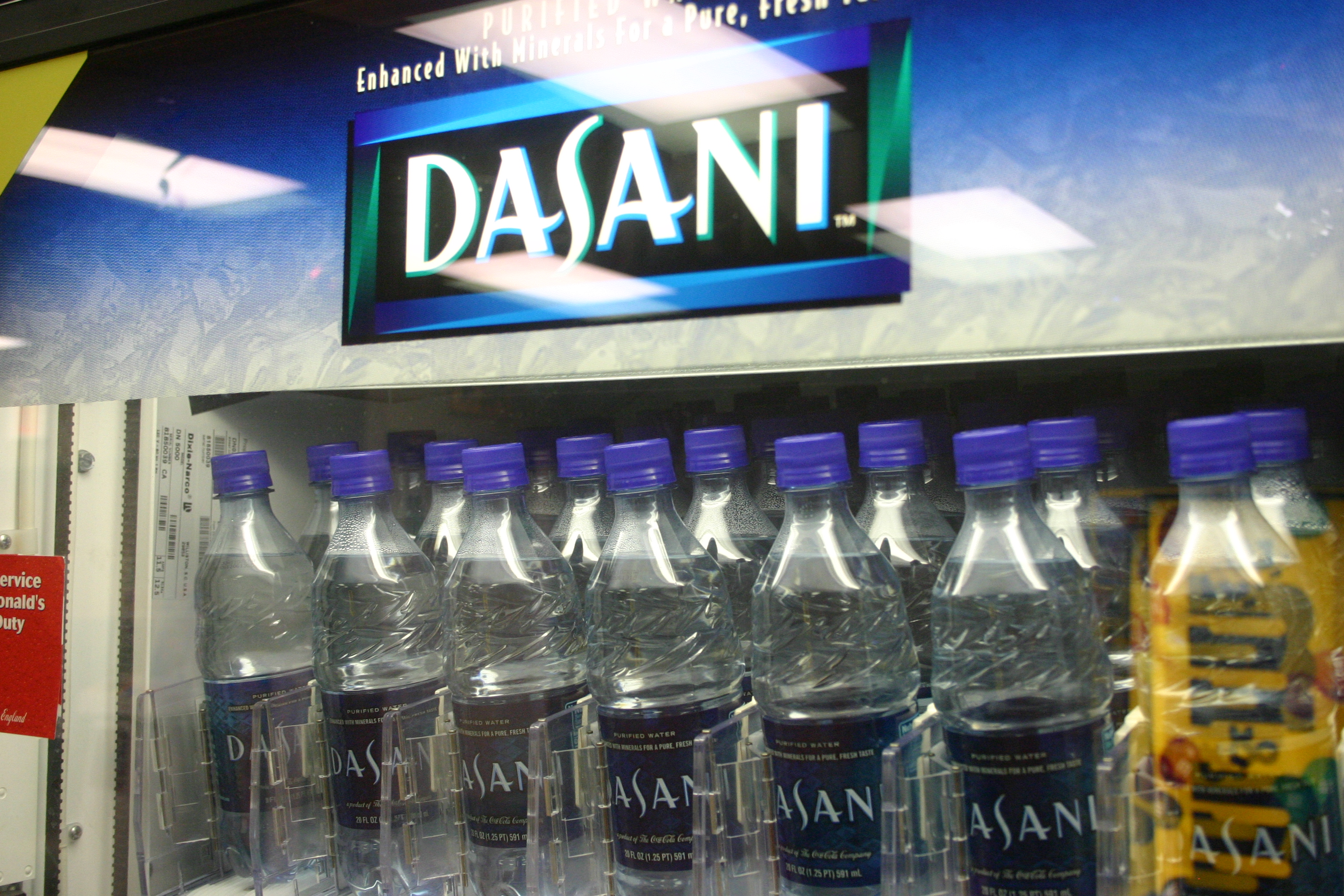
- Dasani vending machine, manufactured by Dixie-Narco
- Type: Water beverage
- Manufacturer: The Coca-Cola Company
- Origin: United States
- Introduced: 19 February 1999; 27 years ago
- Website: dasani.com

Dasani (/dəˈsɑːni/) is a brand of bottled water created by the Coca-Cola Company, launched in 1999. It is one of many brands of Coca-Cola bottled water sold around the world. The product is filtered and bottled.

Previous logo, from 1999

== Marketing ==
=== United States ===
Coca-Cola uses water from local municipal water supplies, filters it using the process of reverse osmosis, and adds trace amounts of minerals, including magnesium sulfate (Epsom salt), potassium chloride and sodium chloride (table salt).

Coca-Cola announced in 2009 that they would be distributing Dasani water in new packaging comprising 30% plant-derived plastics. Unlike other plant-based packaging, the bottles are compatible with standard recycling plants and represent up to a 25% reduction in carbon emissions compared to standard water bottles, though this still represents an energy consumption two thousand times that of tap water.

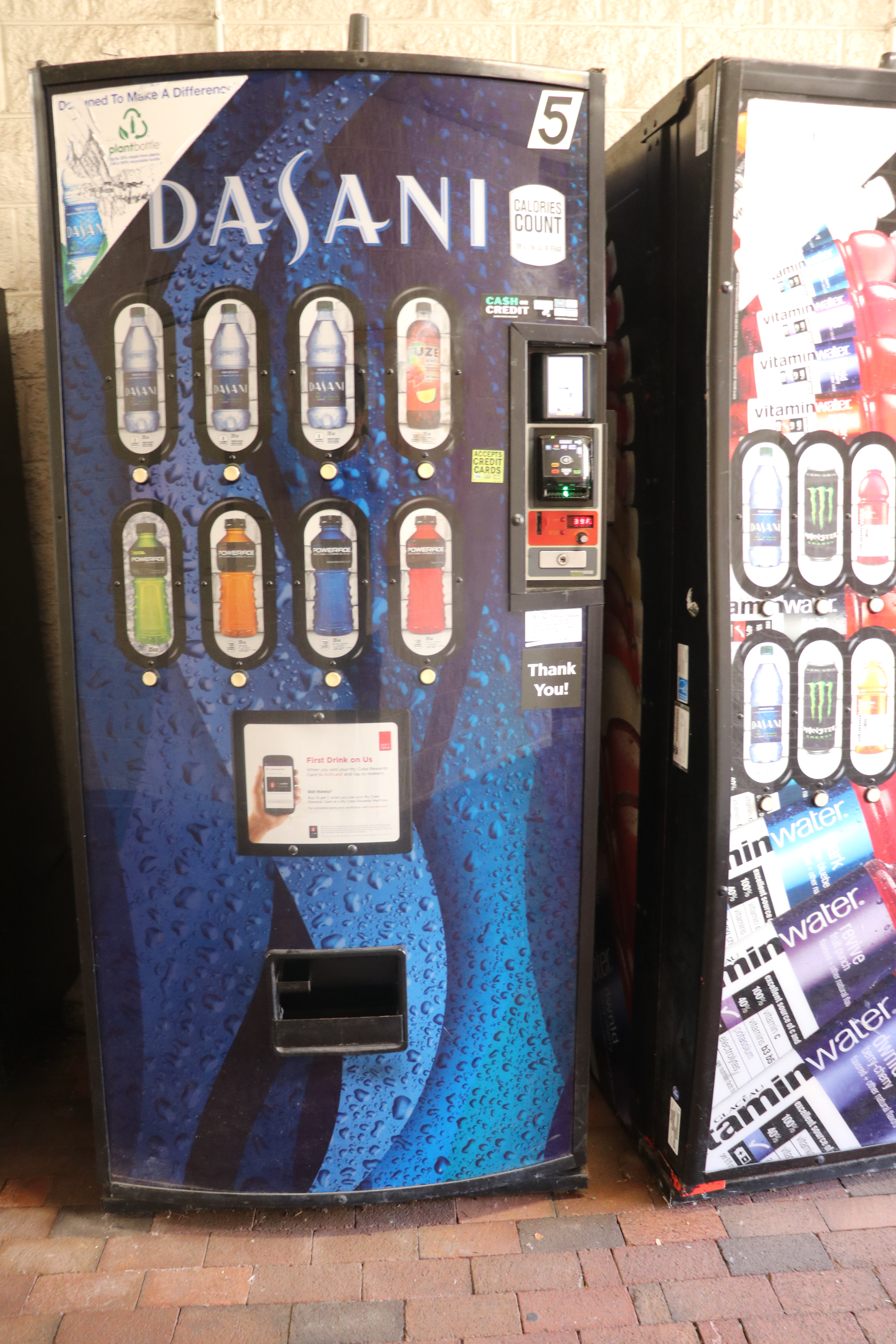
Vending machine seen at Liberty Village Outlet, Flemington, New Jersey

=== Canada ===
Dasani was launched in all provinces of Canada except Quebec in 2000, a year after launching in the United States. The brand was made available in Quebec shortly afterwards, in April 2001.

There are six common Dasani bottle sizes sold in Canada: 355 mL (12 US fl oz), 500mL, 591 mL (20 US fl oz), 710 mL (24 US fl oz), 1 L, and 1.5 L. Bottles are sold individually and in packs of 6, 12, and 24.

The first Dasani bottling plant in Canada was in Calgary, Alberta. A second plant was later opened in Brampton, Ontario. The Calgary and Brampton plants produce Coca-Cola's plain-water (Dasani) and sugar-water (soft drinks) products. The company's administrative and marketing activities continue to be based in Atlanta, Georgia.

Dasani has <35 ppm of total dissolved mineral salts.

=== Latin America ===
Dasani was introduced to the Brazilian market in mid-2003, renamed as Aquarius. It was introduced to the Chilean market in 2005, including releases in regular, lemon and tangerine flavors. It was released in Colombia in late 2005 with their three regular flavors. In 2005, Dasani was introduced in the Argentinian market with the flavours peach, lemon, citrus and regular. It was also released under the name Ciel Dasani in Mexico in four flavours: lemon-cucumber, papaya-carrot, grapefruit and mandarin-green tea, but it was discontinued in 2006. It was also released in Peru, Ecuador, Paraguay, Uruguay and Honduras.

=== United Kingdom ===
Dasani was launched in the UK on 10 February 2004. The product launch was labelled "a disaster", a "fiasco", and a "PR catastrophe".

Prior to the launch, an article in The Grocer trade magazine had stated that the source of the Dasani brand water was treated tap water from Sidcup, a suburban area on the outskirts of London. By early March 2004, the mainstream press had picked up the story and it became widely reported that Sidcup tap water, after being processed, was being sold under the Dasani brand name in the UK. Although Coca-Cola never stated that the water was being sourced from a spring or other natural sources, they marketed it as being especially "pure". This led the Food Standards Agency (FSA) to request Hillingdon trading standards officers to launch an investigation into whether the claim was accurate.

On 18 March 2004, UK authorities found a batch was contaminated with levels of bromate, a suspected human carcinogen, in a concentration above the legal limit for sale, although the FSA announced there was "no immediate risk to public health" from the contamination. Coca-Cola immediately recalled half a million bottles and withdrew the "Dasani" brand from the UK market.

The launch, and later contamination scandal, drew comparisons in the press with a 1992 episode of the sitcom Only Fools and Horses, "Mother Nature's Son" in which lead character Del Boy (David Jason) hatches a scheme selling tap water bottled in his council flat in Peckham—nine miles from Sidcup. As a result, Coca-Cola cancelled plans to expand the brand to continental Europe.

In line with the 2012 Summer Olympics and being the official drink sponsor, Coca-Cola decided not to reintroduce the Dasani brand to the UK market, and purchased the Morpeth, Northumberland-based Abbey Well bottler in 2008, branded under the Schweppes brand name (to which Coca-Cola holds the UK rights), to provide a locally sourced water brand for the event. To meet Olympic branding regulations, Abbey Well water was labeled as "Still Water" for on-camera appearances during the Games.

=== Africa ===
Dasani has authorised the Hyper Psaro group to bottle, distribute, and produce branded bottled water in Lubumbashi, Democratic Republic of the Congo. Nonetheless, the logo and packaging appears different than that of those products in the United States, though it is still considered a Coca-Cola product.

== Water sources and purification process ==
=== Sources ===
Dasani is largely sourced from municipal supplies (tap water) and then filtered in bottled water plants before being bottled. Places Dasani sources its water from include: California, Minnesota, Arizona, Colorado, and Michigan. Dasani also bottles internationally, in locations such as Kent in the United Kingdom and Malaysia.

=== Filtration and purification process ===
This filtration process consists of a multi-barrier treatment system, reverse osmosis, and nanofiltration to remove impurities. Coca-Cola claims that this process provides a consistent taste, though the content within the bottles may vary across the world, depending on their source, despite frequent testing to ensure they meet FDA standards for purified water. Some states allow bottled water plants to meet Safe Drinking Water Act standards instead, so not even all Dasani bottles may be held to the same standard.

=== Environmental issues ===
Dasani sources water from municipal pool water in California locations, even during drought years. Coca-Cola is not required to report how much water it processes and bottles at these plants. Bottled water is an exception to the rule about how much water can be taken out of the Great Lakes Basin. Bottled water takes extra energy to produce from filtration, production of bottles, and transportation costs.

== Sustainability ==
=== Aluminum bottles and cans ===
In the summer of 2019, Coke announced that Dasani would become available in aluminum cans. This new line began in the Northeast US in September, and should spread through the rest of the US in 2020. This will not entirely replace their production of plastic bottles. Whether this is environmentally beneficial can be argued: aluminum is more often and more efficiently recycled, but producing one aluminum can produce 1,300g carbon dioxide emissions, which is much more than the 330g it takes to produce one plastic bottle of the same size. Less power is needed to transport and refrigerate canned beverages, which reduces the carbon footprints of cans. Additionally, although 69% of aluminum cans are recycled worldwide, this percentage is significantly lower for plastic.

=== PureFill ===
In 2019, Coke announced Dasani Purefill, a program in which customers can refill their bottles with filtered water for free. Adding flavors or carbonation will cost extra. This is predicted to reduce the number of bottles used.

=== PlantBottle ===
Coke released a Dasani bottle composed of both plants and recycled plastic, which they say will reduce their plastic bottle production by 1 billion plastic bottles over the next 5 years. This PlantBottle is still recyclable, just like PET plastic. The composition of this bottle will be up to 50% recycled plastic, up to 30% plants, and new plastic. This makes Coca-Cola the largest bioplastic user in the world. Coca-Cola plans to eventually switch to 100% bio-plastic bottles.

=== Carbon footprint ===
Having multiple bottling water facilities across the world reduces energy used for transportation. Cans have a larger carbon footprint than plastic bottles, so this switch to aluminum cans may overall increase Dasani's carbon footprint.

=== "How2Recycle" Labels ===
In 2020, Dasani will premier new labels for their bottles with instructions on recycling, referred to as "How2Recycle" labels. The "How2Recycle" label was invented by the Sustainable Packaging Coalition and GreenBlue, and can already be found on other products.

== Health issues and water contaminants ==
Dasani water has been found to contain microplastics. Microplastics may be linked to diabetes, heart disease, obesity, cancer, reproductive problems, and attention deficit disorder and many more disorders/diseases.

== Public litter issues ==
=== Grand Canyon ===
In 2011, plastic bottles accounted for 30% of the waste in the Grand Canyon, where Dasani water was the water sold by the parks. The Grand Canyon officially banned sales of bottled water in 2012.

== See also ==
- Deep River Rock – a brand of tap water, produced by Coca-Cola, sold throughout Ireland
