= Cool Ridge =

Australian brand of spring water

- Type: Spring water
- Manufacturer: Schweppes Australia
- Origin: Australia
- Introduced: 1981; 45 years ago
- Related products: Pump, Spring Water
- Website: http://www.coolridge.com.au/

Cool Ridge Water is a brand of spring water. It is a division of Schweppes Australia.

== See also ==
- List of bottled water brands
