= Spa (mineral water) =

Brand of mineral water

Spa Reine
- Country: Belgium
- Produced by: Spadel Group
- Source: Reine Source
- Type: flat
- pH: 6
- Calcium (Ca): 4.5
- Chloride (Cl): 5
- Bicarbonate (HCO_{3}): 15
- Magnesium (Mg): 1.3
- Nitrate (NO_{3}): 1.9
- Potassium (K): 0.5
- Silica (SiO_{2}): 7
- Sodium (Na): 3
- Sulfate (SO_{4}): 4
- TDS: 33
- Website: https://www.spa.be
- All concentrations in milligrams per liter (mg/L); pH without units

Spa is a brand of mineral water from Spa, Belgium, and is owned by the Spadel Group. Spa mineral water has been bottled since the end of the 16th century and is very common in Western Europe and especially in the Benelux countries. It is also exported to other parts of the world. Spa Mineral Water is distributed in the UK by Aqua Amore Ltd. Spa mineral water comes from the grounds of the Hautes Fagnes, of which the upper layers exists from heath land and peat.

Spa mineral water is available in bottles of three litres, two litres, one and a half liter, one liter, 75 cl, 50 cl, 30 cl and 25 cl. It is also available in 33 cl cans. There are several types of Spa mineral water.

== Variants ==
The several types of Spa mineral water are instantly recognizable by their color of the label. These labels are blue, red or green.

- Spa Reine (Spa blue). It contains no carbonation and has a very low amount of minerals.
- Spa Barisart (Spa red). It contains few minerals and some carbonation.
- Spa Marie-Henriette. It contains natural carbonation.
- Spa Citron (Spa green). It contains some carbonation and added lemon flavour.

The water comes from different sources which are characterised by their difference in minerals.

== Spa in national culture ==
=== The Netherlands ===
In the Dutch language in the Netherlands, the brand Spa has historically been so pervasive that it has become a generic term for mineral water. Spa rood (transl. Spa red) is a generic term for sparkling water, as the label for sparkling Spa is red. Likewise, Spa blauw (transl. Spa blue) is a generic term for still (non-carbonated) mineral water, as the label for non-carbonated Spa is blue.

In a Dutch restaurant, for example, if a customer wishes sparkling mineral water, they will most commonly ask for "Spa Rood". Generally, the waiter would not expect that the customer wants Spa brand specifically, nor would the customer expect Spa specifically.

== See also ==
- Mineral water
