= Staatl. Fachingen =

Bottled water brand

- Country: Germany
- Source: Lahn valley
- Type: sparkling
- Bromine (Br): 0.17
- Calcium (Ca): 92.5
- Chloride (Cl): 131
- Bicarbonate (HCO_{3}): 1812
- Fluoride (F): 0.31
- Lithium (Li): 0.67
- Manganese (Mn): 0.34
- Magnesium (Mg): 56.6
- Nitrate (NO_{3}): 0.3
- Potassium (K): 15.33
- Sodium (Na): 560
- Strontium (Sr): 0.35
- Sulfate (SO_{4}): 39
- TDS: 2864
- Website: fachingen.de
- All concentrations in milligrams per liter (mg/L); pH without units

Staatl. Fachingen (full name: Staatlich Fachingen) is a German medicinal and mineral water discovered in 1740, first sold in jars in 1746, and later bottled starting in 1870. Due to its relatively high content of hydrogen carbonate, it can neutralize excessive acid in the stomach. The spring is located in Lahn valley north of Wiesbaden, close to the eastern boundary of Nassau natural preserve.

The company is headquartered in Fachingen/Lahn and has been part of Mineralbrunnen Überkingen-Teinach AG since 1990. Staatlich indicates that the spring was state-owned until this 1990 sale (previous owner: Rhineland-Palatinate). In 2001, Karlsberg acquired controlling interest in the Mineralbrunnen Überkingen-Teinach company from Nestlé, including Afri-Cola and the mineral water brands Staatlich Fachingen and Hirschquelle.

Since 2008, Staatl. Fachingen has also been selling flavored water products. The market share of the company in Germany was about 28% in 2004.

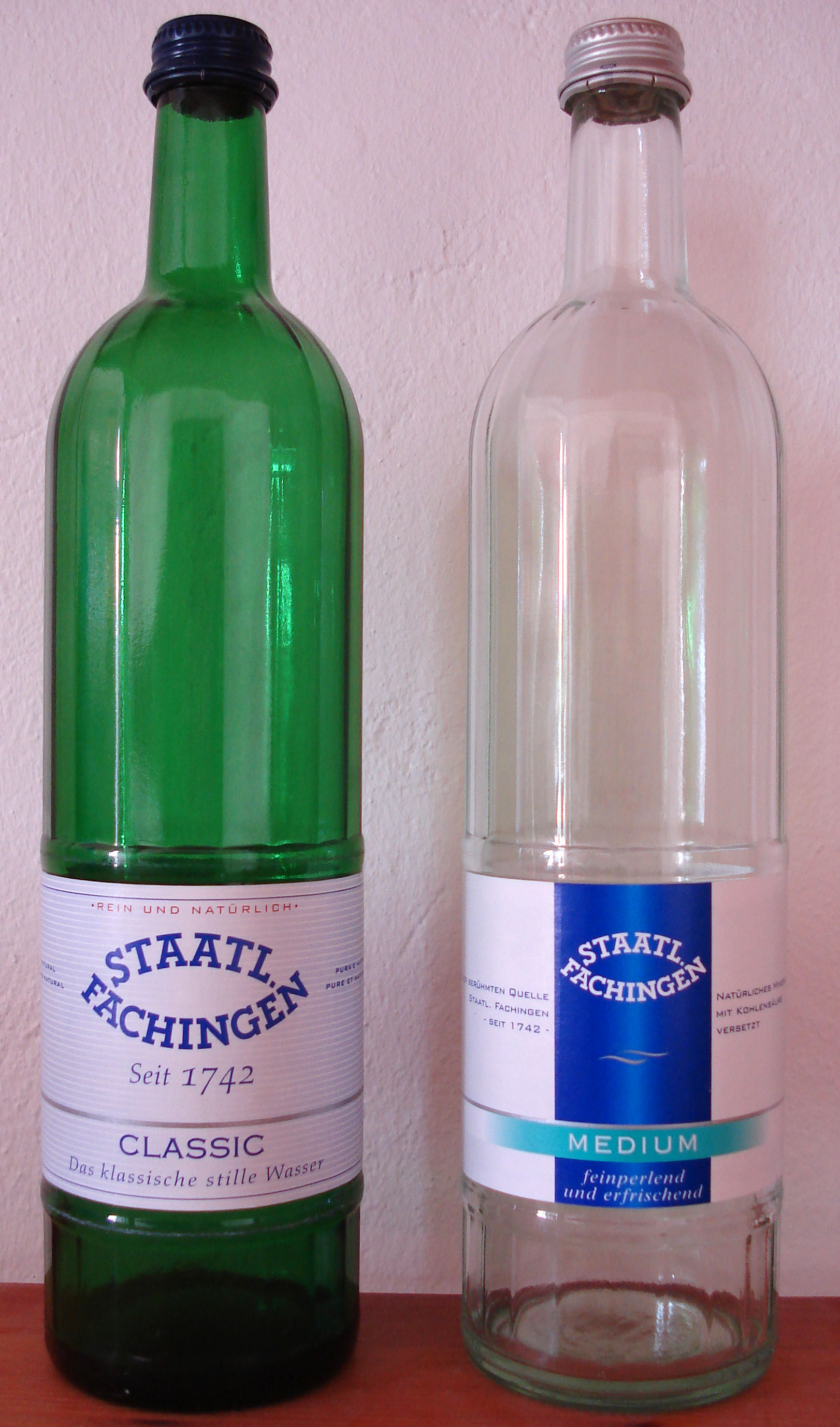
Two glass bottles of Staatl. Fachingen

== History ==
Fachinger Mineral Water was the drink of choice for Adolf Hitler during his tenure as Chancellor. Due to Hitler's fear of being poisoned by his enemies or opponents, and subsequent refusal to drink any other water, it was necessary for a constant supply to be made available for him during his travels.
