= Smucker =

Smucker is a surname. Notable people with the surname include:

- Barbara Smucker (1915–2003), American children's author
- Jerome Monroe Smucker (1858–1948), American businessman, founder of The J.M. Smucker Company
- Lloyd Smucker (born 1964), American politician, member of the U.S. House of Representatives from Pennsylvania
- Mark Smucker (born 1969), CEO of The J.M. Smucker Company
