= Peanut butter and jelly sandwich =

Peanut butter and jelly
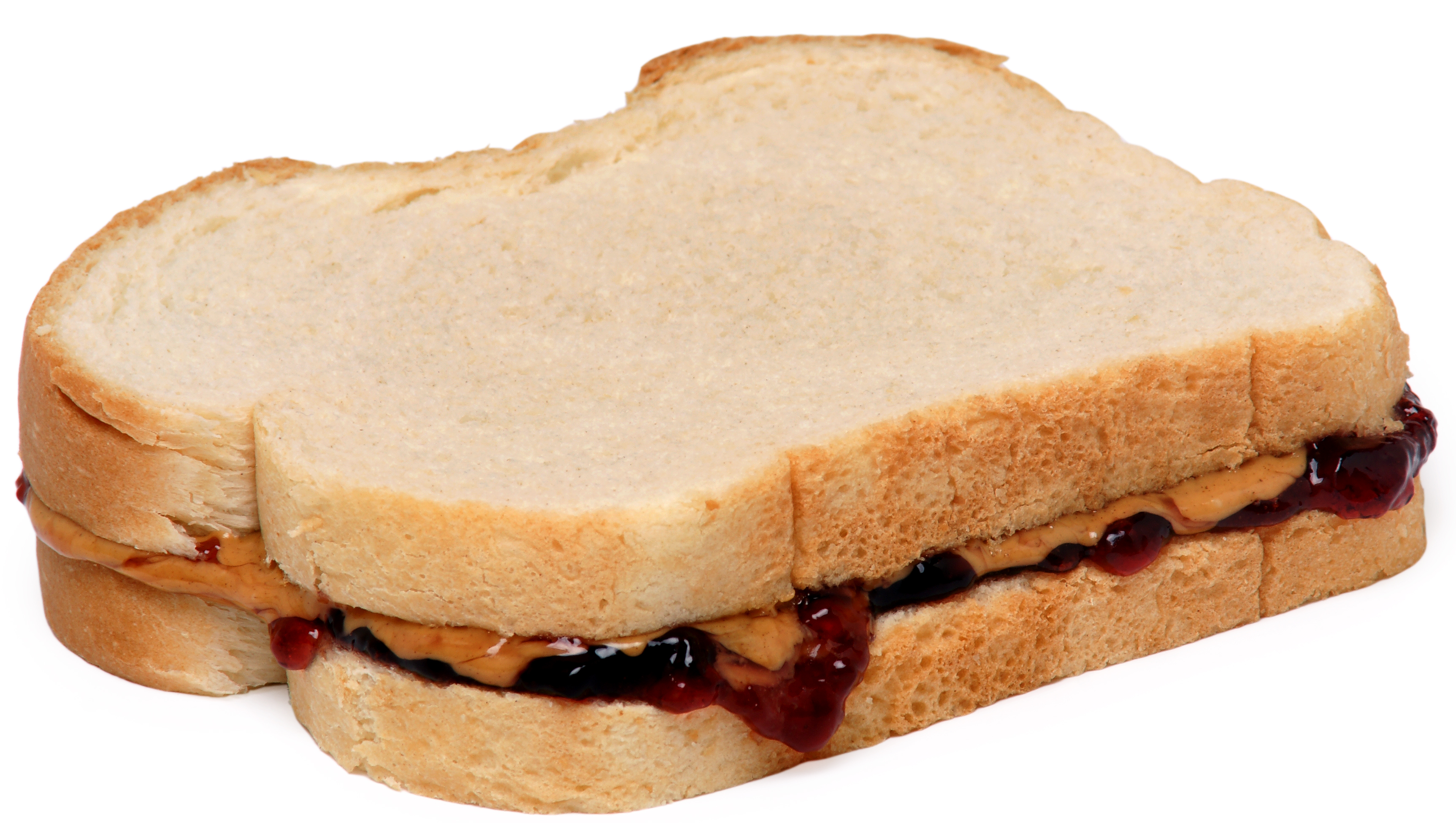
- A peanut butter and concord grape jelly sandwich on white bread
- Alternative names: PB&J, PBJ
- Type: Sandwich
- Place of origin: United States
- Main ingredients: Peanut butter, jelly or jam, sliced bread
- Variations: Fluffernutter; Fool's Gold Loaf; Uncrustables

A peanut butter and jelly sandwich (PB&J or PBJ) is a sandwich that consists of peanut butter and fruit preserves spread on sandwich bread. It is known for its popularity among children in the United States and is considered a comfort food. The earliest recorded mention of a peanut butter and jelly sandwich appeared in 1901, suggesting it as a tea sandwich. It was popularized in the United States after mass-production made peanut butter accessible. Its nutritional value and long shelf-life made it a common meal for the poor during the Great Depression, and it was eaten by American soldiers during World War II. The sandwich was ingrained in popular culture by the 1950s and 1960s. Concern about peanut allergies has eroded its prominence as a school meal in the 21st century.

== Preparation and nutrition ==
Peanut butter and jelly sandwiches (PB&J) consist of a layer of peanut butter and a layer of jelly or jam spread across sandwich bread. They are typically associated with grape jelly and white bread. Peanut butter and jelly sandwiches contain significant starch, protein, fat, and sugar content. While the fat and sugar content were considered beneficial when the sandwich was created, they came to be seen as undesirable toward the end of the 20th century. Critics of processed food point to the white bread, hydrogenated peanut butter, and corn syrup jelly that are commonly used to make the sandwich.

Peanut butter can be substituted with other nut butters or Nutella, while jelly can be substituted with other preserves or fruit curd. The ingredients can be placed on other breads, including bagels. Variants include a cream cheese and jelly sandwich, called a CJ, or a peanut and marshmallow creme sandwich, called a fluffernutter. The Fool's Gold Loaf is a peanut butter, jelly, and bacon sandwich made with a hollowed-out loaf of bread at the Colorado Gold Mine Company in Denver; it became popularly associated with Elvis Presley after he spent $16,000 flying his associates to Denver to buy 22 of them. Amanda Hesser introduced "pbjs", sandwiches with tart berry jam and mousse made with foie gras on white bread, in a 2003 cookbook.

== History ==
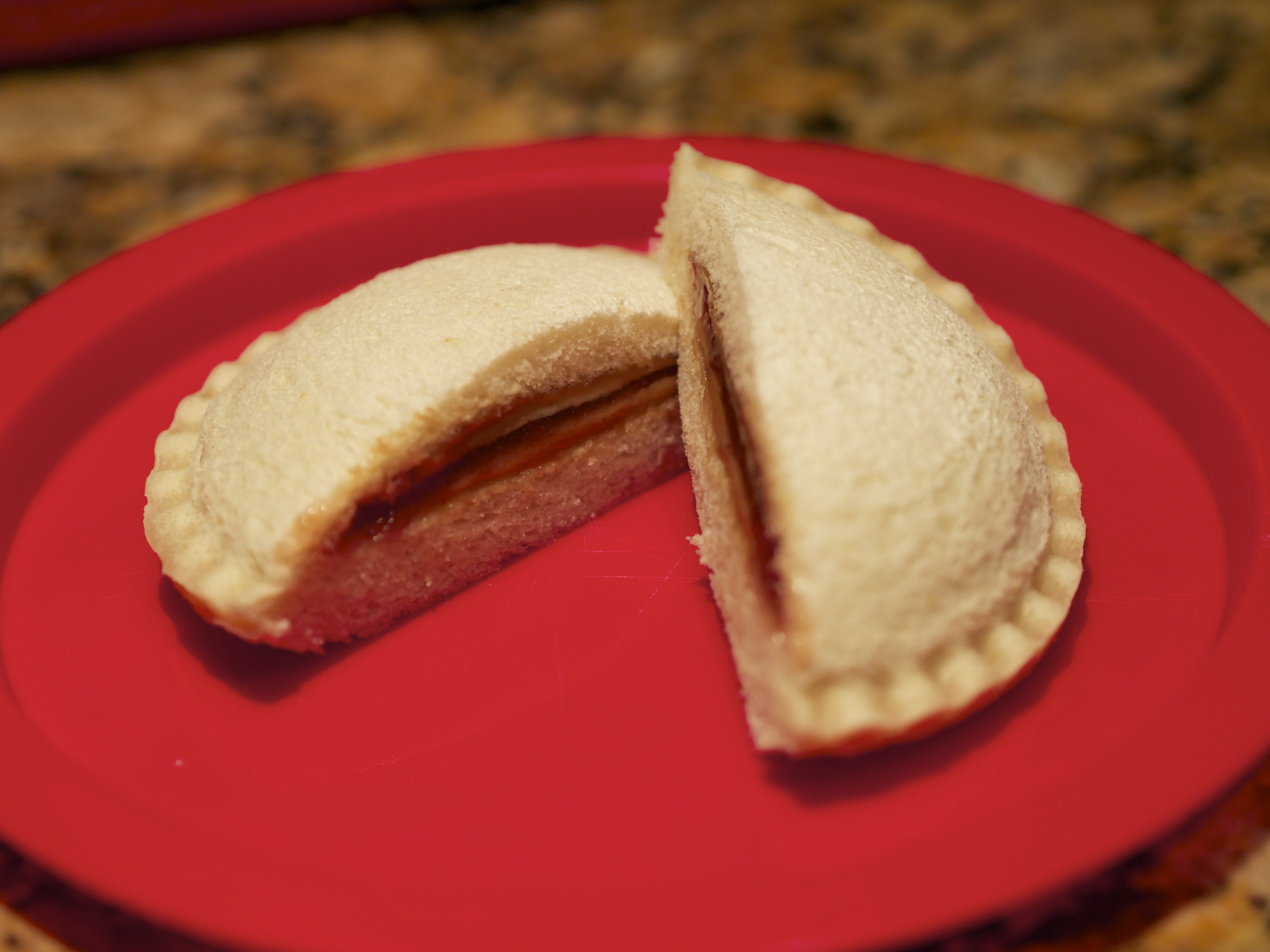
An Uncrustables sandwich

As with many sandwiches, the origin of the peanut butter and jelly sandwich is disputed, though it is understood to be an American-invented dish. They were first prepared in the 1900s decade as a teahouse dish for wealthy Americans. The first published mention of the peanut butter and jelly sandwich appeared in an article by Julia Davis Chandler in a 1901 issue of the Boston Cooking School Magazine. The article recommended making tea sandwiches with peanut butter, referred to as "peanut paste", and currant or crab-apple jelly. She says in the article that she believes the recipe to be original. This came five years after the first published mention of using peanut butter as a spread on slices of bread. Throughout the decade, peanut butter was considered a delicacy. By 1913, an article in The New York Times endorsed using peanut and jelly spreads in sandwiches for children's lunches in school.

Peanut butter and jelly sandwiches became more popular by the 1930s as all three of their ingredients became more accessible through industrialization and preservation. Developments in 1928 in particular were influential, consisting of both the invention of sliced bread and developments in peanut butter manufacture. Peanut butter and jelly sandwiches were common food choices given to families in need during the Great Depression in the United States because of their nutritional value and inexpensive ingredients. They were often recommended as a meal when rationing, but they were often paired with other ingredients besides jelly. American soldiers sometimes ate peanut butter and jelly sandwiches because of the long shelf lives of their ingredients. This led to a common image of the sandwich having been popularized by veterans when they returned home.

Peanut butter and jelly sandwiches became a major dish in American cuisine beginning in the 1950s and 1960s. They held cultural value both in the mainstream and with new social movements, including the civil rights movement and the counterculture of the 1960s, where they were sometimes eaten at protests or music festivals. This included vegetarians, who ate peanut butter as a source of protein. Peanut butter and jelly sandwiches returned to their association with the working class by the late-1960s, and they were commonly recommended as a cheap food during the 1970s recession.

Smuckers introduced Goober Grape in 1968, a combination jar of peanut butter and jelly spread. It patented the sealed crustless sandwich in the United States on December 21, 1999, and it began selling the Uncrustables line of frozen sealed crustless sandwiches the following year. The patent distinguished Smuckers' product from other sandwiches with its crimped edge sealed through contact rather than hydrolyzed starch, and with the method of encapsulating the second layer of filling between the first and the third. Enforcement of the patent over the following years caused public debate over whether variations of foods like a peanut butter and jelly sandwich can be patented. The success of Uncrustables allowed Smuckers to purchase the Jif brand of peanut butter from Procter & Gamble, making it the owner of the largest peanut butter brand as well as the largest jelly brand. It had previously tried purchasing Jif in the 1970s.

The prominence of peanut butter and jelly sandwiches in schools declined as awareness of peanut allergies increased at the start of the 21st century. In many cases, they have been affected by bans of peanut butter products in schools.

The world record for largest peanut butter and jelly sandwich was set on November 13, 2010, when a 1,342-pound (609 kg) sandwich was made at the Great American Peanut Butter Festival in Saline, Texas.

== Cultural status ==
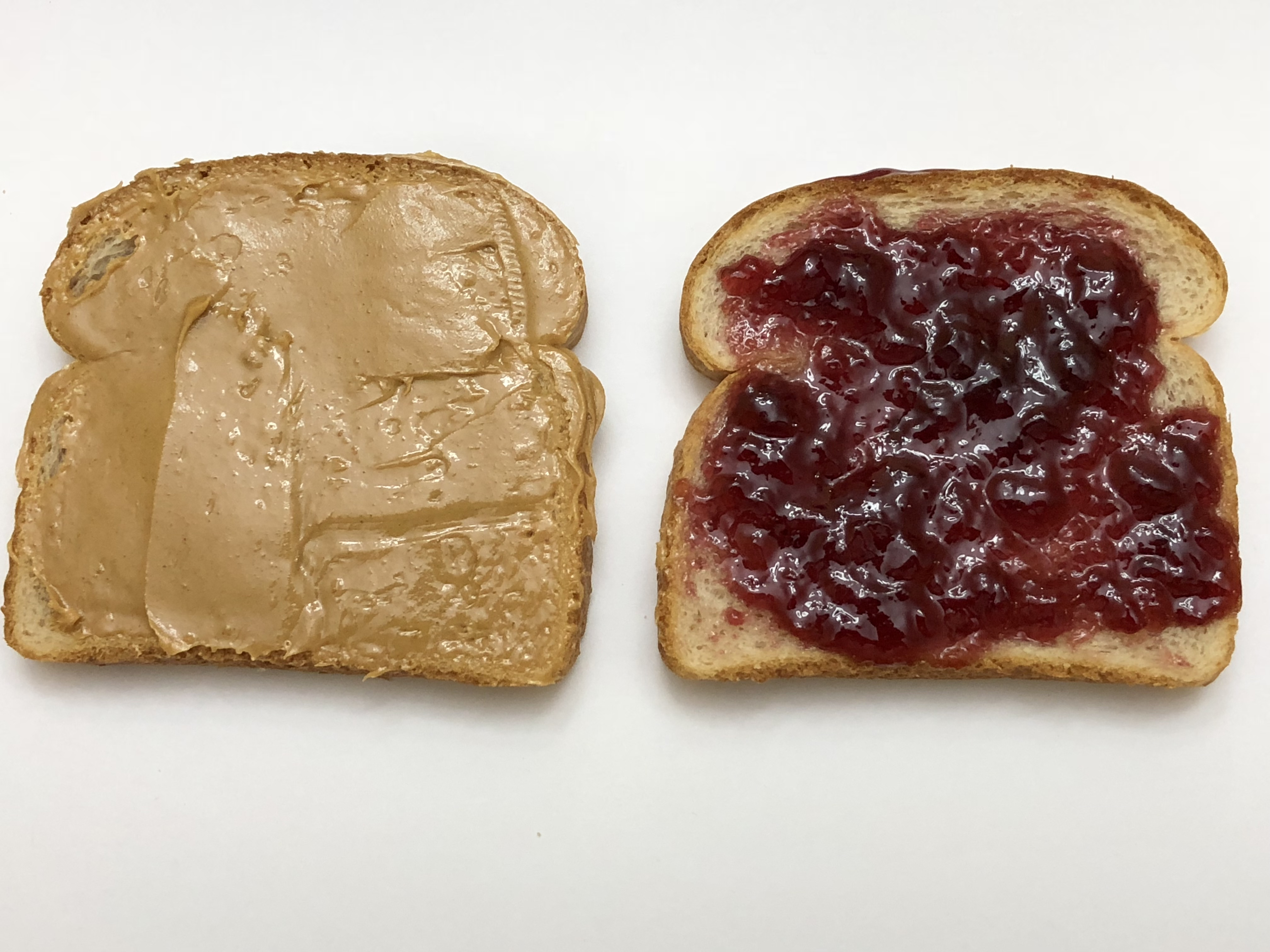
A peanut butter and jelly sandwich being made

The peanut butter and jelly sandwich held a prominent cultural status in the United States during the second half of the 20th century, especially among children. Peanut butter and jelly sandwiches are a comfort food widely recognized in American culture. They do not need to be refrigerated, which has made them a popular dish for outside of the house. They are commonly associated with schools, work spaces, campsites, and picnics, and they were historically part of the imagery of Independence Day celebrations.

Peanut butter and jelly sandwiches are commonly seen as a child-friendly food in the United States, relative to other sandwiches that may have ingredients like vegetables. They typically carry associations of nostalgia or parental love. The sandwiches are alternatively seen as a symbol of bare-minimum caretaking or the tedious aspects of domesticity. The association of peanut butter and jelly with children can have the effect of demeaning other groups that consume them, such as the poor. This was evoked intentionally by critics of the counterculture movement in the 1960s, as they portrayed protesters as children who ate peanut butter and jelly. They have also been depicted as a working class food because they provided a nutritional meal with inexpensive ingredients, though they have historically maintained popularity across social classes. Peanut butter and jelly sandwiches are seen in a poor light by proponents of gourmet cuisine, who have historically used the sandwich as an example of low-quality food.

Peanut butter and jelly sandwiches began featuring prominently in American culture by the 1950s, including repeated references to them by The Andy Griffith Show in the 1960s. Children's songs about making peanut butter and jelly were written, and "It's Peanut Butter Jelly Time" by Buckwheat Boyz became a popular internet meme in the early 2000s. The sandwiches also became part of the 2004 United States presidential election when both major candidates, George W. Bush and John Kerry, both spoke about their love of the dish to cultivate a relatable image. Bush had used a similar tactic in the 2000 election, and he allegedly ate peanut butter and jelly sandwiches in the White House daily while he was president. When the reality television show Big Brother began in the United States, contestants living in the Big Brother House were restricted to a diet of peanut butter and jelly sandwiches as a punishment when they lost competitions, reflecting its status as kitsch cuisine associated with the working class. National Peanut Butter and Jelly Day occurs annually in the United States on April 2 as an unofficial food day.

== See also ==
- Jam sandwich
- List of sandwiches
- List of peanut dishes
- Peanut butter sandwich
- Peanut butter, banana and bacon sandwich
