= Mark Smucker =

American businessman

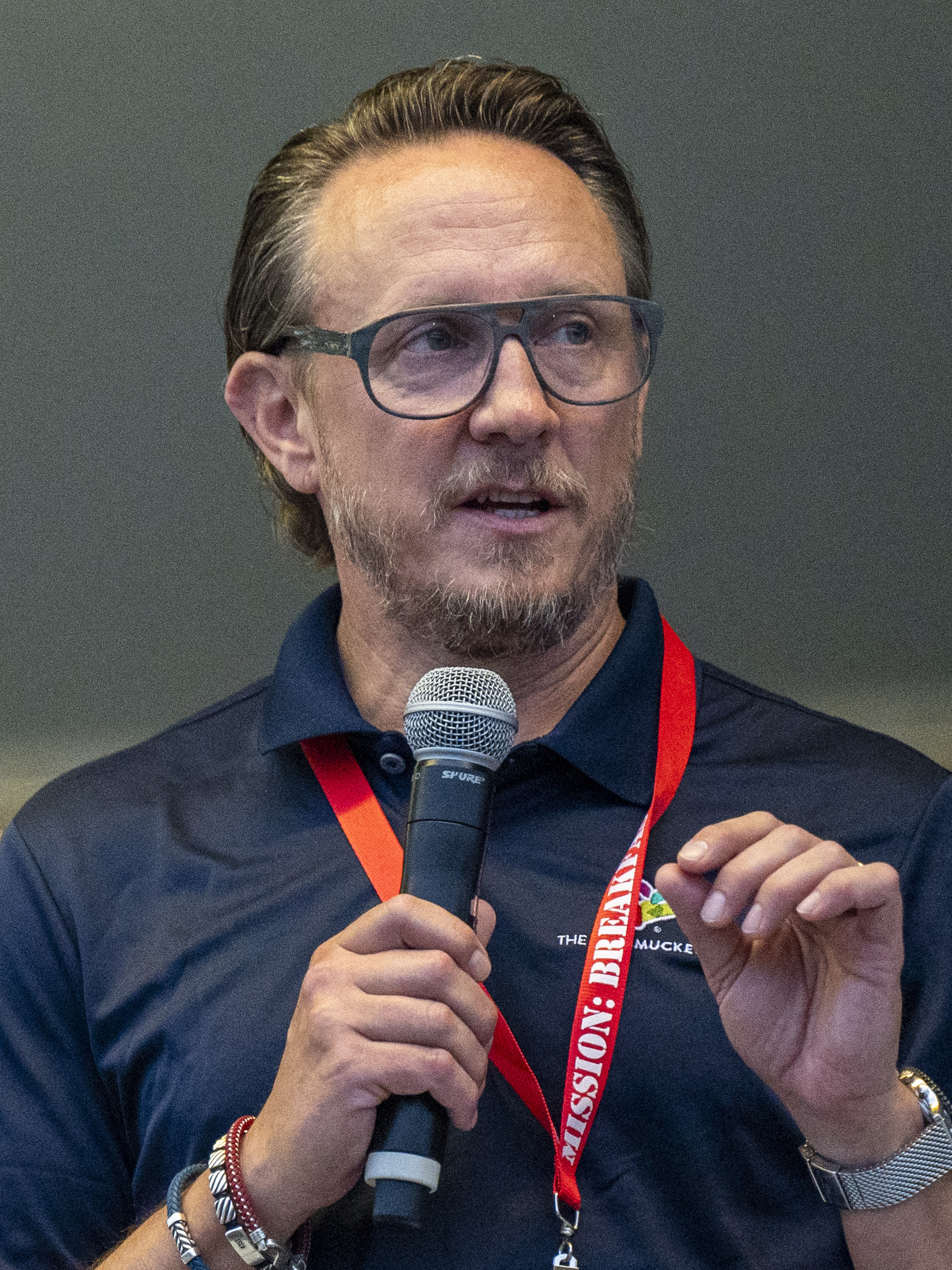
- Smucker in 2024
- Born: December 30, 1969 (age 56); Ohio, U.S.
- Education: College of William & Mary; Thunderbird School of Global Management
- Occupations: Company President and CEO
- Known for: The J.M. Smucker Company
- Family: Jerome Monroe Smucker 2x great-grandfather

Mark Timothy Smucker (born December 30, 1969) is an American businessman who has been the president and CEO of The J.M. Smucker Company since May 2016. He is the fifth-generation member of the Smucker family to lead the business, a now publicly traded Fortune 500 company encompassing coffee, packaged food, and pet food, headquartered in Orrville, Ohio.

Prior to his appointment as CEO, he had held executive positions since 2001 in the company's Canadian, international, special markets, coffee, consumer foods, and natural foods divisions, and had been a member of its board of directors since 2009. He had been in managerial positions at the company from 1997 to 2001.

== Early life and education ==
Smucker was born in 1969, the son of Timothy P. Smucker and the great-great-grandson of Jerome Monroe Smucker, who had founded The J.M. Smucker Company (Smucker's) in 1897. He grew up in Orrville, Ohio, where the company is headquartered.

Like most members of his extended family, he worked summers at the company when he was in middle school, high school, and college, doing a variety of jobs including janitorial work, quality control, marketing and sales, and procurement, and working in various departments at the corporate offices. Family members who wanted an executive career at the company were also expected to try something else first for at least two years, and to get a master's degree.

Smucker attended Orrville High School, graduating in 1988. He began composing electronic music in high school, and played in the school's band; his senior year he received the Louis Armstrong Jazz Band Award.

He attended the College of William & Mary, receiving a BS in geology with a minor in English in 1992. In 1996 he received a Master of International Management degree from the Thunderbird School of Global Management in Phoenix, Arizona.

== Career ==
=== Early career ===
After receiving his undergraduate degree in 1992, Smucker enrolled in the Thunderbird School of Global Management in Arizona, and had an internship in Mexico City one summer which also took him to Venezuela, Argentina, and Chile. After receiving his master's degree in international management in 1996, he moved to Buenos Aires, Argentina to work for the advertising company Leo Burnett Worldwide, working on Procter & Gamble accounts.

=== The J.M. Smucker Company ===
==== Manager and director ====
In September 1997, still living in Argentina, he joined the family company and became manager of business development in South America. In May 1998, he was promoted to director of business development in South America. In January 2000, he moved to São Paulo, Brazil, to manage a fruit ingredient business that Smucker's had acquired, becoming general manager and managing director of Smucker do Brasil and general manager of Mercosur.

==== Executive roles ====
In November 2001, he was elected a vice president of Smucker's and appointed general manager of its international market, and he returned to the U.S. in 2002. Because the company had acquired the Jif peanut butter and Crisco shortening oil brands from Procter & Gamble in June 2002, and was strengthening its focus on its much larger-scale businesses in North America, his primary responsibility during this time period was divesting many of the company's international assets.

In June 2004, after the company's $840 million acquisition of International Multifoods, which included Pillsbury dry baking mixes and frosting, he was appointed vice president and managing director, Canada. In May 2006 he became vice president, international and managing director, Canada, and in July 2007 he became vice president, international.

In a reorganization following J.M. Smucker's acquisition of Folger's, in August 2008 Smucker was promoted to president of its special markets group, which included the company's foodservice, natural food and beverages, and Canadian and international operations. In January 2009, he was also elected to the company's board of directors.

In May 2011, as the company restructured once more while ending its dual-CEO model, Smucker was appointed president of its retail coffee division. In this role he oversaw coffee brands including Folger's, Millstone Coffee, Café Bustelo, and Dunkin’ Donuts.

In April 2015, as the company reorganized its leadership upon entering the pet food market with the acquisition of Big Heart Pet Brands, and after his cousin Paul Smucker Wagstaff resigned from the company, Smucker was elected president of both the consumer foods and natural foods divisions.

==== CEO ====
In March 2016, the company announced, in a planned leadership transition, that Mark Smucker would become president and CEO effective May 1, succeeding his uncle Richard K. Smucker, who had been CEO since 2011 and co-CEO with Mark's father Timothy P. Smucker from 2001 to 2011. As Mark Smucker became CEO, Richard Smucker became executive chairman, succeeding Timothy Smucker, who remained on the board as a director and chairman emeritus.

As CEO, Smucker has sought to position the company for growth and continued profitability by achieving the right product mix for current-day consumers. Under his leadership, in 2018 the company acquired Ainsworth Pet Nutrition, the parent company of Rachael Ray's Nutrish line of dog and cat food, and sold off its dry baking-mixes business as consumers moved away from cake-mix brands towards buying fresh baked goods and healthier foods. These two major changes to the company's product lines allowed it to focus on the three categories of pet food, coffee, and snacking – large sectors with projections for continued growth.

He has also made a priority of bringing in smaller, trendy, emerging "craft" brands to the company, in addition to its well-known traditional brands, in order to appeal to consumers', especially younger consumers', changing tastes. In 2018 the company launched a premium coffee line called 1850, which has a smooth but bolder taste and a heritage backstory about the California Gold Rush, to appeal to millennials.

In his first four years as CEO, Smucker modernized the company's marketing and communications. He focused the company on interacting more closely with consumers by: establishing one-on-one connections between consumers and brands via extensive use of social media and other avenues, making advertising more contemporary, and increasing, reorganizing, and deepening brand marketing. His modernization of the company also included making it more agile and able to respond more quickly to market conditions and changing consumer trends. This involved utilizing the insights gained via advanced data analytics, and increasing e-commerce. In November 2019, the company announced a number of executive leadership changes designed to streamline decision-making and enable greater agility.

In 2019, Smucker updated the company's purpose statement to meet changing consumer and societal dynamics, by gathering a diverse cross-section of 40 of its 7,000 employees from all ranks and departments, together with a consulting firm, for brainstorming. This resulted in a new purpose statement, "Feeding connections that help us thrive – life tastes better together", which he has stated refers to making connections between people and communities, business and communities, and business and the planet.

Smucker has also emphasized and increased the company's corporate social responsibility, sustainability, and environmental protection efforts. In 2014, two years before he became CEO, the company had detailed three specific six-year environmental goals it aimed to achieve by 2020. Under Smucker's leadership the company achieved the first two goals a year early, by July 2019; the two benchmarks were diverting 95% of waste which would have gone to landfills; and reducing water use by 15%. In 2018 the company invested in a windfarm in central U.S. to help achieve its third six-year goal of offsetting its greenhouse-gas emissions by 10% and its electricity usage by 50%. By 2019, the company had also supported thousands of individual coffee farmers in sustainable practices, and sponsored efforts, via cross-breeding, to develop new varieties of arabica coffee that can withstand global warming.

He has also preserved and increased the company's longstanding commitment to its employees. Under his leadership, paid parental leave and paid vacation time have expanded, and pet bereavement leave has been added.

== Board memberships ==
In addition to being on the board of directors of The J. M. Smucker Company, Smucker is on the boards of directors of the Kimberly-Clark Corporation, the Consumer Brands Association, and the Greater Cleveland Partnership.

He is on the advisory board of the LeBron James Family Foundation, and is on the Thunderbird Global Alumni Network Advisory Council at the Thunderbird School of Global Management.

== Personal life ==
Smucker lives in Akron, Ohio. He met his wife Katie during his work stint in Argentina in the late 1990s; at the time she was an American expat working in Mexico City and was on a business trip to Argentina. The couple married in 2000, and have two children.

He is fluent in Spanish and Portuguese. His hobbies include deejaying house music.
