= Albert A. Clapp =

- Born: May 1, 1841; Pompey, New York
- Died: May 8, 1911 (aged 70)
- Burial place: San Gabriel Cemetery
- Military career
- Allegiance: United States of America
- Branch: United States Army
- Rank: First Sergeant
- Unit: 2nd Regiment, Ohio Volunteer Cavalry - Company G
- Awards: Medal of Honor

First Sergeant Albert Adams Clapp (May 1, 1841, to May 8, 1911) was an American soldier who fought in the American Civil War. Clapp received the country's highest award for bravery during combat, the Medal of Honor, for his action during the Battle of Sayler's Creek in Virginia on 6 April 1865. He was honored with the award on 24 April 1865.

== Biography ==
Clapp was born in Pompey, New York, on 1 May 1841. He enlisted into the 2nd Ohio Cavalry. He died on 8 May 1911 and his remains are interred at the San Gabriel Cemetery in San Gabriel, California.

== Medal of Honor citation ==
Capture of battle flag of the 8th Florida Infantry (Confederate States of America).

== See also ==
- List of American Civil War Medal of Honor recipients: A–F
