= Bick's =

Pickle producing company

- Product type: Pickle
- Current owner: TreeHouse Foods
- Introduced: 1951; 75 years ago
- Previous owners: Robin Hood Flour; The J.M. Smucker Company
- Website: bicks.ca

Bick's is a Canadian brand of pickles. Originally a producer based in Scarborough, Ontario, it currently exists as a brand whose products are imported and sold in Canada by U.S.-based TreeHouse Foods.

Bick's emerged in 1951 in the Toronto area when local farmers George and Lena Bick and their sons Walter and Thomas began to pickle the cucumbers produced on their Knollview farm. Beginning as a small operation of 60,000 jars, the Bicks produced 12 million jars in 1960. The business was sold in 1966 to Robin Hood Flour and later became part of International Multifoods.

Walter Bick, one of the founders of Bick's Pickle, died on October 17, 2011, at the age of 94. Walter left behind four children, thirteen grandchildren and seven great-grandchildren.

For 50 years, the plant was a large commercial operation in the Scarborough City Centre area. However, the pickling and brining operations moved to Delhi, Ontario, in 1998 and remaining production to Dunnville, Ontario, in 2001.

In 2004, The J.M. Smucker Company acquired Bick's after it merged with International Multifoods. In 2010, Smuckers announced the closure of both Ontario facilities and thus brought an end to Bick's production in Canada. Since 2011, Bick's products are imported from the United States and marketed by the company's Markham, Ontario, based head office.

TreeHouse Foods acquired the brand from Smucker in 2024. The former plant at 333 Progress Avenue is now used by paperboard and recycling firm Atlantic Packaging.
