= Uncrustables =

American sandwich brand

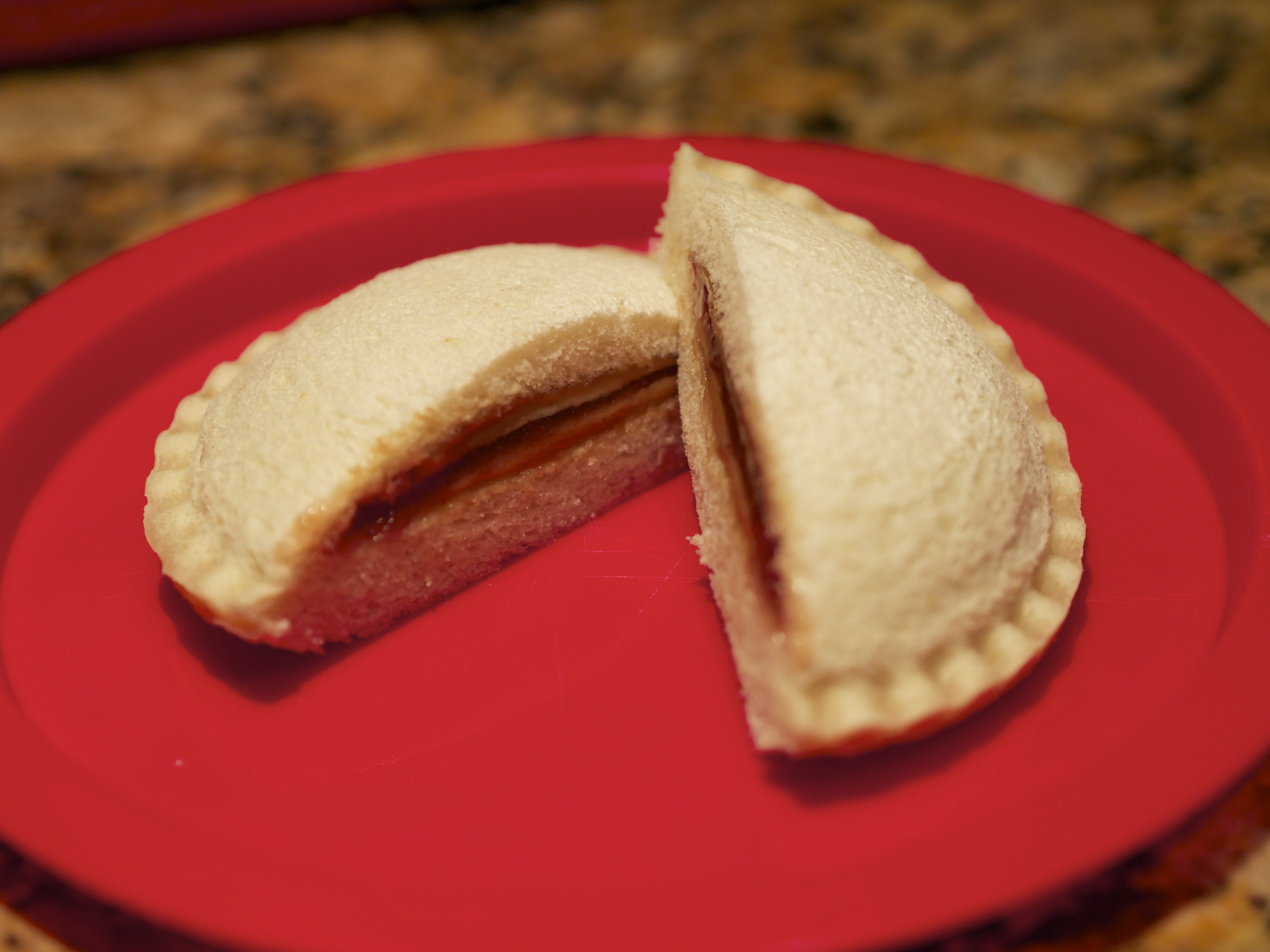
- Type: Sealed crustless sandwich
- Inception: 1995; 31 years ago
- Manufacturer: The J. M. Smucker Company
- Available: United States, Canada
- Current supplier: Smucker's
- Website: www.smuckersuncrustables.com

Uncrustables is an American brand of sealed crustless sandwich. Owned and manufactured by The J. M. Smucker Company since 1998, the brand originally included only frozen peanut butter and jelly sandwiches, crimped along the edges and available in either grape jelly or strawberry jam varieties. Distributed in the United States and Canada, the Uncrustables line generated approximately $800 million in sales during fiscal year 2024.

The product line has expanded to include several other sweet variations, including peanut butter paired with mixed berry, honey, raspberry, or apple cinnamon jelly. The brand also offers chocolate-flavored hazelnut spreads, either alone or combined with peanut butter. While most of these varieties are sold exclusively in multi-sandwich boxes, the original flavors are also available in a slightly larger size, sold individually in convenience stores.

Uncrustables also includes some savory varieties such as turkey and colby jack bites or uncured ham and cheddar bites. These retain the Uncrustables branding, but do not use the crimped sandwich design.

Reduced-sugar versions of some peanut butter varieties are also available, which are made with whole wheat bread.

== History ==
=== Early history ===
The Uncrustables sandwich was developed in 1995 in Fergus Falls, Minnesota by Len Kretchman and David Geske. Before creating the product, Geske ran a packaged ice business, while Kretchman was a former wide receiver for North Dakota State University, and had worked with schools in the food service industry. Geske and Kretchman were having lunch with their families, when Kristen Geske and Emily Kretchman commented to their husbands that they should "create a mass-produced peanut butter and jelly sandwich without the crust." After doing taste tests at schools, Kretchman and Geske began selling the sandwiches as the Incredible Uncrustables. A trademark was secured for the name, and after a year and a half, a patent was also secured for the sandwich. By the end of 1998, fifty employees working out of Fargo, North Dakota were making 35,000 sandwiches a day. The product was sold to schools in eight Midwestern states.

=== Purchase by Smucker's ===
Smucker's bought the brand in 1998 for $1 million, simplifying the name to Uncrustables. The original flavors included peanut butter with grape jelly, and peanut butter with strawberry jam. The Uncrustables brand had $10 million in annual sales in 2000, and $27.5 million in annual sales in 2004.

In October 2012, several shipments of Uncrustables sandwiches were recalled for containing peanut butter by Sunland Inc., a Smucker's supplier. Sunland had recently closed a plant after other companies using its products reported salmonella outbreaks. Smucker's tests its own products, and no illnesses were attributed to Uncrustables. In 2017, the Uncrustables recipe was reformulated to use sugar instead of high fructose corn syrup, and NSF International certified the reformulated recipe as non-GMO. Citing difficulties meeting demand, Smucker's did little marketing for the Uncrustables brand in its early years. Its first national marketing campaign was in 2019, and coincided with the opening of a dedicated plant in Longmont, Colorado. Built for $340 million, the new Uncrustables facility doubled production capacity.

=== Expansion ===
Smucker's expanded distribution of Uncrustables sandwiches into Canada in 2022, and began building an R&D center at the Smucker's headquarters in Ohio. Sales for the Uncrustables brand in 2022 came to $511 million. Smucker's continued to have difficulty keeping up with demand, and was working on expanding its Uncrustables plant in Denver. Kansas City Chiefs football player Travis Kelce "fueled a sales boom" in November 2023, after he mentioned in a podcast that he likely ate more Uncrustables sandwiches than "anything else in the world." Sales for Uncrustables that year were $685 million. The Athletic reported in October 2024 that the NFL consumed over 80,000 Uncrustables sandwiches in a year. The Denver Broncos ate the most, consuming 700 sandwiches a week.

In November 2024, Smucker's opened an Uncrustables manufacturing facility in McCalla, Alabama. Around $1.1 billion was invested in the plant.

== Product ==
Uncrustables are "pre-made peanut butter and jelly, pocket-like, circular sandwiches" made by The J. M. Smucker Company, according to the Associated Press. The sandwiches are sold frozen and are meant to be defrosted and eaten at room temperature. In 2023, Smucker's launched a variety that lasts for five days in the fridge after thawing, allowing them to appear in convenience-store refrigerators.

According to the Wall Street Journal, they are popular with children but also with adults at work or away from home. Flavors include raspberry, grape, strawberry, and honey, all combined with peanut butter. A variety with only chocolate-flavored hazelnut is also sold. Larger versions of Uncrustables sandwiches are sold in certain markets and contain around 590 calories instead of around 200. The original flavors, grape and strawberry jam, are sold in reduced sugar versions on whole wheat bread.

== Patents ==
Patent number 6,004,596 was issued to Smucker's on December 21, 1999, for a "sealed crustless sandwich". Since then, the Uncrustables brand has been involved in several high-profile patent and trademark disputes.

Smucker's began an effort in 2001 to expand its patent to also include manufacturing methods. After the U.S. Patent and Trademark Office denied the request, Smucker's appealed several times. Its bid was rejected in 2005, with patent number 6,004,596 deemed not "novel or non-obvious enough."

Smucker's sent a cease and desist letter to Chubby Snacks for trademark infringement in 2020; Chubby Snacks changed the shape of its crimped sandwiches to clouds as a result. In 2022, Smucker's sent a cease and desist letter to Gallant Tiger's PB&J over its advertising of a round peanut butter and jelly sandwich with a bite out of it. The claim was later dropped. Uncrustables in 2025 sued Trader Joe's for alleged trademark infringement.

== See also ==
- List of sandwiches
