= Lois Wyse =

American advertising executive

- Born: Lois Wohlgemuth; October 30, 1926; Cleveland, Ohio, U.S.
- Died: July 6, 2007 (aged 80); New York City, New York, U.S.
- Occupations: Advertising executive; author; columnist
- Spouse(s): Marc Wyse (19??-1980; divorced); 2 children Lee Guber (1982-1988; his death)
- Children: Katherine Wyse Goldman; Robert Wyse

Lois Wyse (October 30, 1926 – July 6, 2007) was an American advertising executive, author and columnist. At the time of her death, Wyse was credited with writing more than 60 books on diverse topics such as business, love and family.

== Early life and career ==
Born Lois Wohlgemuth to a Jewish family in Cleveland, Ohio, she started working as a journalist at the age of 17 for The Cleveland News and The Cleveland Press. At 18, she worked on a piece for Life magazine with photographer Alfred Eisenstaedt. She later worked for Vogue and Cosmopolitan.

== Advertising career ==
At a Cleveland-based advertising agency she co-founded, Wyse Advertising; she came up with a tagline for a small Orrville, Ohio company called The J.M. Smucker Co. that made them famous throughout the United States - "With a name like Smucker's, it has to be good". She also advised Carl Stokes on his successful campaign to be elected as Mayor of Cleveland in 1967. She suggested the small retail chain called Bed and Bath would fare better as Bed, Bath & Beyond.

Lois Wyse opened her advertising company in New York City in 1966. She worked for a wide range of clients on campaigns including American Express and Revlon.

She was inducted into the Advertising Hall of Fame in 2018.

== Publications ==
Wyse had her first book, The I Don't Want to Go to Bed Book for Boys, published by Macmillan in 1963. She wrote prolifically over the next few years, including books of poetry best described as "commercial poetry or greeting card gift booklets". One of these volumes Love Poems for the Very Married published in 1967 sold over 200,000 copies.

She also wrote several novels, The Rosemary Touch (1974) and Kiss Inc. (1977). Good Housekeeping published a weekly column on her life and family called "The Way We Are". She wrote about love, family and career issues in Funny, You Don't Look Like a Grandmother (1989).

== Personal life ==
Lois and her first husband Marc Wyse divorced in 1980; the couple had two children, Robert Wyse and Mrs. Katherine Goldman. In 1982, she remarried to theatrical producer Lee Guber, who died in 1988.

She died of cancer in 2007, aged 80. She was survived by her daughter, Katherine, and son-in-law Henry Goldman; son Robert and daughter-in-law Denise Wyse; stepson Zev Guber and wife Heidi; and eight grandchildren. Her funeral was held at Congregation Emanu-El of New York.
