= TreeHouse Foods =

American food company

TreeHouse Foods Inc.
- Type: Private
- Traded as: NYSE: THS
- Industry: Grocery product manufacturer
- Founded: 2005; 21 years ago
- Headquarters: Oak Brook, Illinois, USA
- Products: Private label grocery products
- Revenue: $3.45 billion USD (2023)
- Owner: Industrial F&B Investments III
- Number of employees: 7,500 (2023)
- Parent: Investindustrial
- Website: treehousefoods.com

TreeHouse Foods Inc. is a multinational food processing company founded in 2005 that specializes in the production of private label packaged foods. Headquartered in Oak Brook, Illinois, and consisting entirely of acquisitions, it had $2 billion in sales and over 4,000 employees in 20 facilities in 2010.

As the 37th largest American food and beverage firm in 2015, it was named 2010 Processor of the Year by Food Processing magazine, which called it "the biggest company you never heard of". After being No. 446 on the Fortune 500 list in 2018, TreeHouse dropped to No. 552 on the Fortune 1000 list in 2020.

In November 2025, it agreed to be purchased by Industrial F&B Investments III in an all-cash deal valued at nearly $1.2 billion. Part of the European investment group Investindustrial, Industrial F&B Investments III completed the transaction in February 2026.

== History ==
In 2005, when TreeHouse began trading on the New York Stock Exchange, Bay Valley Foods, LLC became its division after Dean Specialty Foods was spun off from Dean Foods. Michelle Obama was a member of the board of directors from 2005 through 2007.

On October 22 2024, Treehouse foods recalled over 100 varieties of frozen pre-made waffle and pancake products.

=== Acquisitions and divestitures ===
- 2006: Acquired the soup business of Del Monte Foods.
- 2007: Acquired the salsa and picante business of San Antonio Farms, acquired jam, jelly, syrup and pie-filling (both brand name and private-label) producer E. D. Smith, founded by the Canadian politician E. D. Smith
- 2010: Acquired Sturm Foods and S.T. Specialty Foods
- 2013: Acquired Naturally Fresh, Inc., Cains Foods, and Associated Brands
- 2014: Made a bid to acquire Michael Foods Group Inc

- In April 2014, TreeHouse acquired private-label soup and gravy maker Protenergy Natural Foods from Whitecastle Investments.
- In June 2014, TreeHouse announced that it was buying Minnesota-based Flagstone Foods for $860 million as a way to gain access to the growing healthy snacks category. The company said the acquisition would push its annual turnover towards $3.5 billion.

- 2016: Acquired Ralcorp, the ConAgra Foods private-brand business division, for $2.7B.
- 2018: Sold McCann's Steel Cut Irish Oatmeal, acquired with Sturm Foods in 2010, to B&G Foods for $32 million.
- 2020: Acquired majority of Ebro's Riviana Foods U.S. branded pasta business for $242.5 million in cash. The acquisition included the following regional pasta brands: Skinner, No Yolks, American Beauty, Creamette, San Giorgio, Prince Spaghetti and Light 'n Fluffy, Mrs. Weiss', New Mill, P&R Procino-Rossi and Wacky Mac, as well as the St. Louis manufacturing facility, which employs approximately 90 people.
- 2022: The pasta business and E. D. Smith, along with Knox gelatin, were sold in October to Investindustrial for $950 million and renamed Winland Foods.
- 2024: Acquired the Bick's brand from J. M. Smucker.

== Subsidiaries ==
=== Bay Valley Foods, LLC ===
Bay Valley Foods, LLC
- Type: Subsidiary
- Industry: Grocery manufacturing
- Predecessor: Dean Pickle and Specialty Products; Green Bay Food Co.; Arnold Brothers; Alart & McGuire
- Founded: June 27, 2005; 21 years ago
- Headquarters: Green Bay, Wisconsin, United States
- Parent: TreeHouse Foods, Inc.
- Website: bayvalleyfoods.com

Bay Valley Foods traces its earliest predecessor back to the 1862 establishment of a company that would become Alart & McGuire, a pioneering New York pickle manufacturer. Alart & McGuire was operating in Virginia by 1893, and had expanded as far west as Wisconsin by 1907. The company built a large pickle factory in Green Bay, Wisconsin in 1917. In 1925, Alart & McGuire was sold to Arnold Brothers Pickle and Preserve Co., incorporated in Chicago in 1922. Arnold Brothers became Green Bay Food Company around 1929.

Its modern history begins with a portfolio of products assembled by Dean Foods, a large dairy producer founded in Illinois in 1925. Dean Milk Company purchased Green Bay Food Company in 1962, one of its first acquisitions outside of the dairy industry. Dean Milk Company changed its name to Dean Food Company a year later, and continued to grow though a series of acquisitions over the following decades. Green Bay Food Company was renamed Dean Pickle and Specialty Products Company in 1994. On January 27, 2005, Dean Foods announced that it was exiting the specialty foods segment. The assets of Dean's Specialty Foods Group were transferred to the newly-created Bay Valley Foods, with administrative offices in Green Bay, Wisconsin, on June 27, 2005.

=== Sturm Foods, Inc. ===
Sturm Foods, Inc.
- Formerly: A. Sturm & Sons
- Type: Subsidiary
- Industry: Dry grocery manufacturing
- Founded: 1905; 121 years ago
- Founder: Arthur Sturm
- Headquarters: Manawa, Wisconsin, United States
- Products: Powdered drink mix; Hot cereal; K-Cup pods; Seasoning & coating mix
- Revenue: $340 million (2009)
- Number of employees: 750 (2009)
- Parent: Bay Valley Foods, LLC
- Website: sturmfoods.com

Sturm Foods began in 1905 as a dairy farm in Manawa, Wisconsin operated by Arthur Sturm and his sons Carl, Clarence, Paul, and Arthur, Jr. It began to grow when they started buying eggs from local farmers and shipping them to relatives in Chicago to sell in the city. During the 1930s they expanded into other bulk commodities, including sugar, seed, twine, potatoes, flour, coal, and gasoline. They produced large quantities of powdered eggs and powdered milk for the military during World War II, which led to the installation of their first packaging lines for consumer-sized products. The company began producing private label products for retailers in the early 1970s. It saw further expansion during the 1980s and '90s, growing from 150 to 500 employees. In July 2000, the company changed its name from A. Sturm & Sons to Sturm Foods. Private equity firm Hicks, Muse, Tate & Furst, which later became HM Capital Partners, bought the company in May 2005.

On December 21, 2009, TreeHouse Foods announced that it had reached an agreement to purchase Sturm Foods from HM Capital Partners for $660 million. To finance the purchase, TreeHouse sold $400 million of new bonds carrying an eight year term and an interest rate of 7.75%, and issued 2.7 million shares of stock at $43.00 per share. The remainder was funded from its revolving credit facility. The company cited Sturm's strength in private label hot cereal and powdered drink mixes as key benefits of the deal, and expected the purchase to add $0.38 to $0.40 per share to its annual earnings, a 16% increase. Sturm had $340 million in sales for the year ending September 30, 2009, and 750 employees. The sale was completed March 2, 2010.

== Business model ==
The company's primary business strategy is to acquire producers of private-label products in Canada and the U.S. It services both the retail grocery and the foodservice distribution channels. In addition to private-brand non-dairy creamers, single-serving coffee pods, baby foods, salad dressings, marinades, dips, soups, sauces, dry-mix pasta dinners, jams, spreads, and cereals, the company also maintains several brand-name products including Cremora non-dairy coffee lightener, Second Nature egg substitutes, and Nature's Goodness baby foods.
