= Goober =

Goober may refer to:

== Food ==
- Peanut (US English slang)
- Goober (brand), a food product combining peanut butter and fruit preserves
- Goobers, a Nestlé brand name of chocolate-coated peanut

== Fictional characters ==
- Goober Pyle, on the television shows The Andy Griffith Show, Mayberry R.F.D. and Hee-Haw
- Goober, a dog in the 1970s animated series Goober and the Ghost Chasers
- Goober, a gremlin in the BBC children's comedy sketch show Stupid!
- Goober, the player character in the Mac computer game GooBall
- Goober, a member of the Satan's Mothers MC in The Warriors
- Roland Goubert, "The Goober", a main character in the young adult novel The Chocolate War by Robert Cormier

== Other uses ==
- E. Eugene Cox (1880–1952), US representative from Georgia, nicknamed Goober
- Goober (TV series), a 2016 Australian TV comedy series
- WGGC, an American FM radio station branded as "Goober 95.1"
