= Laura Scudder =

American businesswoman (1881–1959)

- Born: Laura Emma Clough; July 19, 1881; Philadelphia, Pennsylvania, U.S.
- Died: March 13, 1959 (aged 77); Los Angeles, California, U.S.
- Resting place: San Gabriel Cemetery, San Gabriel, California, U.S.
- Occupations: Lawyer, entrepreneur
- Known for: Laura Scudder potato chips
- Spouse: Charles Scudder (m. 1908; died 1928)

Laura Clough Scudder (July 19, 1881 – March 13, 1959) was a medical nurse, the first female attorney in Ukiah, California, a restaurateur and an entrepreneur and inventor who made and sold potato chips in Monterey Park, California.

Starting by frying hand-sliced potato chips in her home, Scudder pioneered the packaging of potato chips in sealed bags to extend their freshness. Called the "Potato Chip Queen of the West", she grew her business into a multi-million dollar enterprise that covered the west coast of America. By the mid-1950s the company's annual gross sales exceeded $20 million (equivalent to $268 million in 2025).

== Early life and education ==
Scudder was born July 19, 1881 in Philadelphia, the first of George and Margaret Lucinda (née Graham) Clough's two daughters. Her mother died when she was two years old.

After graduating from high school, Scudder clerked at the Wanamaker's department store in Philadelphia. Planning to become a doctor, she attended Temple University but couldn't afford medical school tuition. Instead she studied at the Mercer Hospital School of Nursing in Trenton, New Jersey, earning a diploma in three years during a 15-hour per day class schedule.

== Start of her entrepreneurial career ==
While working as a nurse at Mercer Hospital in Trenton, New Jersey, she met a patient named Charles Scudder whom she wed on July 4, 1908. The couple moved to Seattle. Her husband Charles was a produce salesman but was also granted US patents from 1901 through 1917 for his inventions including a blind stitch sewing machine and a "Box, Lock and Handle" mechanism. Scudder developed a respiratory ailment and moved the family first to San Francisco for her health and then to Ukiah, California.

The couple purchased the Little Davenport, a cafe in Ukiah located across from the Mendocino County Courthouse. Among the restaurant's patrons were lawyers who encouraged her to study law. Scudder did using borrowed law books and in March 1918 passed the California bar in Sacramento at the Fourth District Court while four months pregnant. She was the first female attorney in Ukiah but never practiced law.

A block-wide fire consumed the Scudder's restaurant so they moved from Ukiah to Monterey Park and bought both a full-service gasoline station and a home.

== Potato chips ==
From the early 1900s, potato chips were distributed in bulk to stores. Customers were sold smaller portions in paper bags filled from barrels or glass display cases. Chips were also sold in large tins. By the time the chips arrived home, chips at the bottom of the bags or tins were stale and crumbled. This meant potato chip manufacturing was necessarily regional, as chips did not travel well and were not mass produced.

=== The start of Laura Scudder's potato chips ===
In 1926, Scudder produced her first batch of kettle fried potato chips in the kitchen of her home. She began with 200 pounds of potatoes--washed, peeled, and sliced by hand.

Scudder explained the reason she started frying her own potato chips. "It all started because Elise (her daughter) used to bring home the old-fashioned bulk potato chips and they’d be limp and quite often rancid and we didn’t want her to eat them. So we started out to make potato chips that would be safe for her, and tasty too".

Scudder decided to manufacture potato chips in the empty brick building which was attached to their Monterey Park gas station.

=== Scudder's packaging innovation drives demand ===
Scudder refused to sell her chips in bulk, preferring to sell them in small wax paper packages which kept them fresh. She had her employees fold and seal the wax paper sheets on three sides with irons. After the factory filled the wax paper pouches with her chips and sealed them they were airtight bags. The individually bagged chips were extremely popular. Scudder's "Mayflower Chips" sold well in Los Angeles County. She quickly introduced "Blue Bird Chips", selling them in Northern California's Bay Area.

Scudder also began putting dates on the bags, becoming the first company to show a freshness date on its food products. She also sold her chips in twin packs to increase sales volume. This new standard of freshness was reflected in the marketing slogan, "Laura Scudder's Potato Chips, the Noisiest Chips in the World".

In 1953 Scudder had earned 50% of potato chip sales on the US west coast. The sales growth required opening a second potato chip factory in Fresno, California. Her potato chip production now required 1,000 employees. She also opened a potato chip plant in Oakland.

=== Expanded food production ===
At the time, potato chips sold best during the summer and sales fell off during the winter. Scudder expanded into producing and marketing peanut butter and mayonnaise in order to keep her workforce employed year round. In order to better control the quality of her mayonnaise, she purchased a chicken farm, making sure the egg quality met her standards.

=== Innovative business practices led to greater success ===
Scudder created then novel business innovations helping her company prosper. These included: her accounting the cash price paid for necessary business equipment instead of using depreciation (for example, she didn't depreciate the cost of the company's 300 delivery truck fleet); she insisted all invoices would be paid on the day of receipt which enhanced vendor confidence; and encouraged dealing fairly with both suppliers and customers.

=== Branding and advertising innovation ===
Scudder held weekly meetings with her sales managers and sales force. Some of Scudder's effective business innovations were the branding and advertising of her products which persuaded consumers both to their purchase and suggested use. She wrote and supervised her company's advertising campaigns. She stressed the need for simple and direct advertising. Scudder was the first to use the noise of crunching a crisp potato chip as a marketing slogan, claiming "The noiseiest chip in the world". She was one of the first to use outdoor billboard advertising to market regional food products.

A 1949 outdoor billboard for "Laura Scudder's Peanut Butter" showed a jar of the product at the right of a large red arrow with the single word "PURE". Her peanut butter containers only high-grade Virginia peanuts that had the bitter skin removed and salt. A contemporary magazine ad for the peanut butter told mothers their children "would thrive on a pound (of Laura Scudder's Peanut Butter) per week" if they were fed the product.

Scudder often personally promoted her products at hospitals, in schools and at area women’s club meetings. She often shared recipes twice per week on local radio stations that used her company's potato chips. One of the recipes she shared was a chocolate cake recipe that used Scudder's mayonnaise instead of eggs and butter. Ingredients like butter and fresh eggs were scarce during World War II due to civilian rationing to supply the needs of the military.

=== Overcame misogyny in business ===
Scudder often had to overcome prejudice against women in business - an example: Initially the Scudder family used the family automobile to deliver their bags of potato chips to stores. They soon bought a delivery truck to meet the growing demand.

When she contacted local male insurance agents for quotes to insure her first company delivery truck, she was told by every agent she couldn't purchase insurance because "women could not be relied on to pay their premiums on time". Scudder found a female insurance agent who agreed to insure the first truck and later the entire company fleet of over 300 trucks.

== Laura Scudder Inc. ==
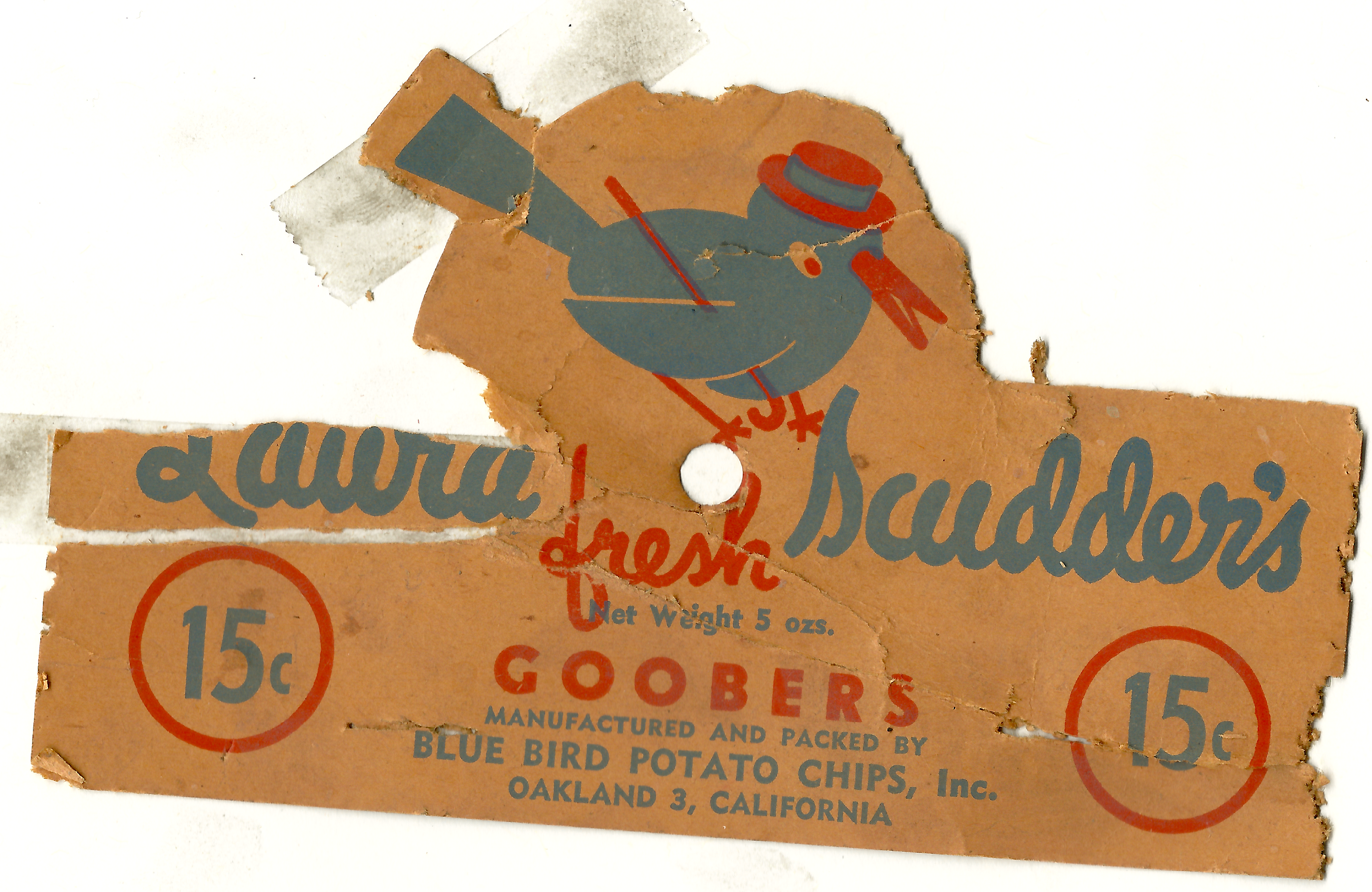
Laura Scudder label

At one point, Scudder turned down a $9 million offer for the company because the buyer would not guarantee her employees' jobs. In 1957, she sold her firm to Signal Oil & Gas with a $6 million offer (equivalent to $68,779,621 in 2025) from a buyer who guaranteed job security for her workforce. The new company was called Laura Scudder Inc. She continued to run the company until her death in 1959.

=== Post-Laura ===
In 1962, Signal sold Laura Scudders to PET Milk Company. In 1983, it was spun out to an investor group, becoming again independent. In 1987, Laura Scudder Inc. was sold to Borden, Inc. for $100 million. Annual sales for the chipmaker were $126 million in 1986. To avoid union issues, Borden closed all California plants of Laura Scudder Inc. only a year later. Borden's overall culture of mismanagement, incurrence of excessive debt to finance numerous acquisitions, and several restructurings in 1993, led Borden to sell what remained of Laura Scudder for less than $16.7 million. The buyer, G.F. Industries, Inc.'s Granny Goose subsidiary, was already in trouble, and was put up for sale in January 1995. In 2009, Snack Alliance, Inc. licensed from The Laura Scudder's Company, LLC the rights to produce and market potato chips under the Laura Scudder's brand.

According to The J.M. Smucker Company website, the Laura Scudder's Natural Peanut Butter business was acquired by Smucker's from BAMA Foods Inc. in December 1994. In 2009, Smucker's marketed the Laura Scudder's brand of natural peanut butter on the west coast. According to a March 31, 2010, announcement, Snack Alliance, Inc. was acquired by Shearers Foods Inc., a manufacturer of competing salty snacks in different regions of North America. At the same time (2010), it appeared the original Laura Scudder's brand was being actively marketed by a Californian company. These two companies have different packaging for their different Laura Scudder's products, and the Californian company appears to be marketing its products nationwide.

== Legacy ==
John Scudder, Laura Scudder's grandson, created a television documentary called Laura to honor his grandmother. It was completed in 1989 but only broadcast in 2007, because one of her daughters did not want anything made about her. After she died, the documentary was shown on the southern California public television station KOCE.

Laura Scudder's Papers and the Women's Studies Scholarship is at Chapman University. Laura Scudder Program Series is at the Bruggemeyer Library, in Monterey Park. with donations from the Laura Scudder Foundation.
