= Peanut butter sandwich =

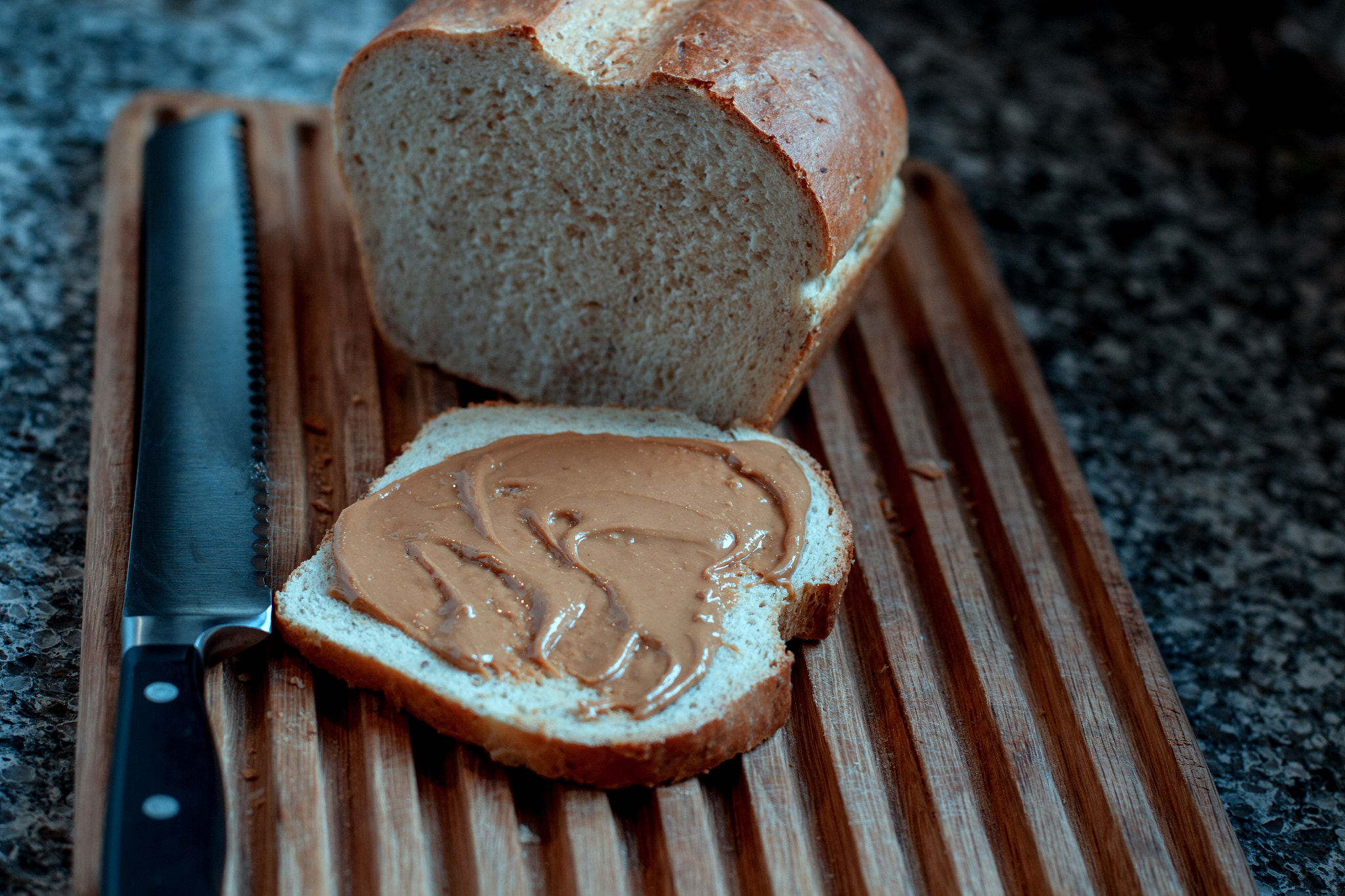
Peanut butter on sliced bread

A peanut butter sandwich is a sandwich prepared by spreading peanut butter between sliced bread. The sandwich emerged at the end of the 19th century, and was initially perceived as a luxury and eaten with a range of flavors including cream cheese, Worcestershire sauce, and watercress. As industrial peanut butter production was developed and the Great Depression set in, peanut butter sandwiches became widely eaten as a cheap, convenient food.

== History ==
The food historian Andrew F. Smith dates the first peanut butter sandwiches to 1896, at a time when sandwiches were first gaining prominence in American diets. The first record Smith identifies is in the May edition of the magazine Good Housekeeping. In the article, the writer Anna Churchill Carey recommends that women keeping house pulverise peanuts in their meat grinders, and apply the result to bread. Throughout the rest of the year, more recipes for peanut butter sandwiches appeared in magazines and books, including one authored by Mary Virginia Terhune under a pseudonym, in cities including Seattle and Boston. Early peanut butter sandwiches were flavored by a range of ingredients, including cayenne and paprika, cream cheese, and Worcestershire sauce.

By the end of the century, recipes had been published across America, including in a cookbook written for German-Americans. One recipe for the sandwich appeared in 1898 in Atlanta, Georgia, concluding with instructions to "Tie with brown ribbon having the same tint as the paste." Another early recipe was printed in The Times Cook Book, No. 2 in 1905. It instructed cooks:

Boil peanuts until tender; remove hulls in cold water; mash. Season with butter and salt. When cold spread between slices of bread. Good for school lunch.

Peanut butter sandwiches were considered a health-food for the upper class of early-20th-century United States, and they were combined with a range of ingredients, including watercress, cheese, meats, and in 1901, fruit preserves. The peanut in these sandwiches served both as an adhesive and a flavor not perceived to be overpowering. The advent of mass-produced peanut butter in the 1920s and the Great Depression that followed made them more common across the country. Around this time, peanut butter sandwiches became associated with children, especially after the invention of sliced bread in the 1920s, permitting children to quickly make sandwiches without the risks of wielding sharp knives. Peanut butter sandwich has been available as a variety of Girl Scout Cookies since the 1960s. In modern peanut butter sandwiches, many fillings are added along with peanut butter, including bacon, lettuce, mayo, and pickles.

== In schools ==
From the 1930s, peanut butter products became common in American schools, after industry encouraged government to purchase crop surpluses.

In 2010, reporting described peanut butter sandwiches being given to children in some American schools when they did not have money on hand to pay for school lunches, intended to incentivize bringing money. In cases where children enjoyed the peanut butter sandwiches such that the incentive was no longer effective, some schools swapped out the sandwiches for other meals. In 2014, schools were described as commonly banning the sandwich based on concerns they would trigger children's allergies.

== See also ==
- List of peanut dishes
- List of sandwiches
- Peanut butter and jelly sandwich
- Peanut butter, banana and bacon sandwich
