= Jerome Monroe Smucker =

American farmer and entrepreneur (1858–1948)

- Born: December 5, 1858; Wayne County, Ohio, United States
- Died: March 20, 1948 (aged 89); Wayne County, Ohio, United States
- Occupations: Farmer, entrepreneur
- Known for: Founding The J.M. Smucker Company

Jerome Monroe Smucker (December 5, 1858 – March 20, 1948) was an American farmer and entrepreneur who founded The J.M. Smucker Company food and beverage firm in 1897, starting out selling apple butter from the back of a horse-drawn wagon. He was of Swiss descent.

== Biography ==
Smucker, born in Wayne County, Ohio, was the son of Ohio Mennonite farmers Gideon and Magadalena (Zook) Smucker. Jerome Smucker’s descended from immigrants who left Switzerland named Schmucker in the 1750s. He built the family business to four farms and a creamery, while spending his evenings tutoring his neighbors in good penmanship. When he added a cider mill in 1897, Smucker's first batch of apples came from some of Johnny Appleseed's original orchards. To extend sales of apple products year-round, Smucker began manufacturing apple butter from an old family recipe, and it soon became his most popular product. Smucker's began listing the ingredients of its many jams and jellies years before it was required by law, and the business was incorporated in 1921. The company's namesake died in 1948, but the business is still family-owned, and still headquartered in Jerome Smucker's hometown of Orrville, Ohio.

On March 23, 1890, Smucker married Ella M. Yoder, of Bristol, Ind., who predeceased him on March 6, 1933. Early in life he accepted Christ as his Savior and united with the Oak Grove Mennonite Church near Smithville, Ohio, later becoming a charter member of the Orrville Mennonite Church.

He was an active Christian worker, serving the Sunday school as teacher and superintendent for many years. He was also greatly interested in the educational and missionary activities of the church, supporting the work through his prayers and liberal giving. He was a lifelong resident of the Orrville community, where he attained prominence by founding the manufacturing company which bears his name. He died in 1948 at age 89. Funeral services were held at the Oak Grove Church on March 23, in charge of V. M. Gerig and I. W. Royer. Interment was made in the Crown Hill Cemetery at Orrville.

The distinctive surname was originally Schmucker, when Smucker's great-great-grandfather came to America from Switzerland in the 1700s. It was later spelled Smoker for about two generations, before the family's forebears grew uncomfortable with a name that suggested tobacco use and took to spelling the name Smucker.

Smucker's great-great-grandson, Mark Smucker, has been CEO of The J.M. Smucker Company since 2016. Jerome's son Willard led to a significant expansion of the company in the 1950s and 1960s.
