= Prince spaghetti =

Pasta brand and manufacturer in the USA

Prince (also known previously as Prince Spaghetti) is a pasta brand and manufacturer in the United States. The company has been sold several times in the latter part of its history and is currently a part of Winland Foods.

Prince was founded in 1912 when 3 Sicilian immigrants opened a small pasta shop in the North End of Boston, Massachusetts at 92 Prince Street. Gaetano LaMarca was the administrator, Giuseppe Seminara was the salesman and Michele Cantella was the pasta maker. It soon outgrew its shop and relocated to Lowell, Massachusetts. In 1941, Giuseppe Pellegrino, another Sicilian immigrant, joined the company and soon bought a controlling interest. The company remained in the hands of the Pellegrino family until 1987 when it was sold to Borden, which was acquired by New World Pasta in 2001.

In 2017, Riviana Foods, a subsidiary of Ebro Foods, merged with New World Pasta to gain a controlling interest in the brand (as well as a controlling interest in American Rice), and in 2020, the brand was sold to TreeHouse Foods, which in turn sold the brand to Investindustrial Winland Foods in 2022.

Prince is best known for its 1970s commercials featuring an Italian-American mother leaning out of a window in the North End of Boston yelling for her son Anthony to come to dinner. The tag line was "Wednesday is Prince Spaghetti day."
