= Millstone Coffee =

American coffee brand

Millstone Coffee bags

Millstone Coffee was a brand of coffee sold in the US, a division of The J.M. Smucker Company. The company sold whole bean and ground coffee in retail settings and on its website.

== History ==
The company was founded in Everett, Washington, in 1981. Founder Phil Johnson sold 100-pound sacks of Arabica beans to high-end coffee shops in the greater Seattle area and pioneered the idea of selling whole-beaned coffees to supermarkets.

Johnson sold the company to Procter & Gamble in 1996, which closed most of the Everett operation and ran the company from Ohio. Johnson took the assets P&G did not purchase and created the Cascade Coffee company, which continues to do business in Everett.

== Expansion ==
In January 2008, Procter & Gamble announced plans to create an independent company named the Folgers Coffee Company. The company consisted of three segments: Retail, Commercial, and Millstone.

== Merger ==
On November 6, 2008, The J. M. Smucker Company announced the completion of its merger with the Folgers Coffee Company. On September 9, 2016, J.M. Smucker Co. announced its decision to discontinue the Millstone brand, citing 'lack of sustainable demand'.
