= San Gabriel Cemetery =

Cemetery in Los Angeles County, California

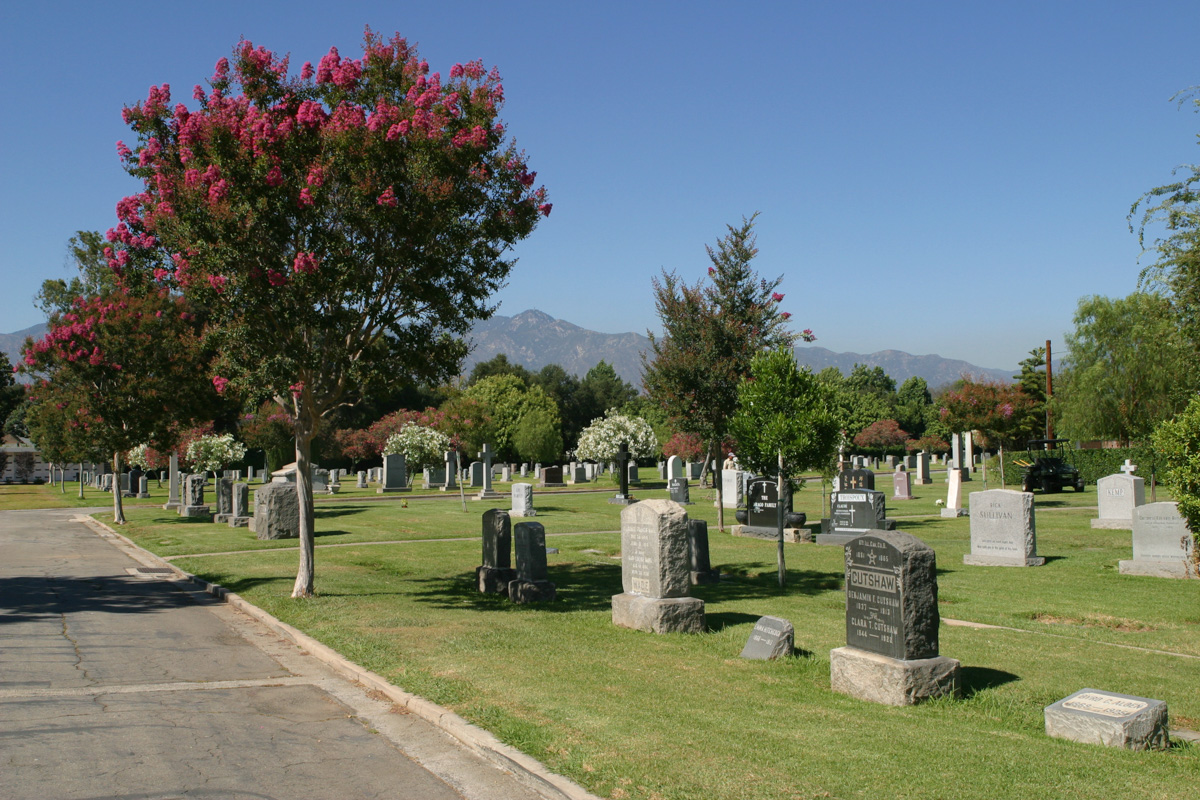
- San Gabriel Cemetery

Details
- Established: 1872 (153 years ago)
- Location: 601 W Roses Rd; San Gabriel, California
- Country: United States
- Coordinates: 34.11130°N 118.10863°W
- Size: 15 acres (6.1 ha)
- No. of graves: 19,471
- Website: https://sangabrielcemetery.com
- Find a Grave: San Gabriel Cemetery

San Gabriel Cemetery is a historic cemetery in San Gabriel, California, United States. Founded in 1872, it contains over 19,000 burials in its approximately 15 acres (6 ha), including many of the founding leaders of San Gabriel and Los Angeles.

== History ==
The San Gabriel Cemetery Association was formed and the cemetery was founded in 1872. The cemetery property was separated from that of its neighbor, The Church of Our Savior in 1874 and the Association filed Articles of Incorporation with the County Clerk on April 16, 1874. Benjamin Davis Wilson provided the cemetery with additional land in 1875. The first burial was recorded in 1876.

In 1893, the cemetery house was built at a cost of $337.62 and moved to its present location in 1923.

== Notable Burials ==
- Mark Reeves Bacon
- Myron Hunt
- William May Garland
- Henry Mather Greene
- Frank Tenney Johnson
- Jay Johnstone
- William Myron Keck
- Richard Lacy
- Chi Mui
- Merlin Olson
- George S. Patton
- Laura Scudder
- Benjamin Davis Wilson AKA Don Benito Wilson
- Mary Letitia Jones (Los Angeles City Librarian)
