= Café Bustelo =

US brand of espresso-ground coffee beans

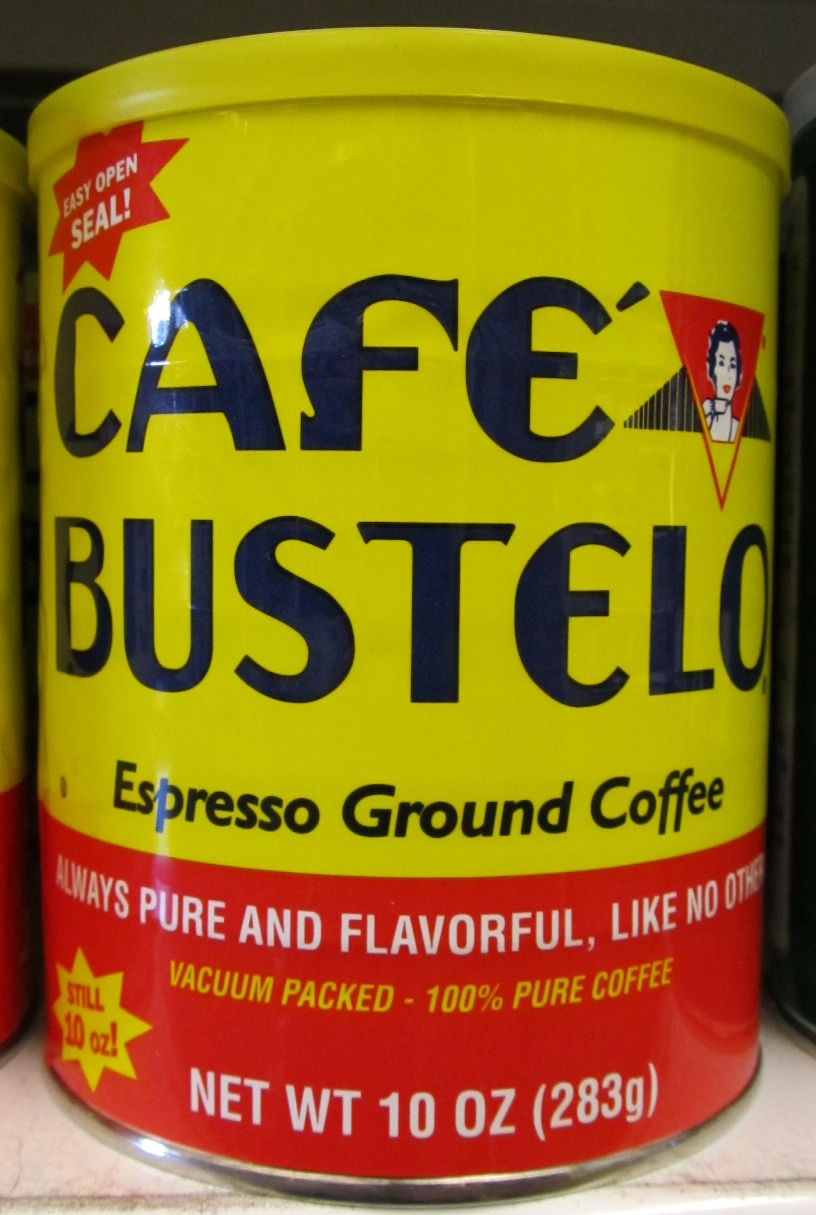
- Product type: Coffee
- Current owner: J.M. Smucker
- Country: U.S.
- Introduced: 1928; 98 years ago by Gregorio Menendez Bustelo
- Related brands: Dunkin' at Home, Folgers
- Website: cafebustelo.com

Café Bustelo is an American coffee brand owned by The J.M. Smucker Company. Its coffee is roasted in New Orleans.

== History ==
Gregorio Menéndez Bustelo (1892–1965) traveled from his native Asturias, Spain (Note: Bustelo has been cited as being born in Galicia in numerous occasions, but immigration records name Luarca as his birth place.) to Cuba as a young man, and moved to the United States in 1917. He founded the Café Bustelo coffee company in East Harlem, New York in 1928. His product became popular among Cuban exiles who preferred to prepare it in espresso coffeemakers rather than the then-common method of filtering it through a coffee "sock". The company remained successful throughout the 20th century, and was known for its distinctive yellow and red cans.

Café Bustelo was purchased by Rowland Coffee Roasters of Miami in 2000. Rowland was acquired by the Cuban-American Souto family the same year, and sold to the J.M. Smucker Company in 2011.

== Cultural impact ==
Bustelo gained a particular cachet among artistic and hipster subcultures in the 1990s and 2000s. It is referenced by name in the song "Today 4 U" from the 1996 musical Rent.

The Bustelo image and logo have also been creatively utilized by multiple artists who use the Bustelo theme in their paintings, prints, etc.
