= Robin Hood Flour =

Canadian brand

- Formerly: Moose Jaw Milling Company
- Founded: 1909; 117 years ago
- Headquarters: Markham, Ontario, Canada
- Website: www.robinhood.ca

Robin Hood Flour is a brand of flour made by the Horizon Milling division of Cargill. The brand is marketed to the food service and industrial section by Horizon Milling and the consumer retail sector by The J.M. Smucker Company.

== History ==
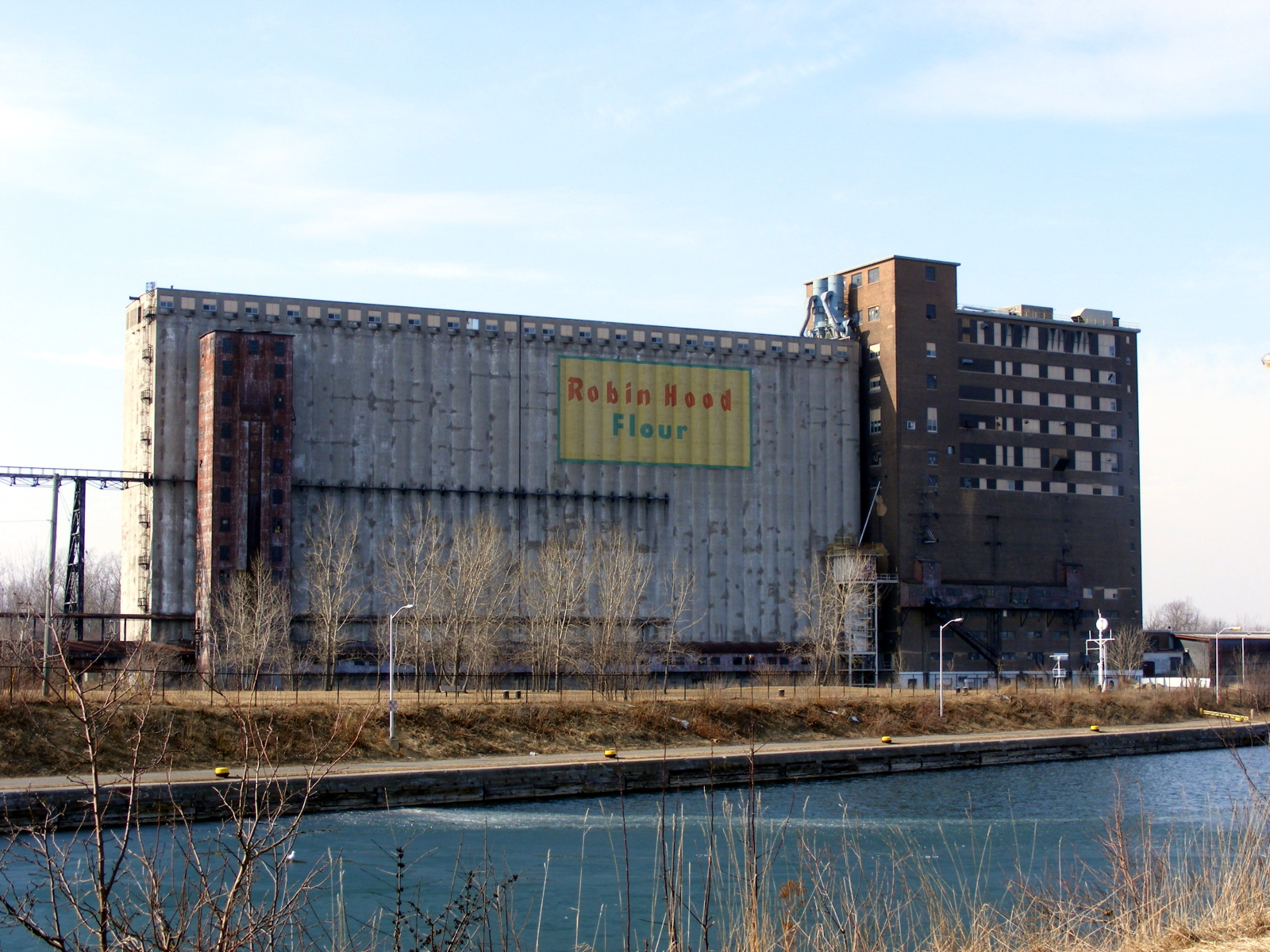
Former Robin Hood Flour Mill in Port Colborne, Ontario

Originally established as a brand of the Moose Jaw Milling Company by miller Donald Mclean in 1900. New Prague Flouring Mill (of Minnesota), owned by Francis Atherton Bean of Minneapolis, purchased the mill in 1909. The company manufactured flour under the brand names Keynote, Saskana and Robin Hood.

== Acquisitions ==
Through a series of acquisitions and restructurings, the company became International Multifoods Corporation in 1970. The Moose Jaw mill closed in 1966 due to excess capacity; the mill was demolished but the grain bins and elevator are still in use as an inland terminal owned and operated by Parrish and Heimbecker Ltd.

The newer Saskatoon mill (built in 1928) continues to manufacture the Robin Hood brand flour.

In June 2004, The J.M. Smucker Company purchased three milling facilities in Canada from International Multifoods, including the Robin Hood brand. In 2006, Smuckers announced the sale of the milling facilities in Canada for US$78 million to Horizon Milling G.P., a unit of Cargill. Under the agreement, Horizon Milling owns and operates the Canadian mills in Saskatoon, Montreal and Burlington that manufacture Robin Hood branded products. Horizon Milling markets Robin Hood products directly to the food service and industrial sector in Canada, U.S. and Caribbean. Smuckers continues to market Robin Hood products to the retail market.

== See also ==
- Arthur H. Hider
