= Goober (brand) =

Food product

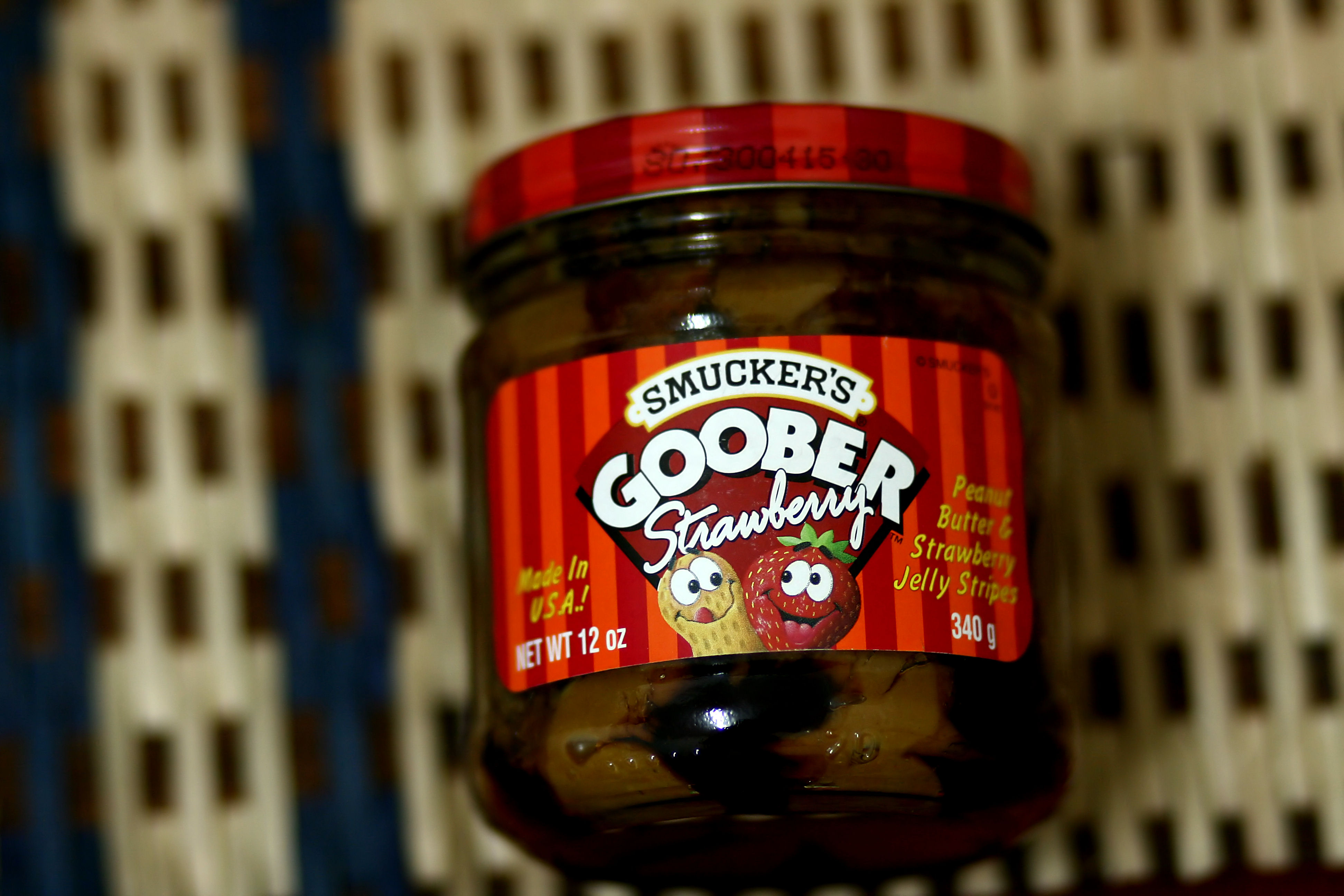
A photo of Smucker's Goober Strawberry

Goober is a combination of peanut butter and jelly in a single jar. It is sold in US, the UK, Canada, Singapore, and other parts of the Commonwealth, and is named after a familiar denomination for peanut in American English, goober pea, from the Gullah name for the peanut, guber. Goober was introduced by The J.M. Smucker Company under the Smucker's brand.

== About ==
Goober was introduced in 1968. It consists of alternating vertical stripes of peanut butter and either grape or strawberry flavored jelly, or chocolate. There is also a Goober variant that consists of alternating vertical stripes of honey and either chocolate or peanut butter.

== Similar products ==
A similar product is sold by Kroger under their subsidiary Ralphs brand name as: Yipes! Stripes! under Kroger's Disney Magic Selections label.
