= Orrville, Ohio =

- City
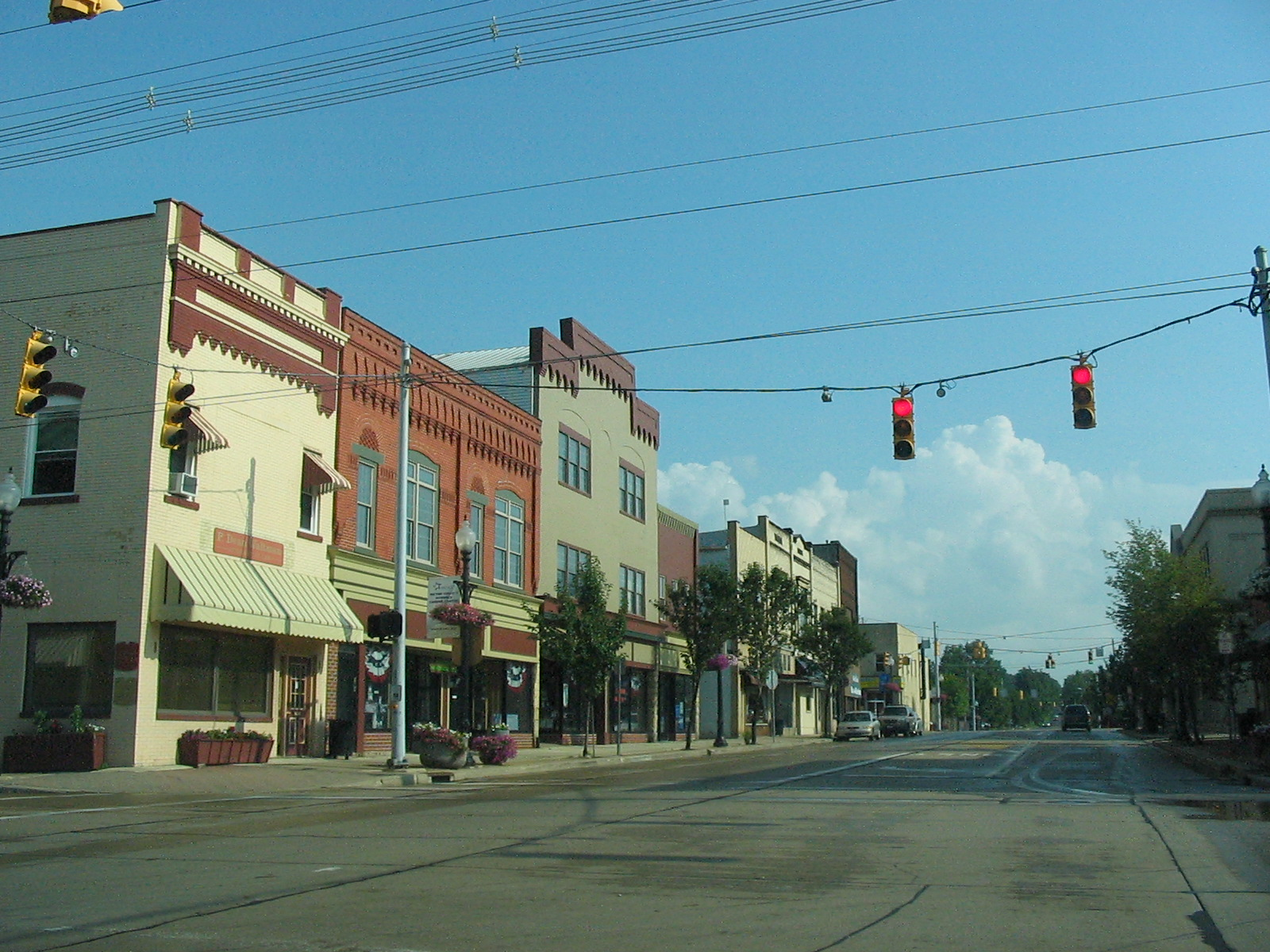
- Central Orrville
- Motto: A City of Diversified Industry
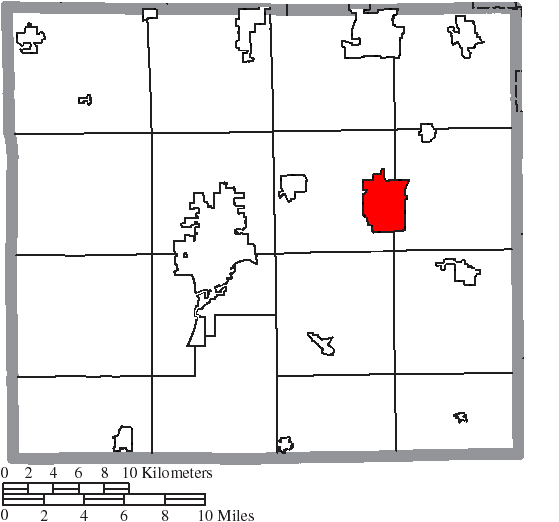
- Location of Orrville in Wayne County

- Location within Ohio Location within the United States
- Coordinates: 40°51′00″N 81°45′40″W
- Country: United States
- State: Ohio
- County: Wayne

Area
  - Total: 5.62 sq mi (14.55 km^{2})
  - Land: 5.61 sq mi (14.53 km^{2})
  - Water: 0.012 sq mi (0.03 km^{2})
- Elevation: 1,043 ft (318 m)

Population (2020)
  - Total: 8,452
  - Density: 1,506.9/sq mi (581.82/km^{2})
- Time zone: UTC-5 (Eastern (EST))
  - Summer (DST): UTC-4 (EDT)
- ZIP code: 44667
- Area code: 330
- FIPS code: 3958828
- GNIS feature ID: 2396086
- Website: orrville.com

Orrville is a city in Wayne County, Ohio, United States. It is about 9 miles (14 km) east of Wooster and 20 miles (32 km) southwest of Akron. The population was 8,452 at the 2020 census. It is part of the Wooster micropolitan area. The city is the headquarters of The J.M. Smucker Company, a food and beverage company mostly known for its production of namesake jellies.

== History ==
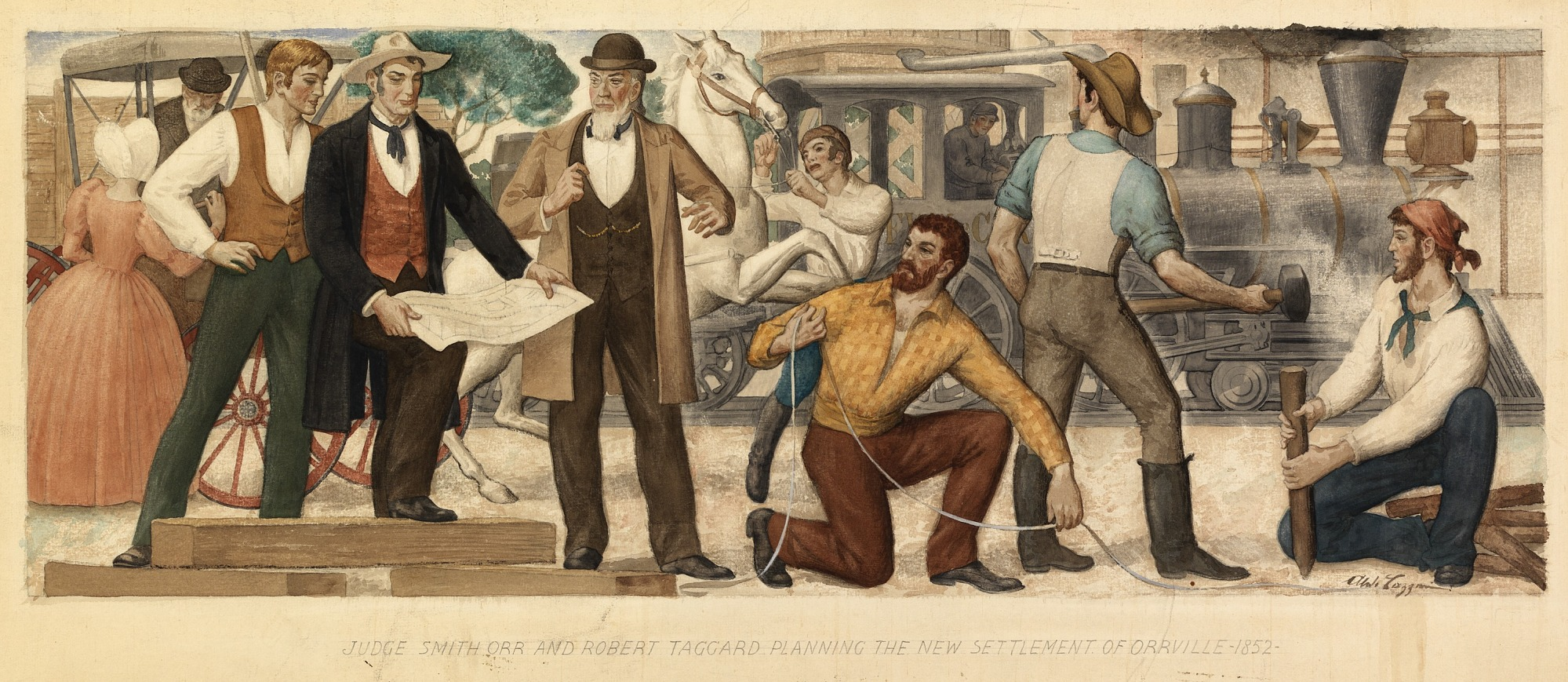
Judge Smith Orr and Robert Taggard Planning the New Settlement of Orrville in 1852 (by Aldo Lazzarini)

Orrville was laid out in 1852 and named after Judge Smith Orr, its proprietor. A post office called Orrville has been in operation since 1852.

== Geography ==
According to the United States Census Bureau, the city has a total area of 5.75 square miles (14.89 km^{2}), of which 5.74 square miles (14.87 km^{2}) is land and 0.01 square miles (0.03 km^{2}) is water.

== Demographics ==
Historical population
Census	Pop.	Note	%±
1870	745		—
1880	1,441		93.4%
1890	1,765		22.5%
1900	1,901		7.7%
1910	3,101		63.1%
1920	4,107		32.4%
1930	4,427		7.8%
1940	4,484		1.3%
1950	5,153		14.9%
1960	6,511		26.4%
1970	7,408		13.8%
1980	7,511		1.4%
1990	7,712		2.7%
2000	8,551		10.9%
2010	8,380		−2.0%
2020	8,452		0.9%
2025 (est.)	8,461		0.1%

=== 2020 census ===
As of the 2020 census, Orrville had a population of 8,452. The median age was 40.0 years. 22.6% of residents were under the age of 18 and 19.8% of residents were 65 years of age or older. For every 100 females there were 97.6 males, and for every 100 females age 18 and over there were 93.6 males age 18 and over.

98.9% of residents lived in urban areas, while 1.1% lived in rural areas.

There were 3,519 households in Orrville, of which 27.2% had children under the age of 18 living in them. Of all households, 45.9% were married-couple households, 18.9% were households with a male householder and no spouse or partner present, and 27.4% were households with a female householder and no spouse or partner present. About 29.7% of all households were made up of individuals and 13.7% had someone living alone who was 65 years of age or older.

There were 3,750 housing units, of which 6.2% were vacant. The homeowner vacancy rate was 1.1% and the rental vacancy rate was 7.8%.

Racial composition as of the 2020 census
Race	Number	Percent
White	7,058	83.5%
Black or African American	394	4.7%
American Indian and Alaska Native	29	0.3%
Asian	144	1.7%
Native Hawaiian and Other Pacific Islander	3	0.0%
Some other race	258	3.1%
Two or more races	566	6.7%
Hispanic or Latino (of any race)	543	6.4%

=== 2010 census ===
At the 2010 census, there were 8,380 people, 3,337 households, and 2,273 families living in the city. The population density was 1,459.9 inhabitants per square mile (563.7/km^{2}). There were 3,690 housing units at an average density of 642.9 per square mile (248.2/km^{2}). The racial makeup of the city was 89.7% White, 4.9% African American, 0.1% Native American, 1.3% Asian, 1.3% from other races, and 2.6% from two or more races. Hispanic or Latino of any race were 3.5%.

Of the 3,337 households, 32.5% had children under the age of 18 living with them, 49.9% were married couples living together, 13.8% had a female householder with no husband present, 4.5% had a male householder with no wife present, and 31.9% were non-families. 26.5% of households were one person and 11.9% were one person aged 65 or older. The average household size was 2.48 and the average family size was 2.96.

The median age was 39 years. 24.3% of residents were under the age of 18; 8.7% were between the ages of 18 and 24; 23.8% were from 25 to 44; 26.9% were from 45 to 64; and 16.1% were 65 or older. The gender makeup of the city was 48.7% male and 51.3% female.

=== 2000 census ===
At the 2000 census, there were 8,551 people, 3,305 households, and 2,343 families living in the city. The population density was 1,600.8 inhabitants per square mile (618.1/km^{2}). There were 3,489 housing units at an average density of 653.2 per square mile (252.2/km^{2}). The racial makeup of the city was 90.89% White, 5.93% African American, 0.16% Native American, 1.15% Asian, 0.01% Pacific Islander, 0.51% from other races, and 1.34% from two or more races. Hispanic or Latino of any race were 1.29%. Of the 3,305 households 35.2% had children under the age of 18 living with them, 54.4% were married couples living together, 12.2% had a female householder with no husband present, and 29.1% were non-families. 24.8% of households were one person and 10.0% were one person aged 65 or older. The average household size was 7.55 and the average family size was 3.04.

The age distribution was 27.6% under the age of 18, 8.4% from 18 to 24, 29.7% from 25 to 44, 21.2% from 45 to 64, and 13.1% 65 or older. The median age was 36 years. For every 100 females, there were 94.0 males. For every 100 females age 18 and over, there were 87.6 males.

The median household income was $36,500 and the median family income was $46,728. Males had a median income of $32,565 versus $25,252 for females. The per capita income for the city was $17,419. About 5.7% of families and 7.7% of the population were below the poverty line, including 7.3% of those under age 18 and 8.2% of those age 65 or over.

== Economy ==
Orrville is the corporate headquarters for The J.M. Smucker Company and its fruit spread producing facility, which Smucker's asserts is the largest in the world. Other firms based in the city include Smith Dairy Products Company, Schantz Organ Company, The Will-Burt Company, Catrone Trucking founded in 1946 by Tony Catrone, And The Quality Castings Co.

== Education ==
The public Orrville City School District serves the city, which includes one elementary school, one middle school, and Orrville High School. Additionally, the Wayne College branch campus of the University of Akron is located in Orrville.

== Notable people ==
- Mike Birkbeck, Major League Baseball player
- Heber Blankenhorn, journalist and labor activist
- Tim Hiller, former standout quarterback at Western Michigan University
- Bob Knight, college basketball head coach
- Jenny Scobel, painter
- Mark Smucker, CEO of the J.M. Smucker Company
