= Jif (peanut butter) =

American brand of peanut butter

JIF

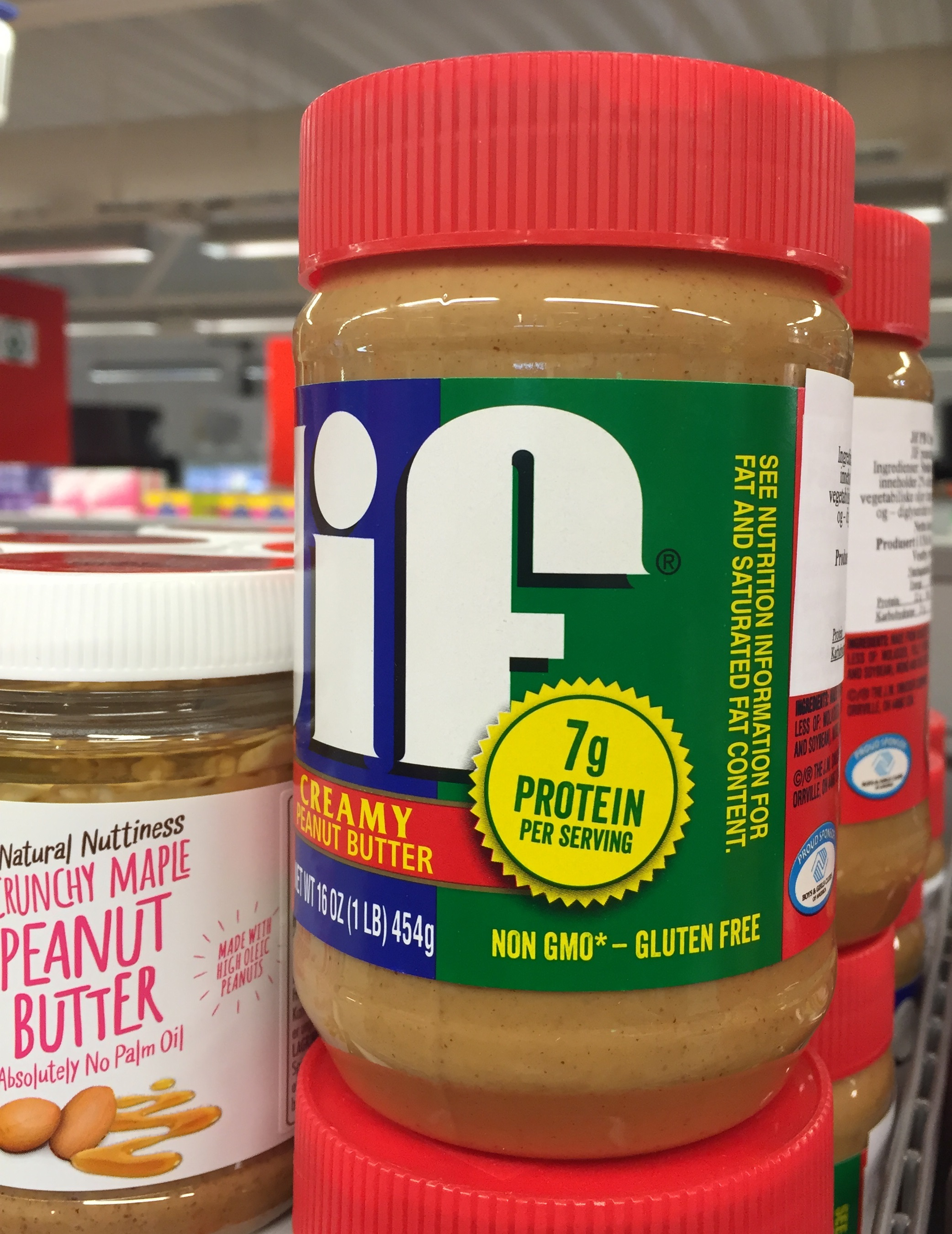
- Product type: Peanut butter
- Current owner: The J.M. Smucker Company
- Country: United States
- Introduced: 1956; 70 years ago
- Markets: World
- Previous owners: Procter & Gamble
- Tagline: "That Jif'ing Good"
- Website: www.jif.com

Jif (sometimes printed as JIF, stylized as JiF) is an American brand of peanut butter made by the J.M. Smucker Company. It was first created as "Big Top" by William T. Young in 1946, then purchased by Procter & Gamble (P&G) in 1955 and renamed to "Jif". J.M. Smucker later purchased the brand from P&G in 2002. Its products are produced at a facility in Lexington, Kentucky, which is the largest peanut butter production facility in the world.

== History ==
In 1946, Jif was created by William T. Young in Lexington, Kentucky, named "Big Top" at the time. In 1955, Procter & Gamble bought Big Top peanut butter and its manufacturing facilities in Lexington from William T. Young. In the ensuing years, the company reformulated and rebranded it to compete with Skippy and Peter Pan. P&G named its product Jif, used oils other than peanut oil in its hydrogenation process, and sweetened the recipe, adding sugar and molasses. The new product was publicly announced in April 1956, as tests of the product began in select markets. In 1981, Jif became the largest peanut butter brand in the United States, a position it held at least through 2008. In 2001, the J.M. Smucker Company purchased the brand from P&G.

=== 2022 recall ===
On May 20, 2022, the J.M. Smucker Company announced that their peanut butter products, which were manufactured in their Lexington, Kentucky plant, were recalled in the US and Canada due to potential salmonella contamination. The company estimated a loss of $125 million as a result of the 2022 recall. On July 19, 2022, a class-action lawsuit was filed against J.M. Smucker Co. over the contaminated peanut butter.

As of July 27, 2022, 21 people in 17 states had fallen ill after consuming Jif peanut butter. The contaminated peanut butter also affects countries in the world that import the product.

== Advertising ==
In 1958, the brand rollout in the U.S. involved a heavily publicized house-to-house distribution of free sample jars from special trucks emblazoned with the then Jif mascot, the "Jifaroo", a blue kangaroo. An early slogan was "Jif is never dry; a touch of honey tells you why." Early advertising also emphasized the beveled edge of the jar base, meant to make it easier to get the last bit of Jif out of the corner. For many decades, TV commercials for the product ended with the tagline, "Choosy mothers choose Jif", and, in the 1990s, "Choosy moms choose Jif." From 1998 to 2000, there was a musical jingle that accompanied many Jif ads, which used the lyrics, "Moms like you choose Jif, choose Jif!"

== Manufacturing ==
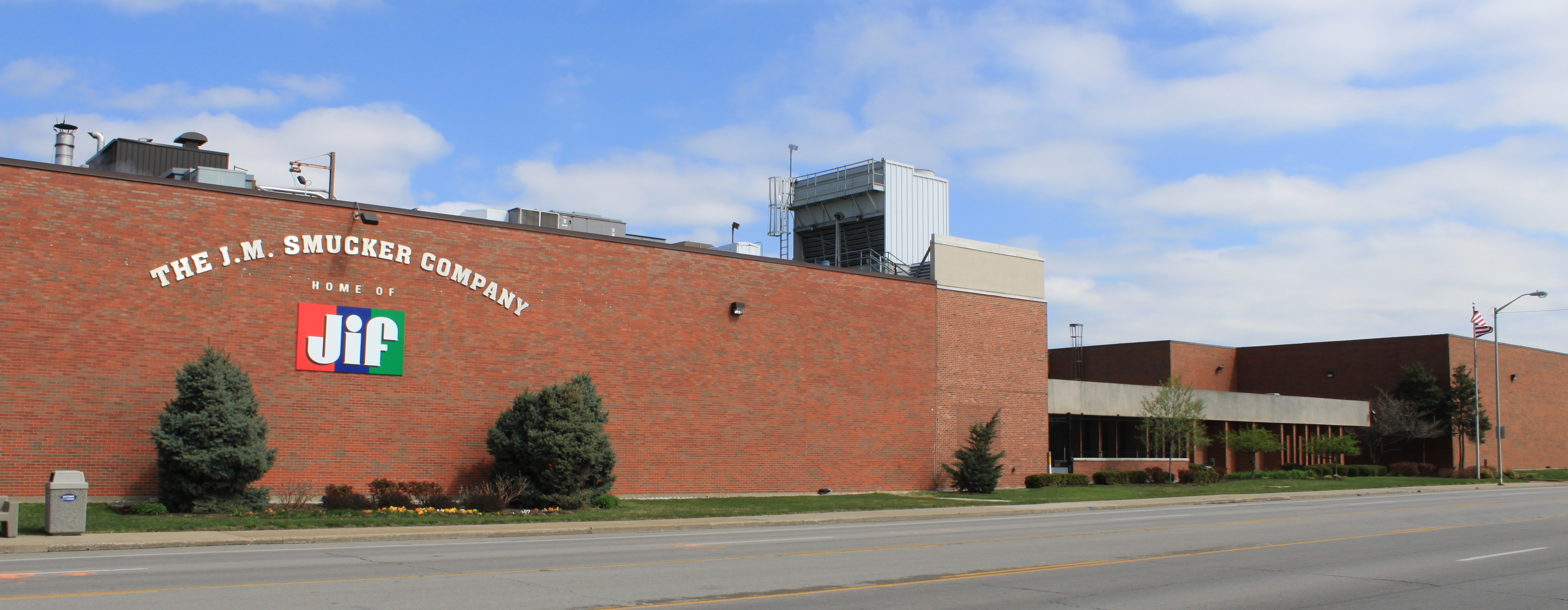
Jif production plant in Lexington, Kentucky

The original Creamy and Crunchy style Jif peanut butters both made their nationwide debut in 1958. In 1974, Extra Crunchy Jif was introduced, followed in 1991 by Simply Jif, a peanut butter variant with low sodium and less sugar than regular Jif. Reduced Fat Jif was introduced three years later in 1994.

There are 9 different kinds of Jif Peanut Butter:

- Creamy
- Extra Crunchy
- No Sugar Added Creamy
- Simply Jif Creamy (low sodium and sugar)
- Omega-3 Creamy
- Reduced Fat Creamy
- Natural Creamy
- Natural Honey Creamy
- Natural Crunchy

Jif is also available in a three-pack and an eight-pack of 1.5-ounce individual servings of Jif peanut butter, sold under the name "Jif to Go". In 2014, Jif introduced a peanut butter-flavored breakfast cereal (manufactured under license by Kellogg's). On May 7, 2012, Jif announced a new line of hazelnut spreads, to be produced in Chocolate and Mocha Cappuccino flavors. In addition, Jif also makes almond butter and cashew butter.

All variants of Jif are produced at a facility in Lexington, KY, which is the largest peanut butter production facility in the world, and a smaller facility in Memphis, TN, whose products were not affected by the 2022 recall.
