= Pure Food Building =

Demolished display hall at the Canadian National Exhibition

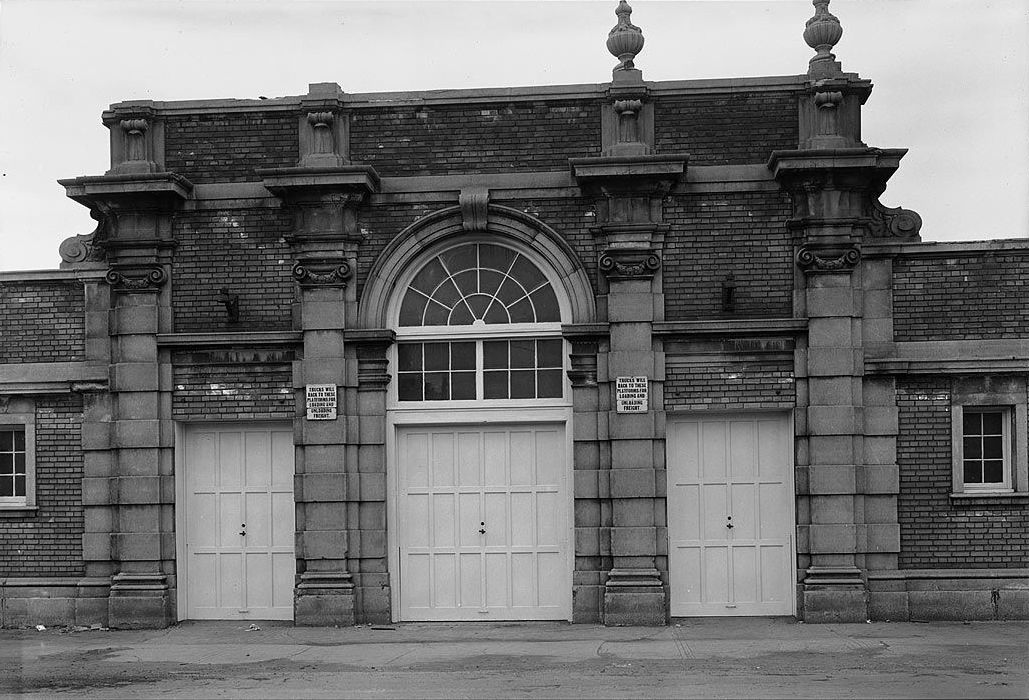
- Pure Food Building, 1941, before repairs

- Location within Toronto

General information
- Status: Demolished
- Location: Exhibition Place, Toronto, Ontario, Canada
- Coordinates: 43°38′05″N 79°25′10″W
- Opened: 1922
- Demolished: 1953
- Cost: $100,000 (1922)
- Owner: City of Toronto

Design and construction
- Architect: Bernard Herman Prack

The Pure Food Building was a facility opened in 1922 on Exhibition Place at the Canadian National Exhibition (CNE) in Toronto, Ontario, Canada. It was demolished after the 1953 CNE to make way for the modernist Food Building, which still stands.

== Architecture ==
The building featured six open-air courts, with booths arranged in squares, built in Italianate architecture. Ads billed it as the "largest and most costly permanent exhibition building in the world." The 26,900-square-foot (2,500 m^{2}) first unit of the building was lit by 1000 kilowatt lamps, requiring 300 kilowatts to light it; several floodlights gave the "entrances to the building... a brilliant effect".

== History of the building ==
=== Planning and construction (1920-1922) ===
The Globe reported that, as of September 1920, a Pure Food Building was being considered by the directors. Other buildings proposed were a Temple of Music, a second Transportation Building, and an Electric Building. The Pure Food Association and American architect Bernard Herman Prack presented a design for a Pure Food Building to the CNE Association in October. Final plans for the building were to be prepared by the City Architect of Toronto. Exhibitors at the building would commit to a period of ten years, paying over that period for its construction cost, after which it would be owned by the City. It was the first new building as part of a scheduled 50-year development plan. The Toronto Board of Control and CNE board arranged a conference in November 1920, to discuss the creation of a $150,000 building devoted to "pure food". The proposal was that exhibitors "carry all interest and debt charges for twenty years," if City funding were provided. Later in the month, Toronto City Council was to consider whether to apply to the Province "for the authority to issue debentures" for the structure.

In February 1921, it was reported to the Canadian National Exhibition Association board that "headway was being made" in signing up exhibitors. The City had voted in favour of a $150,000 building to open in 1921, if guarantees were met. Tenders for construction of half the building were opened in September, the lowest being $116,500.

The land used for the building was outdoor space for agricultural and life stock exhibits; they were moved to the eastern end of the site.

=== Early years (1922–1942) ===
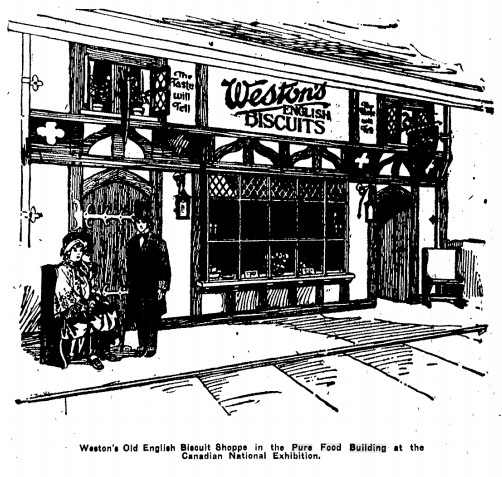
Weston's display at Pure Food Building, promoting their new line of English biscuits, made in Toronto by English master bakers and baking machines. The Globe deemed it "quaint and picturesque"; they described "its low gabled roof, diamond windows and stout oaken beams".

The Toronto Daily Star described the building as "attractive and quaint... a complete departure from all precedent in the way of exhibition buildings." Comparatively, The Coliseum, opened the previous winter to present livestock, was "less imaginative architecturally." The Globe suggested the building demonstrated the "growing popularity of the segregation principle," referring to the grouping of exhibits by theme. An exhibitor at the Electrical Building noted a rise in visitors, crediting it to the fact their building was located en route to both Pure Food and the Coliseum, when entering through the Dufferin Gates.

Textile manufacturers were announced in March 1922 to be considering their own structure.

Early tenants included:
Borden's
Canadian Milk Products Limited
Keepsweet Table Cream
Lion Brand Macaroni (A. Puccini & Co., Limited)
O'Keefe's Carbonated Beverages
Weston's Olde English Shoppe

As of April 1922, the CNE noted that all of the Pure Food Building space was allotted, and 25 late applicants had been denied. (Despite around 40 exhibitors moving from the Manufacturer's Building to Pure Food, and the existence of a Dairy Building, the earlier building was sold out by April as well.) They continued to receive many applications for space at the building after the event, including a request for 20 spaces from the British Federation of Industries. The organization decided on a 19,000 square foot addition, to cost $100,000. Association second vice-president G. T. Irving appeared before the Toronto parks committee in November, asking for funding. They promised their full support when the matter was to appear before city council, and the property committee similarly recommended the board be allowed to make interim expenditures on concrete piers. Given the high tariffs charged by the United States at the time, The Manchester Guardian felt it was "a specially favorable time for pushing British trade in Canada." The Star ran an editorial about Canada-British trade, suggesting that the Exhibition's support "for the promotion of trade within the Empire is a laudable project." Indeed, there was a Federation of British Industries Section at the fair in 1923.

Grocery stores Dominion Stores and Loblaws Groceterias were added as of 1926.

=== Repairs and additions (1942–1952) ===
Repairs were done to the building in 1941 and 1942.

The building became known for samples; an anonymous Toronto Star writer commented in 1948 that the "hundreds of samples" of yesteryear were replaced with "pay as you go" and a few long lineups. Similarly, a photo caption for the 1951 Canadian Restaurant Association conference describes the samples at that event of reminding visitors of the "halycon days" in Pure Food.

Construction began in mid-August 1949 to create a permanent 60-by-30-foot (18.3 m × 9.1 m) structure for Borden Foods mascot Elsie the Cow, a real jersey cattle, at the southeast corner of the grounds.

=== New building announced (1953) ===
CNE executive under President J. A. Northey approved a new $1.5 million structure to replace the existing Pure Food Building in 1954, to be built on the same site. The demolition was to begin immediately after the 1953 Exhibition was over, and have 50% more exhibition space.

== Gallery ==
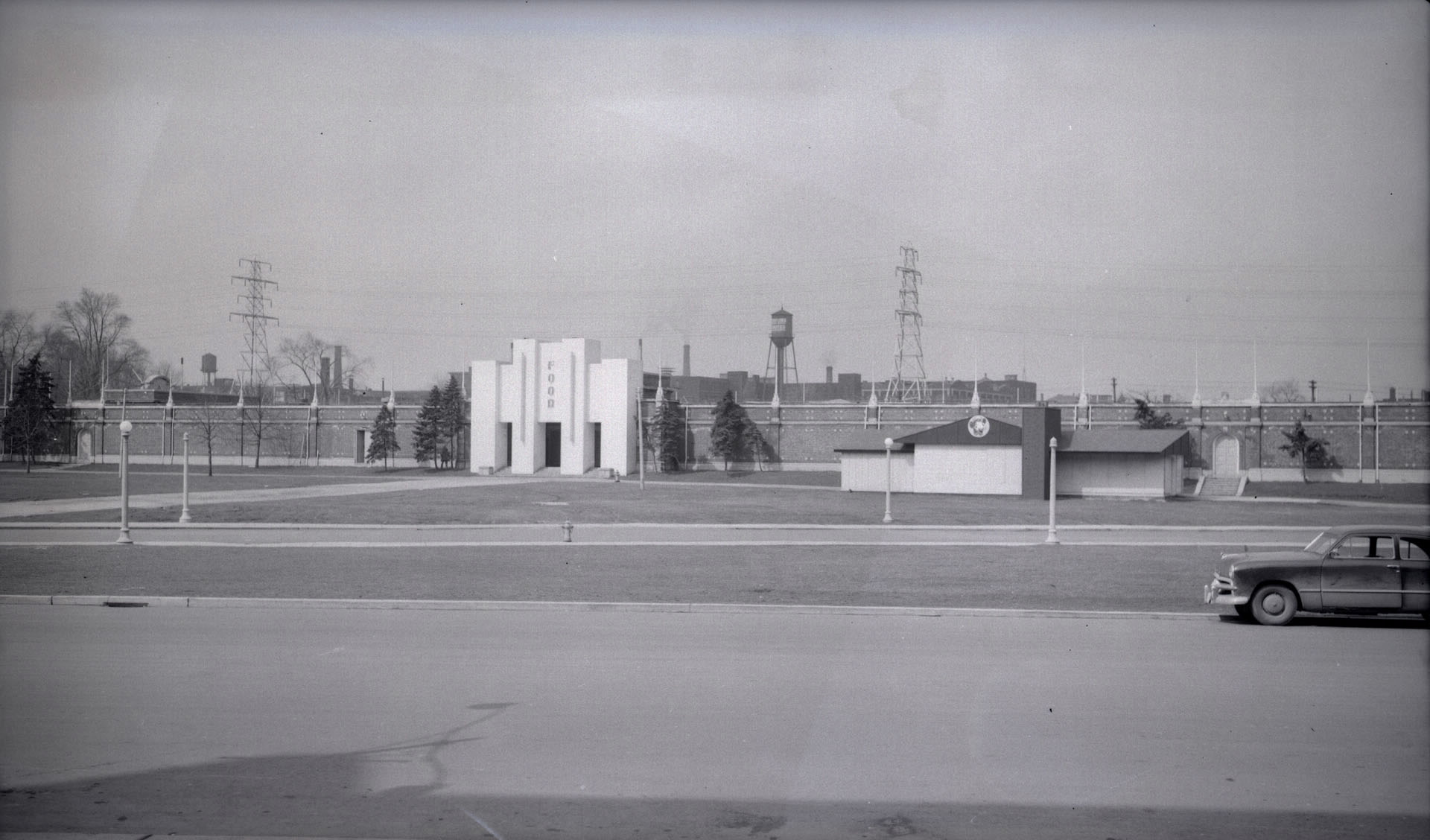
View of Pure Food Building from south, 1952

== See also ==
- Pacific National Exhibition, Pure Foods Building built in 1931
- Ottawa SuperEX, Pure Foods Building built in 1955
- Western Fair, Pure Foods Building existed as of 1922
