= New World Pasta =

American pasta manufacturer

New World Pasta Corporation
- Type: Corporation
- Founded: (January 27, 1999; 27 years ago)
- Defunct: 2021
- Fate: Brands sold to Barilla, TreeHouse Foods, and Post Holdings
- Headquarters: Harrisburg, Pennsylvania, U.S.
- Number of locations: 5
- Area served: North America
- Key people: Bastiaan de Zeeuw (CEO)
- Products: Pasta, Noodle
- Website: Official Website at the Wayback Machine (archived 2016-12-19)

The New World Pasta Company, a wholly owned subsidiary of Ebro Foods, was a retail branded pasta manufacturer headquartered in Harrisburg, Pennsylvania. The company was formed in 1999 when the Hershey Company's pasta business was divested to a private equity group. After its formation, New World Pasta acquired the four remaining brands of Borden's pasta business in July 2001 that the American Italian Pasta Company had not purchased a month earlier (Prince, Creamette, Catelli, and Lancia). New World Pasta declared bankruptcy in 2004. In 2006 it was acquired by Ebro Puleva S.A., a food company based in Spain.

As part of Ebro Puleva, New World Pasta acquired Strom Products in 2012, including the No Yolks and Wacky Mac brands.

Effective January 1, 2017, American Rice, Inc., and New World Pasta Company merged into Riviana Foods Inc.

On November 5, 2020, it was announced that the American Beauty, Creamette, Light 'n Fluffy, No Yolks, Prince, San Giorgio, Skinner, and Wacky Mac brands would be sold to TreeHouse Foods. This was followed by the sale of the Catelli and Lancia brands to Barilla on February 1, 2021, and the flagship Ronzoni brand to Post Holdings on March 30, 2021.

== Former brands ==
=== United States ===
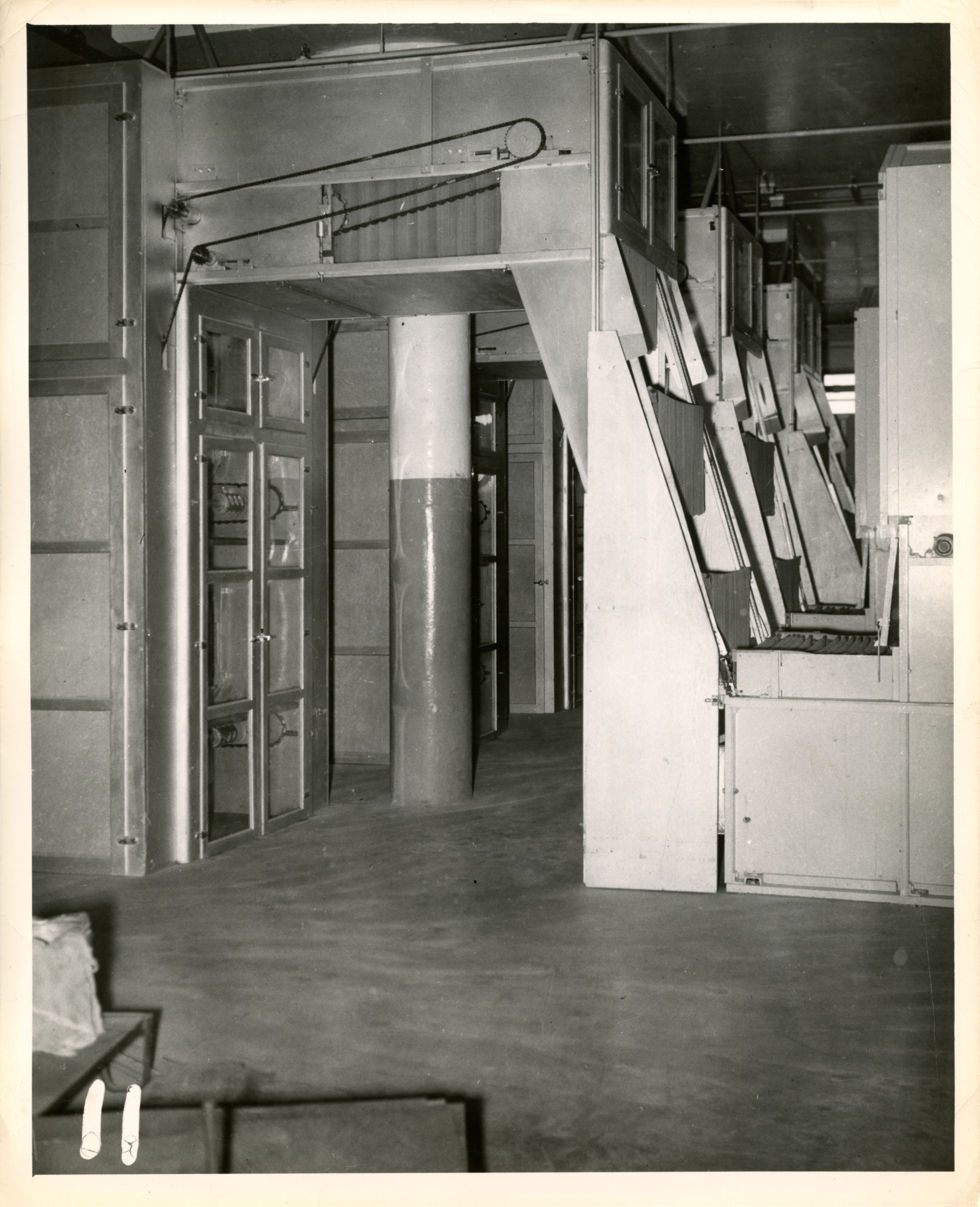
Three dry pasta lines making spaghetti at the Ronzoni Macaroni Company factory in New York, c. 1960

==== Sold to Post Holdings ====
- Ronzoni - The flagship brand of New World Pasta, available in Alabama, Connecticut, Florida, Georgia, Maryland, Massachusetts, New Jersey, New York, North Carolina, Oregon, Pennsylvania, Puerto Rico, Rhode Island, South Carolina, and Washington.

==== Sold to TreeHouse Foods ====
- American Beauty - Available in Arizona, Arkansas, California, Colorado, Idaho, Kansas, Montana, Nevada, New Mexico, Oregon, Utah, Washington, and Wyoming.
- Creamette - Available in Illinois, Indiana, Iowa, Kentucky, Michigan, Minnesota, Missouri, North Carolina, North Dakota, Ohio, Pennsylvania, South Carolina, Virginia, West Virginia, and Wisconsin. Acquired from Borden in 2001.

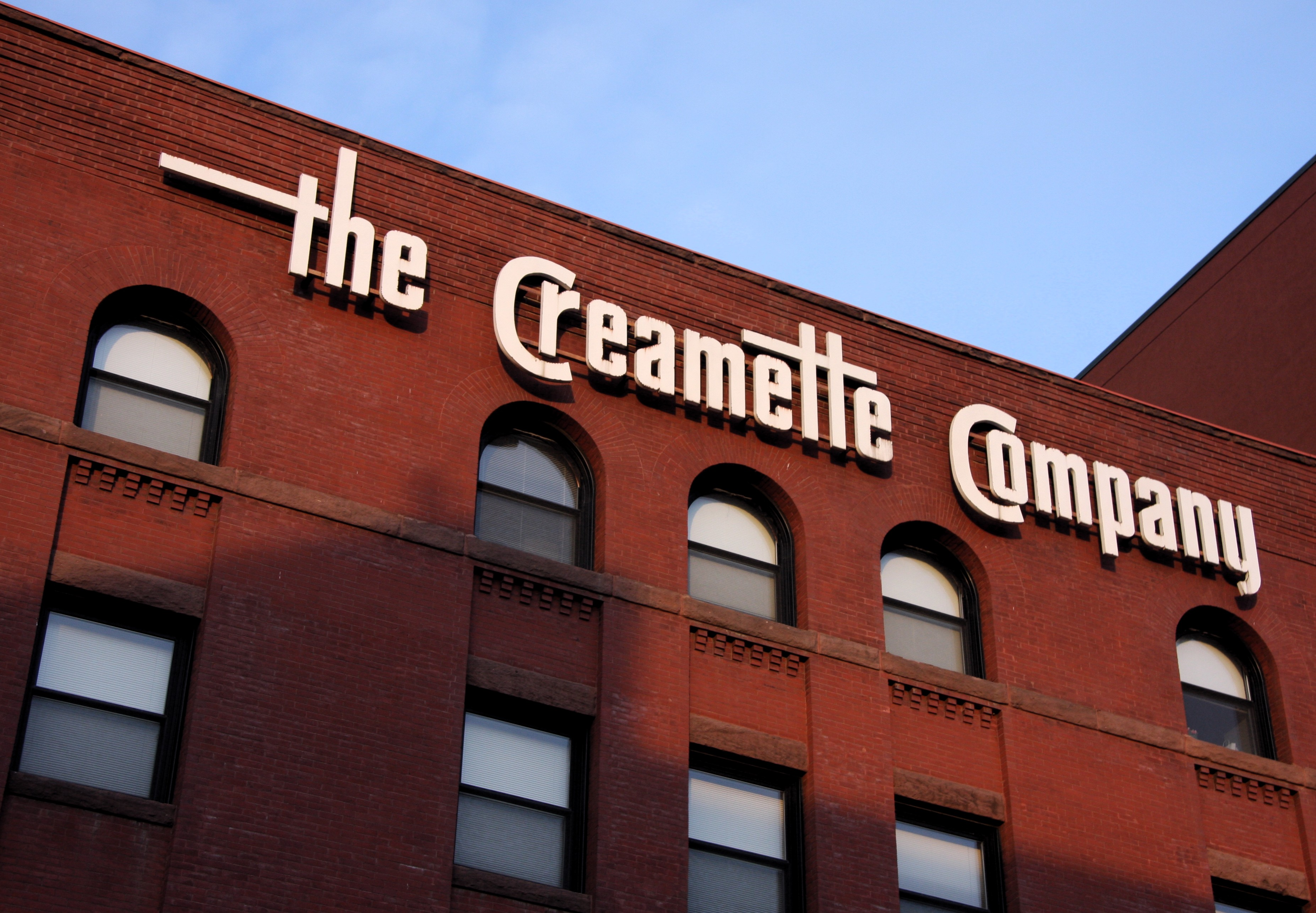
Creamette Company historic headquarters in Minneapolis

- Light 'n Fluffy - Available in all states east of the Mississippi River.
- No Yolks - Available nationwide.
- Prince - Available in Connecticut, Illinois, Maine, Massachusetts, Michigan, New Hampshire, New Jersey, New York, Rhode Island, and Vermont. Acquired from Borden in 2001.
- San Giorgio - Available in Delaware, Maryland, New Jersey, New York, Ohio, Oklahoma, Pennsylvania, Virginia, and West Virginia.
- Skinner - Available in Alabama, Arkansas, Louisiana, Mississippi, Nebraska, Oklahoma, and Texas.
- Wacky Mac - Available nationwide, sold exclusively at Walmart stores as of 2015.

=== Canada (sold to Barilla) ===
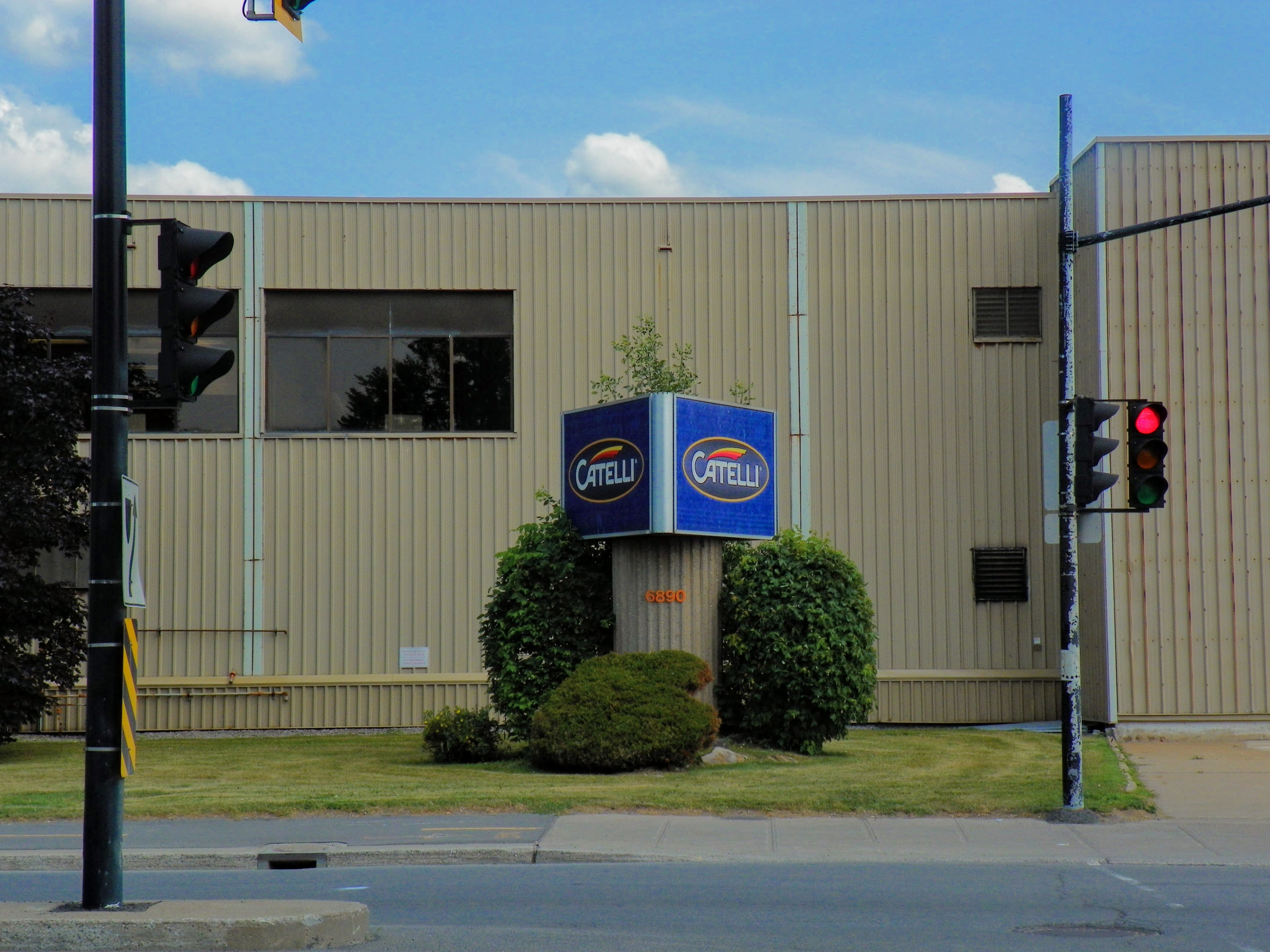
Catelli factory in the port of Montreal

- Catelli - Acquired from Borden in 2001. Replaced Ronzoni name in Canada since October 13, 2013.
- Lancia - Acquired from Borden in 2001.
