= Borden Dairy =

American dairy processor and distributor

Borden Dairy Company
- Type: Private
- Industry: Food
- Predecessor: Borden
- Founded: 2009; 17 years ago
- Founder: Gail Borden, Jr
- Headquarters: Dallas, Texas, United States
- Key people: Ed Fugger (CEO)
- Products: Milk, cream, buttermilk, dips, sour cream, cottage cheese, juices, tea, eggnog
- Brands: Borden
- Revenue: US$ 1.2 billion
- Owner: Capitol Peak Partners and KKR
- Number of employees: 1,350 (2024)
- Website: bordendairy.com

Borden Dairy Company is an American dairy processor and distributor headquartered in Dallas, Texas. Established in 2009, the company is a successor to the original Borden Company established in 1857 by Gail Borden. The company is a former subsidiary of Dean Foods.

On January 5, 2020, Borden Dairy Company filed for bankruptcy. "Despite our numerous achievements during the past 18 months, the company continues to be impacted by the rising cost of raw milk and market challenges facing the dairy industry," said CEO Tony Sarsam in a statement. Borden's filing says the company plans to stay in business during the bankruptcy process.

== History ==
Originally part of the Borden Company, the dairy subsidiary was sold in September 1997 to Southern Foods, which was controlled by the Mid-America Dairymen, now the Dairy Farmers of America (DFA). Southern Foods was subsequently acquired by Suiza Foods, now Dean Foods. The DFA retains ownership of Borden cheese.

In 2009, Grupo Lala of Mexico acquired National Dairy from DFA and began conducting US operations as Borden Dairy Company.

In 2013, Borden Dairy was spun off by Grupo Lala into a private company called Laguna Dairy, S.A. de C.V. In 2017, ACON Investments became the majority owner of the Borden dairy business, with Laguna Dairy retaining a substantial equity.

On January 5, 2020, Borden Dairy Company and sixteen affiliated companies filed Chapter 11 bankruptcy in the United States District Court for the District of Delaware citing declining sales. In his affidavit, Jason Monaco, the company's CFO, mentions that the company intends to reorganize and not liquidate its operations. He describes a difficult environment for milk producers that includes decreasing demand for milk, increased competition with non-dairy alternatives, the growth of discount grocery retailers, and the growth of private label alternatives.

In June 2020, it was announced that New Dairy Opco LLC had won the auction for most of Borden's assets, becoming the company's new owner. New Dairy Opco was led by a team composed of the former CEO of Dean Foods, Gregg Engles, and Kohlberg Kravis Roberts (KKR). At the time of the bankruptcy, Borden employed 3,300 workers.

== Elsie the Cow ==
"Elsie the Cow" advertising sign at a Borden's Dairy plant in Tyler, Texas, pictured in 2014

Elsie the Cow is Borden Dairy Company's mascot ("spokescow") that is used for the label on their products. Elsie was first introduced in 1936, appearing as one of four cartoon cows (with Mrs. Blossom, Bessie and Clara) in a series of advertisements that ran in medical journals. Elsie was created by a team that was led by advertising marketer David William Reid. In 1940, Reid also created for Elsie a fictional cartoon mate, Elmer the Bull, who was lent to Borden's then-chemical division as the mascot for Elmer's Glue. The pair was given calves Beulah and Beauregard in 1948, and twins Larabee and Lobelia in 1957.

In 2000, Advertising Age recognized Elsie the Cow as one of the top 10 advertising icons of all time.

Milk Products, LLC licenses the Borden name and Elsie the Cow trademark from Borden, Inc.'s successor company, Hexion Specialty Chemicals.

== Advertising ==
Selena Gomez was a spokesperson for Borden Milk and is featured in the campaign's print and television ads. When she was the spokesperson, she was also the star of the show Wizards of Waverly Place.

== Products ==
Borden produces and sells the following products of milk:

- Vitamin D
- 2% Reduced Fat
- 1% Lowfat
- Fat Free Skim
- Dutch Chocolate
- Dutch Chocolate 1%
- Lite Line
- High Protein

Borden produces and sells additional products in the following categories:

- Milk
- Cream
- Buttermilk
- Dips & Sour Cream
- Juices
- Teas
- Flavored Drinks

== Distribution ==
Borden products can be located in the states of Alabama, Colorado, Florida, Kentucky, Louisiana, Maryland, Mississippi, Missouri, Oklahoma, South Carolina, Texas, Tennessee and Ohio. Within these states, these products are sold in the stores and marts that mainly include Cain's, Calhoun Foods, Food World, Fresh Market, Greer's, Kmart, Kroger, Magnolia Super Foods, Pic-N-Sav, Piggly Wiggly, Marcs, Aldi, CVS, Dave's Supermarkets, Publix Supermarkets, Rainbow Foods, Rite Aid, Walgreens, Walmart and Winn Dixie.

As of May 2021, Borden Dairy operated 14 plants in the Midwest, Southern, and Southeastern regions of the U.S. and nearly 100 distribution centers.
