= Ebro Foods =

Food processing company

Ebro Foods, S.A.

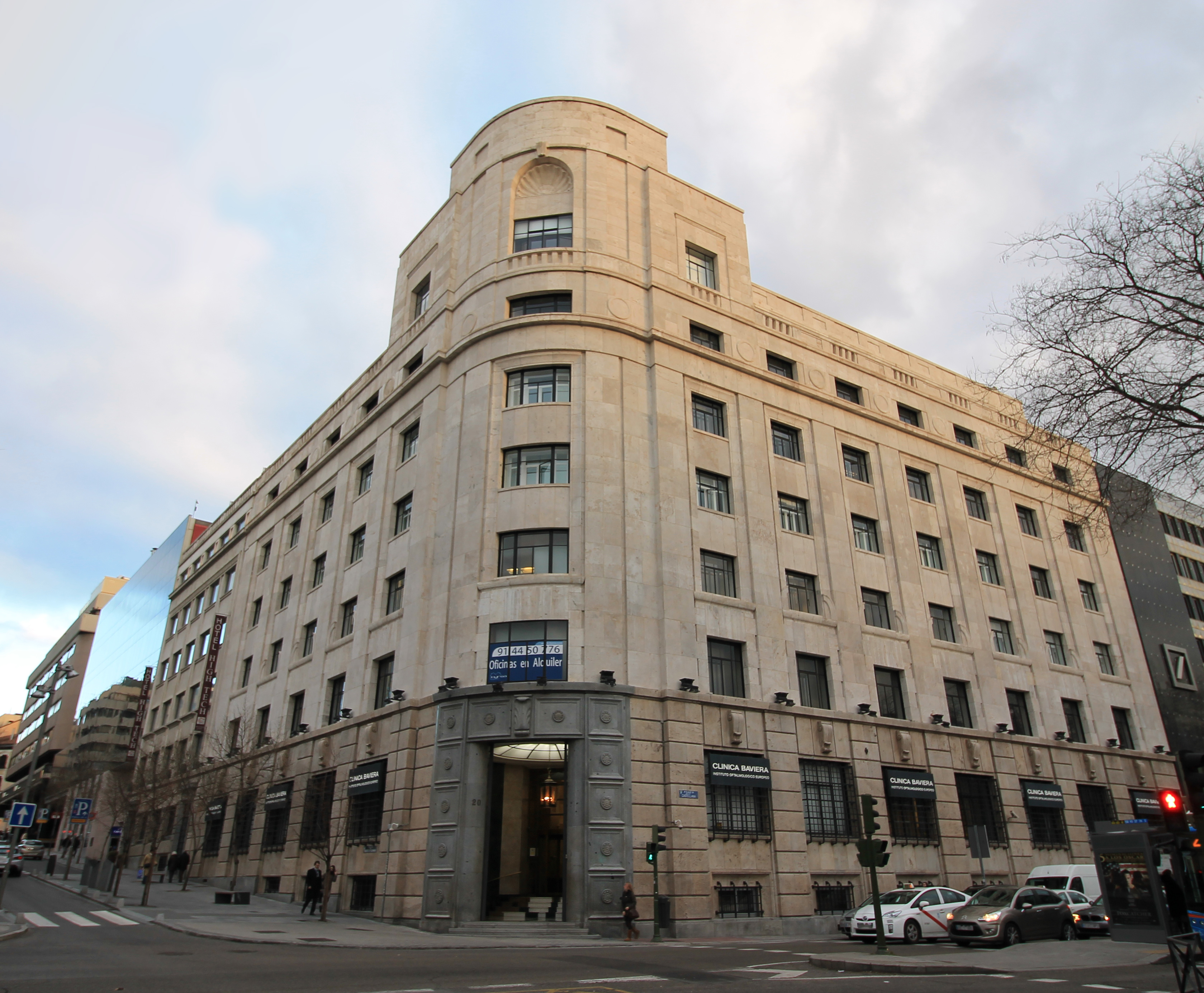
- Headquarters in Madrid, Spain
- Type: Sociedad Anónima
- Traded as: BMAD: EBRO
- ISIN: ES0112501012
- Industry: Food processing
- Founded: May 11, 1998
- Headquarters: Madrid, Spain
- Key people: Antonio Hernández Callejas (Chairman and CEO)
- Products: Rice, pasta and sauces, food technology
- Revenue: ▲€2.897 billion (2020)
- Operating income: ▲€242.62 million (2020)
- Net income: ▲€192.41 million (2020)
- Total assets: ▼€4.035 billion (2020)
- Total equity: ▼€1.927 billion (2020)
- Number of employees: 7,834 (2020)
- Website: www.ebrofoods.es

Ebro Foods, S.A. (/ˈiːbroʊ fuːdz/; Spanish: [ˈeβɾo ˈfuðs]), formerly Ebro Puleva, is a Spanish food processing company. Ebro Foods is the world's largest producer of rice and the second biggest producer of pasta (its Panzani brand is a market leader in France). The company's head office is in Madrid.

== History ==
In 2005, Ebro Foods sold Catesa Foods for $37.9m. Catesa Foods specializes in tropical fruits, flowers, and ornamental plants on Tenerife Island.

Ebro was previously the largest manufacturer of value-added dairy products in Spain, until it sold this business unit to Lactalis in March 2010 for €630 million. It also was Spain's largest sugar producer prior to the divestment of that division to the British Sugar subsidiary of Associated British Foods in 2009. Ebro Foods operates in 23 countries worldwide.

In December 2019, 55,000 pounds of rice from its brands, including Minute Rice and Mahatma Rice were donated to the Houston Food Bank.

In June 2021, Ebro Foods announced the sale of the Panzani and Ferrero brands to the investment fund CVC Capital Partners for €550 million.

== International development ==
Ebro Foods entered the U.S. market in 2004 when it acquired Houston-based Riviana Foods, which purchased American Rice in 2011 and now produces brands such as Mahatma, Success, Minute Rice, Water Maid and several private labels. In 2006, Ebro acquired New World Pasta, producer of Ronzoni, San Giorgio and other products, and which is also now under the Riviana corporate umbrella. Riviana Foods, New World Pasta, and American Rice united under the Riviana Foods name in 2017 to become the largest manufacturer of rice and second-largest manufacturer of pasta in the U.S.

Ebro Foods owns the Puleva Biotech subsidiary, which engages in the research and development of new functional food products.

It has a biofuel production joint venture with Abengoa.

== Riviana Foods ==
Riviana Foods Inc. is a subsidiary of Ebro Foods, S.A. When it merged with American Rice, Inc. and New World Pasta Co. in 2017, it became the largest manufacturer and marketer of rice products and second largest of pasta products in the United States. Its estimated sales revenue at the time was $1.5 billion.

Riviana's brands include Minute Rice and Ronzoni pasta.

=== History ===
==== Early years ====
Riviana dates back to the 1911 founding of the Louisiana State Rice Milling Company, Inc., a consortium of thirty rice mills led by Frank Godchaux Sr. By 1931, the Louisiana State Rice Milling Company, Inc. introduced consumer-friendly packaging.

==== Mergers and acquisitions ====
In 1965, Louisiana State Rice Milling Company merged with River Brand Rice Mills, Inc to form Riviana Foods Inc. After being acquired by Colgate-Palmolive in 1976, and then sold back to the Godchaux family in 1986, Riviana became a publicly traded company on NASDAQ. Riviana was most recently acquired by Ebro Foods, S.A. in 2004. In 2006, Riviana acquired Minute Rice, a brand of parboiled rice, from Kraft Foods. In 2011, Riviana Foods Inc. acquired American Rice, Inc., which owned several rice brands, including Comet Rice and Blue Ribbon Rice. In 2017, American Rice, Inc. and New World Pasta merged into Riviana Foods Inc.

== Riviana Foods rice brands and products ==
=== Carolina Rice ===
Carolina Rice, founded in 1927, is primarily sold in the northeast United States. Carolina Rice offers many varieties of rice including white rice, parboiled rice, whole grain brown rice, organic rice, yellow rice, wild rice, basmati rice and jasmine rice. Most of Carolina Rice's US-grown rice is sourced from Arkansas, California, Florida, Louisiana, Missouri, Mississippi, and Texas. Riviana Foods commercializes other rice varieties that are originally grown in Thailand (jasmine rice) and India (basmati rice). It has no connection to the variety of rice called Carolina Gold.

=== Mahatma Rice ===
Riviana Foods introduced Mahatma Rice to the United States in 1932, during the Great Depression. Mahatma Rice is a national rice brand, serving all of the domestic United States, while its sister brand Carolina Rice covers northeast distribution from Maine to Washington, D.C. Mahatma Rice offers many varieties of rice, including white rice, parboiled rice, whole grain brown rice, Valencia short grain rice, organic rice, yellow rice, wild rice, basmati rice and jasmine rice. Most of Mahatma Rice's US-grown rice is sourced from Arkansas, California, Florida, Louisiana, Missouri, Mississippi, and Texas. Riviana Foods commercializes other rice varieties that are originally grown in Thailand (jasmine rice) and India (basmati rice). The rice's mascot was removed from packages in 2020 as it was considered a racist stereotype.

=== Minute Rice ===
Minute Rice was founded in 1941. It started as a patented method for precooking and dehydrating rice before being used by the U.S. Armed Forces for G.I. rations during World War II. Minute Rice was eventually introduced to the greater population in 1946 and gained worldwide distribution in 1949. The brand first introduced precooked, parboiled white rice then expanded its product line to brown rice in 1990. Riviana Foods Inc. acquired Minute Rice in 2006 from Kraft Foods. The brand expanded its product line significantly in 2008 when it launched ready-to-serve rice cups, an easy staple food that could be stored in pantries and microwaved when needed. Today, Minute Rice sells boxed instant rice and rice cups in many rice varieties, and quinoa.

=== Success Rice ===
Riviana Foods Inc. introduced Success Rice in 1977, its rice brand offering parboiled, boil-in-bag rice. The brand's product line includes four varieties of boil-in-bag rice, including white rice, basmati rice, jasmine rice, and brown rice. Boil-in-bag rice is made by parboiling rice after it is harvested. In 2017, Success Rice released boil-in-bag tri-color quinoa.

=== Adolphus Rice ===
Adolphus Rice first came to market in 1938 in Houston, TX. Adolphus rice is grown in Texas. It offers whole grain brown rice, gold parboiled rice, and long grain white rice and is sold in Texas.

=== Blue Ribbon Rice ===
Blue Ribbon Rice is grown in the US and kosher certified. Blue Ribbon offers three varieties of rice: whole grain brown rice, golden parboiled rice and white rice. Originally purchased by American Rice, Inc. in 1975, Blue Ribbon Rice was acquired by Riviana Foods Inc. when American Rice, Inc. was purchased from Grupo SOS in 2011.

=== Colusa Rose Rice ===
Colusa Rose Rice offers Calrose rice, a variety of rice that originates from California.

=== Comet Rice ===
Founded in 1902, Comet Rice offers many varieties of rice, such as long grain white rice, whole grain rice and parboiled rice. Comet Rice is a sister company of Wonder rice. Its rice is grown in the USA. Originally part of American Rice, Inc., Comet Rice was acquired by Riviana Foods Inc. in 2011 when Riviana purchased American Rice, Inc. from Grupo SOS.

=== Gourmet House ===
Gourmet House rice offers three varieties of wild rice: cracked, cultivated and quick cooking, all of which are grown in the USA. It was acquired by Riviana Foods in 1999 from Anheuser-Busch.

=== Pear Blossom ===
Pear Blossom offers Calrose rice, a variety that originate from California. Pear Blossom rice is similar to sticky rice and recommended for use in Japanese or Korean cooking.

=== RiceSelect ===
Riviana Foods purchased RiceSelect from RiceTec in 2015. RiceSelect was the consumer business of RiceTec at the time. RiceSelect offers rice, quinoa and pasta. One of its products is Texmati rice, which RiceSelect claims was the first aromatic rice to be introduced in the USA resembling basmati rice. The rice variety was called Texmati because it was grown in Texas.

=== River Rice ===
River Rice is a sister company of Water Maid rice. Its rice is grown in the USA. Its products include medium grain white rice and whole grain brown rice. Both are kosher certified.

=== Sello Rojo ===
Introduced in Puerto Rico in 1926, Sello Rojo rice offers short grain rice. Its rice is harvested in California.

=== Tilda Rice ===
Tilda Rice was founded in 1970 before originally purchased in 2014 by US group Hain Celestial. Hain Celestial Group sold the company to Ebro Foods in August 2019.

=== Water Maid ===
Water Maid rice is a sister company of River Rice. Its rice is grown in the USA. It offers one product, the Water Maid medium grain white rice.

=== Wonder ===
Wonder brand rice is a sister company of Comet Rice. Its rice is grown in the US and is kosher certified. It offers one product, the Wonder long grain enriched rice.

== Riviana Foods pasta brands and products ==
=== Ronzoni ===
Ronzoni was founded in 1918 as the Ronzoni Macaroni Company. By the 1970s, Ronzoni was the number one pasta in New York. In 1990, Ronzoni was acquired by the Hershey Food Corporation. Ronzoni pasta was then acquired by New World Pasta, which in turn was acquired by Ebro Foods S.A. in 2006. Ronzoni products include classic pasta and innovations like Turmeric pasta and SuperGreens pasta (vegetable pasta).

On March 29, 2021, 8th Avenue Food & Provisions, a subsidiary of Post Holdings, announced that it was acquiring Rozoni from Ebro for $95 million. The acquisition was expected to be completed in the second quarter of 2021, pending regulatory approval.

=== American Beauty ===
American Beauty was founded in 1916 after the Kansas City Macaroni and Importing Co. merged with the Denver Macaroni Company. It appears to be a sister company of Ronzoni pasta. Similar to Ronzoni pasta, American Beauty offers several product lines, including classic pasta, gluten free pasta, SuperGreens pasta (vegetable pasta) and Thick & Hearty pasta. It was acquired by Hershey Foods Corporation in 1984 before being sold to New World Pasta, which in turn was acquired by Ebro Foods S.A. in 2006.

=== No Yolks ===
No Yolks was introduced in 1976. It was first developed as a no-cholesterol egg noodle, made only with wheat flour, corn flour and egg whites. In 2011, No Yolks was purchased by New World Pasta as part of an acquisition of Strom Products, which also included another Riviana brand, Wacky Mac. In 2017, when New World Pasta, American Rice, Inc. and Riviana Foods Inc. merged, No Yolks became part of Riviana Foods.

=== Skinner ===
Skinner was founded in Omaha, NE in 1911. In 1979, Hershey Foods Corporation acquired Skinner, which was eventually sold to New World Pasta and folded into Riviana Foods Inc. Skinner is distributed in the southeast United States. It sells a Texas-shaped pasta.

=== Creamette ===
The macaroni, called Creamette, was introduced in 1912 as a new macaroni noodle that had a thinner wall and larger hole. It was manufactured by Minnesota Macaroni Company. Creamette is distributed in 37 states in the United States. Creamette was originally sold to the Borden Company in 1979 before becoming a brand owned by Riviana Foods Inc.

=== Light 'n Fluffy ===
Light 'n Fluffy is a pasta brand that specializes in egg noodles. It became a brand owned by Riviana Foods Inc. after the merger with New World Pasta in 2017.

=== Mrs. Weiss' ===
Mrs. Weiss' is a pasta brand that specializes in European Hungarian and Ukrainian egg noodles.

=== Prince ===
Prince Spaghetti pasta was founded in 1912 when three Sicilian immigrants opened a small pasta shop in the North End of Boston, MA at 92 Prince Street. By 1941, Prince pasta relocated to Lowell, MA. In 1987, Prince pasta was sold to Borden Inc., which was eventually acquired by New World Pasta in 2001. It became one of Riviana Foods Inc.'s brands in 2017 when Riviana merged with New World Pasta.

=== San Giorgio ===
In 1914, the Keystone Macaroni Company in Lebanon, PA was renamed San Giorgio. By 1950, San Giorgio went from producing 100 pounds of pasta a day to 400,000 pounds per week. Hershey Foods Corporation acquired San Giorgio in 1966. After Hershey Foods Corp. sold its dry pasta business to New World Pasta in 1998 and New World Pasta merged with Riviana Foods Inc. in 2017, San Giorgio became one of Riviana Food Inc.'s brands.

=== Wacky Mac ===
Wacky Mac was created in 1976 as a multi-shaped, tri-colored pasta meant to be used in salads and casseroles. Because of its popularity with kids, a kid-friendly boxed macaroni and cheese called Wacky Mac Macaroni and Cheese Dinner was developed. In 2011, New World Pasta bought Wacky Mac as a part of an acquisition of Strom Products, which also included another Riviana brand, No Yolks. In 2017, when New World Pasta, American Rice, Inc. and Riviana Foods Inc. merged, Wacky Mac joined Riviana Foods Inc.

== Financial activity ==
The company's shares are listed on the Bolsa de Madrid.
