= Mrs. Grass =

Brand of instant soups and noodle soups

- Formerly: I.J. Grass Noodle Company
- Type: Private (1915–86)
- Industry: Food
- Founded: 1915; 111 years ago
- Founder: Sophie Dreifuss
- Fate: Acquired by Borden in 1986, then other owners, became a brand
- Headquarters: Chicago, U.S.
- Products: Instant soups, noodle soups
- Owner: Kraft Heinz
- Parent: Borden (1986–2001); Heinz (2001–pres.)
- Website: wylers.com/gdetails

Mrs. Grass is a food brand used on instant soups, and noodle soups, currently commercialised through the Wyler's brand, from the Kraft Heinz brand portfolio. The former Mrs. Grass company had been born as a family business in Chicago in 1915, operating independently until 1986.

== History ==
Founder "Mrs. Grass" was born Sophie Dreifuss, in Baden, Germany. She married I.J. (Isaac Jerome) Grass and lived in Chicago, Illinois, on the city's south side. She and her husband opened a delicatessen in 1901 and lived above the store. Her noodle soup sold so well from the delicatessen that they opened their own noodle factory, the "I.J. Grass Noodle Company" at 6027 Wentworth Ave, in 1915. In 1939, developments in food dehydration allowed the company to create a dried noodle soup mix. Between 1917 and 1925 they expanded to three locations, and by the 1960s, I.J. Grass Noodle Company was a multi-million dollar company.

Sophie and Isaac had two sons, A. Irving Grass and Sidney Grass. Irving became president of the company, and Sidney became vice president and secretary.

During the 1950s, Mrs. Grass sponsored a Saturday morning children's radio program, featuring the space travel adventures of the hero "Super Noodle". Mrs. Grass was acquired by Borden in 1986. When Borden sold its food division in 2001, the soup was acquired by Heinz and noodles was acquired by American Italian Pasta Company.

Isaac Jerome Grass died in October 1925. Sophie Grass died in 1953 at the age of 74.

== The magic egg (egg nugget) ==
Mrs. Grass soup was unique with its inclusion of a self-contained 'magic egg', which Wyler's called the Golden Flavor Nugget. The Golden Flavor Nugget dissolved as it boiled, releasing oils and chicken bouillon into the water.

To the dismay of many Mrs. Grass soup eaters, the "magic egg" was discontinued sometime around February 2016.
