= Borden's Ice Cream =

Coordinates: 30°13′13″N 92°1′1″W

Borden's Ice Cream Shoppe
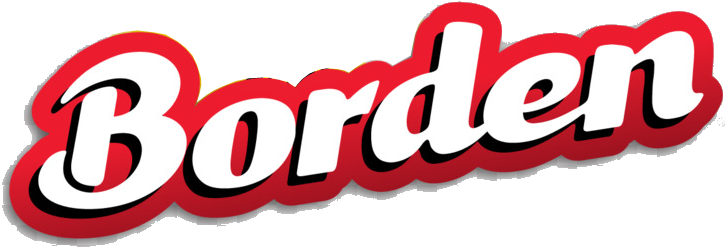

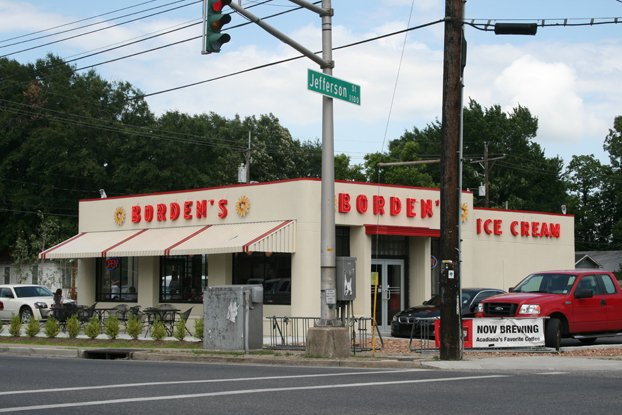
- The building pictured in 2010

General information
- Type: Ice cream parlor
- Location: Johnston Street, Lafayette, Louisiana, United States
- Opened: 1940; 86 years ago
- Owner: Lerille Family

Website
- bordensicecreamshoppe.com

Borden's Ice Cream Shoppe is a historic ice cream parlor on Johnston Street in Lafayette, Louisiana, built in 1940 to sell Borden ice creams. In 1981, then owner, lifelong Lafayette resident Flora Levy, died. Her will stipulated a large bequest, including the ice cream parlor, to the University of Louisiana Lafayette's Foundation. The Foundation held the title to the building and rented the space to the manager who continued to operate the business. The building had been passed down from generation to generation in the Levy family; Flora had received it from her mother.

In May 2009, the Foundation sold the store to Red's Health Club owner Red Lerille, who bought the property with the intention of keeping the local icon alive in Lafayette. Lerille plans to slightly renovate the building, adding a drive through window and outdoor seating. Lerille's daughter Kackie Lerille will manage the store. Lerille was quoted as saying that he is interested in mom-and-pop type businesses like the ice cream store. "I believe it is the American way, but it is dying fast. This location is actually the last Borden’s retail ice cream shop in the United States. It is a Lafayette tradition and my daughter and I fully intend to bring it back to its original state." Ella Mae Meaux—who had worked in the parlor for 48 years by the time it was sold to the Lerille Family—said, "Generations of family have come to Borden's for the old-fashioned ice cream parlor experience. This sale to the Lerilles ensures families will be able to continue with this experience for many years to come."

== Business management ==
Borden's had been run by General Manager Wayne Tucker. The business had rented the building from the ULL Foundation, with the rent being used to fund the annual Flora Levy Lecture Series at the University. The proceeds from the sale of the building will also be placed in a trust to continue the aforementioned lecture series.
