= C.F. Mueller Company =

American pasta manufacturer

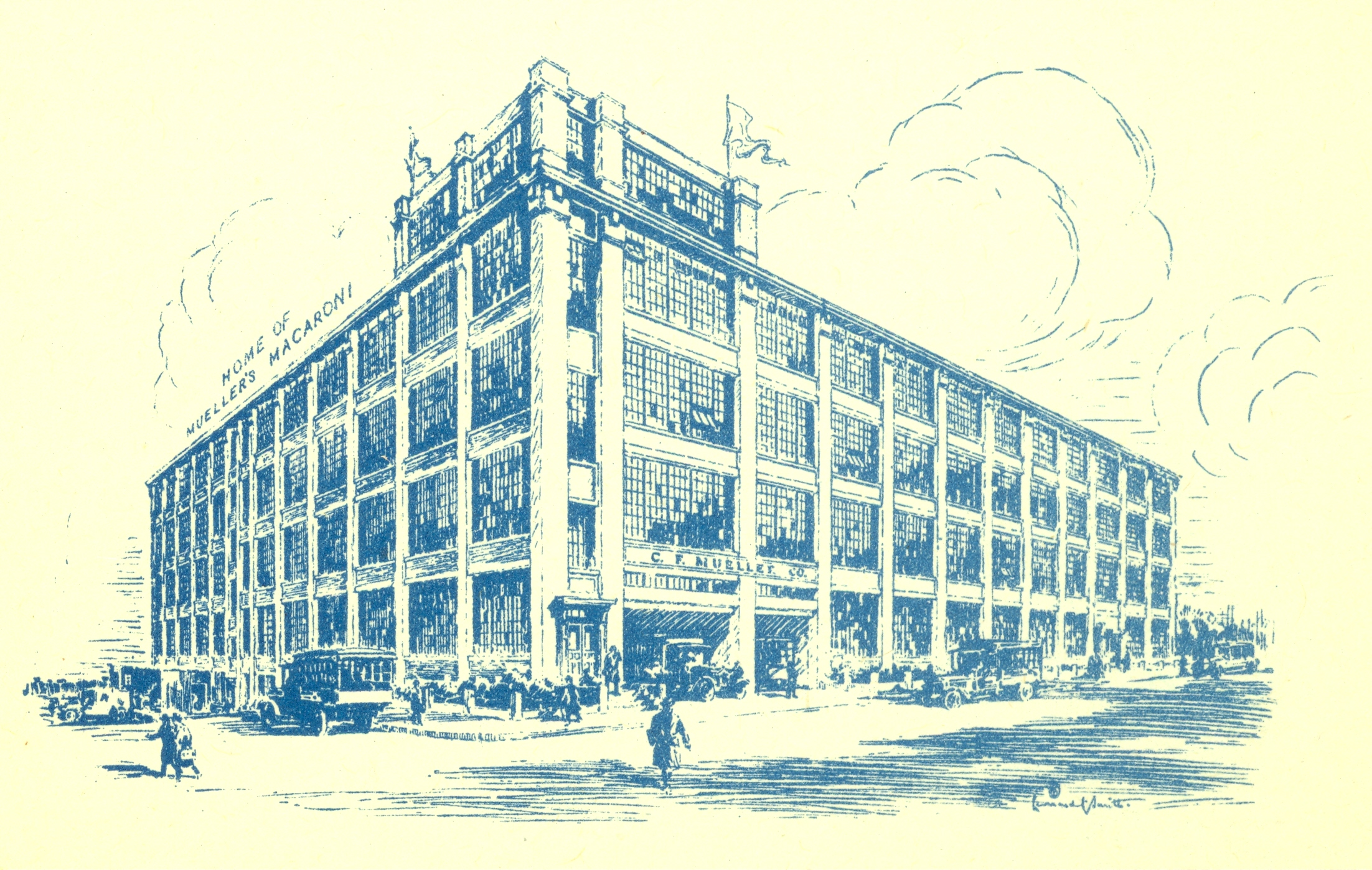
- Mueller's Macaroni Factory
- Industry: Food Manufacturing
- Founded: 1867; 159 years ago
- Founder: Christian F. Mueller
- Headquarters: Jersey City, United States
- Products: Pasta
- Parent: Winland Foods
- Website: muellerspasta.com

The C.F. Mueller Company was founded in 1867 and built one of the biggest and most-advanced pasta factories in the United States at 180 Baldwin Avenue in Jersey City, New Jersey. At one time, Mueller's Macaroni became the largest selling brand of pasta in America. It is owned by Investindustrial Winland Foods.

From 1947 to 1976, Mueller was owned by the New York University School of Law; McKesson bought the C.F. Mueller Company in 1977; CPC International bought Mueller from McKesson in 1983.

CPC spun off its food division as Bestfoods in 1997; Unilever acquired Bestfoods in 2000. Mueller's was among the brands divested afterward, being sold to American Italian Pasta Company. American Italian Pasta Company was acquired by Ralcorp in 2010, which in turn was acquired by ConAgra Foods in 2013 and again to TreeHouse Foods in 2016. TreeHouse Foods divested the pasta business in October of 2022, with the new company called Winland Foods.
