= Guys Snack Foods =

American food company

Guy's Snack Foods is a snack foods manufacturer and distributor based in Kansas City, Kansas, with its target market being the Midwest.

It is the first company to sell barbecue-flavored potato chips. The company's biggest product line is its potato chips, but it also offers cheese puffs, tortilla chips, snack mix and pretzels.

The company was founded by Guy and Frances Caldwell in 1938 as "Guy's Nut and Candy Company", so named because it sold roasted peanuts throughout the Kansas City area.

At one time the company had 1,000 employees in its Liberty, Missouri plant. It was sold to Borden Food Corporation in 1979. Borden sold it in 1994. It went into bankruptcy in 2001.

It emerged from bankruptcy and is now based in Kansas. It was later acquired by entrepreneur Andrew Miller in 2018.
