= Eagle Foods =

American food manufacturer

Eagle Family Foods Group LLC
- Type: Private
- Industry: Food
- Founded: December 2015; 10 years ago
- Headquarters: Cleveland, Ohio, United States.
- Products: Condensed and evaporated milk, popcorn, french fries, sweet onion sticks
- Brands: List: Eagle Brand; Cretors; Fry Masters; Hamburger Helper; Magnolia; Milnot; Monster Pop; PET; Popcorn; Skinny Sticks; Suddenly Salad
- Owner: Kelso & Company
- Website: eaglefoods.com

Eagle Family Foods Group LLC, doing business as Eagle Foods, is an American food company based in Cleveland, Ohio owned by private equity firm Kelso & Company. The company was founded in 2015 by Paul Smucker Wagstaff, formerly of The J.M. Smucker Company, after acquiring ownership of the canned milk brands formerly owned by Borden Inc. (Eagle Brand, Magnolia, Milnot, and PET).

Eagle Family Foods' product line includes condensed and evaporated milk, popcorn, french fries, sweet onion sticks, and pasta dishes.

== History ==
Gail Borden introduced the Eagle Brand in 1856 to develop a refrigeration and food preservation system, with its condensed milk as the flagship of the company. He established his own company, Borden, Inc. in 1857. In 1874, Eagle Brand became the first registered trademark in the then-British colony of Hong Kong. In East Asian markets excluding South Korea, Eagle Brand products are produced by Nestlé, a Swiss company.

The J.M. Smucker Company bought the canned milk business from Borden in 2007. Eagle Family Foods Group LLC was established after Paul Smucker Wagstaff left The J. M. Smucker Company in 2014 to carry on his own enterprise. Wagstaff partnered with his friend Jeff Boyle to acquire Eagle Brand from The J. M. Smucker Company. A private equity firm, Kelso & Company negotiated the transaction and became their investment partner. Eagle Foods was established in December 2015. In August 2016, Eagle Foods acquired the popcorn brand G.H. Cretors, derived from the Chicago-based manufacturing company Cretors established in 1885.

On July 5, 2022, Eagle Foods acquired the Hamburger Helper and Suddenly Salad brands from General Mills for $610 million.

== Products and brands ==
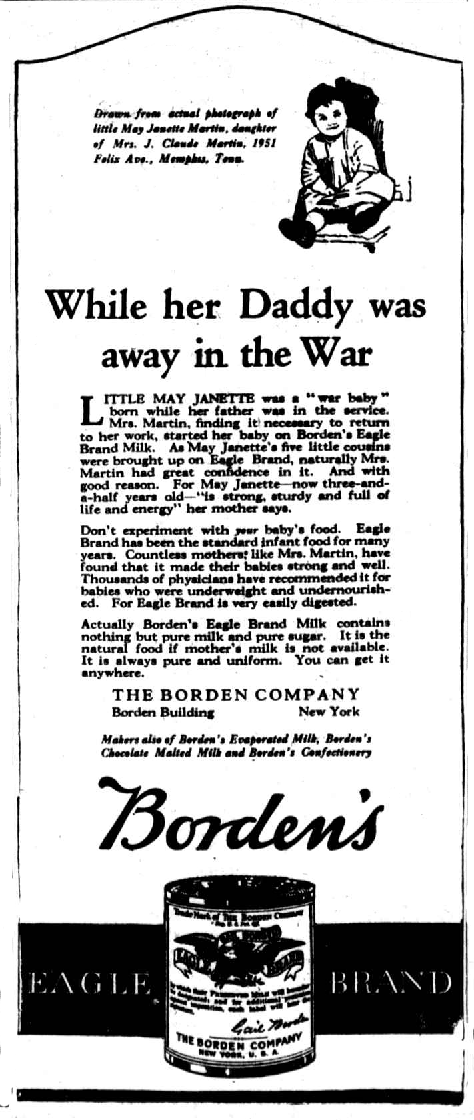
Newspaper ad for Eagle Brand milk from 1922, describing how the child grew up drinking the milk while her father was away in World War I

- Condensed milk: Eagle Brand, Magnolia
- Evaporated milk: Magnolia, Milnot, PET
- Popcorn: Cretors, Monster Pop!, Popcorn Indiana
- French fries: Fry Masters
- Snacks: Skinny Sticks
- Pasta dishes: Hamburger Helper, Suddenly Salad

== Facilities ==
- El Paso, Texas – evaporated and condensed milk
- Seneca, Missouri – evaporated and condensed milk

Closed facilities These facilities produced Eagle Brand products under Borden Milk:

- Ingersoll, Ontario – Ingersoll Dairy originally supplied Borden's Eagle Brand Condensed Milk
- Toronto – supplied Borden's Eagle Brand Condensed Milk in Ontario
- Montreal – supplied Borden's Eagle Brand Condensed Milk in Canada
- Chester, South Carolina – supplied Cremora and Cremora Royale worldwide (except to South Africa)

== See also ==
- Borden Inc., original company
- Borden Dairy, revived company (2009–present)
- Carnation (brand)
