= Borden Milk Plant =

- Borden Powdered Milk Plant
- U.S. National Register of Historic Places
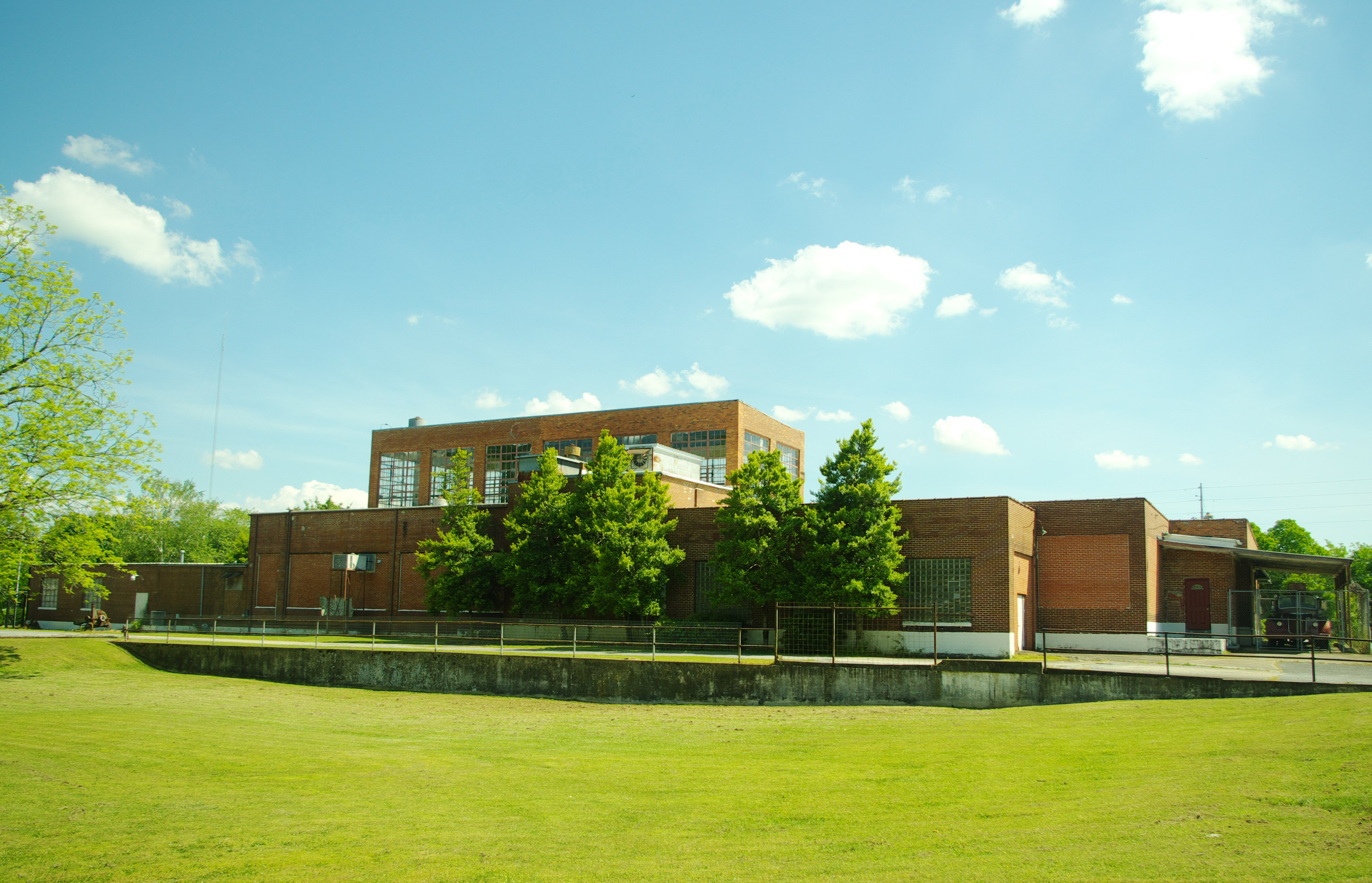

- Location within Tennessee Location within the United States
- Location: S. Main St., Fayetteville, Tennessee
- Coordinates: 35°8′8″N 88°33′21″W
- Area: 1.8 acres (0.73 ha)
- Built: 1927
- NRHP reference No.: 88001060
- Added to NRHP: July 14, 1988

The Borden Milk Plant, now the home of the Fayetteville-Lincoln County Museum, is a historic dairy processing plant in Fayetteville, Tennessee.

== History ==
The Borden Milk Plant was built by the Borden Company in 1927 to process raw milk into butter and powdered milk. It was among the earliest industrial facilities to be established by a major U.S. company in the former Confederacy in the years after the American Civil War.

The facility was important to the economy of Lincoln County and the surrounding region, particularly during the Great Depression, when it provided the only source of cash income for the area's farmers. In its first month of business, it paid $25,000 to the farmers who supplied raw milk. At its peak of operation, it had 75 employees and obtained milk from over 1,200 dairy farmers in the area. Local hog farmers used whey from the plant (a byproduct of milk processing) as a supplementary feed for their hogs.

In its later years, the plant produced cottage cheese from skimmed milk. During World War II, it supplied dried eggs and dried milk to the U.S. military.

The milk processing plant closed in 1962. In 1988 the facility was listed on the National Register of Historic Places as the "Borden Powdered Milk Plant".

== Museum ==
The Fayetteville-Lincoln County Museum, which is housed in the former milk plant, has 33,000 square feet (3,100 m^{2}) of exhibit space. The history of agriculture in the local area is a major focus of the museum. Other exhibits include a large collection of Native American artifacts, an electric train display, and items related to the military career of U.S. Admiral Frank Kelso, a native of Fayetteville.
