= Strom Products =

American food company

Strom Products Ltd.
- Defunct: 2012
- Fate: Acquired by New World Pasta
- Successor: New World Pasta (part of Ebro Foods)
- Headquarters: Bannockburn, Illinois, United States
- Key people: Robert B. Strom, Chairman
- Products: No Yolk noodles, Wacky Mac Pasta, Wacky Mac & Cheese
- Website: http://www.stromproducts.com/

Strom Products Ltd. was an American food manufacturer in Bannockburn, Illinois, best known for its "No Yolks" brand of cholesterol-free noodles made without egg yolks. Strom Products was acquired by Ebro Foods under its New World Pasta subsidiary in 2012.
