= Elsie the Cow =

Cartoon mascot

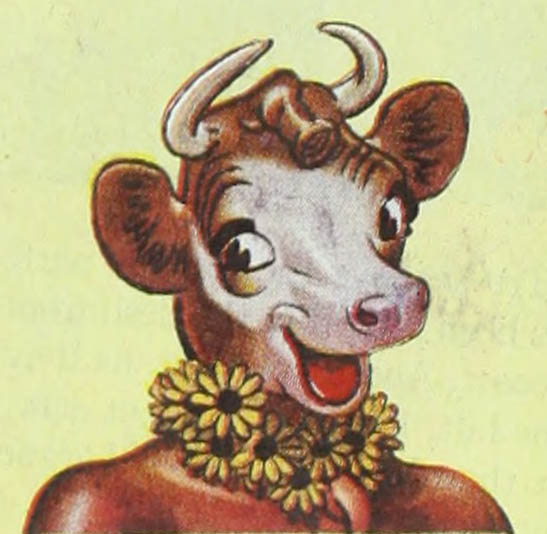
- Elsie in a 1948 ad
- First appearance: 1936; 90 years ago
- Created by: Borden, Inc.
- Based on: Cow

In-universe information
- Nationality: American

Elsie the Cow is a cartoon cow developed as a mascot for the Borden Dairy Company in 1936 to symbolize the "perfect dairy product". Despite the demise of Borden from the 1990s to 2001, the character has continued to be used in the same capacity for the company's partial successors, Eagle Family Foods (owned by J.M. Smucker) and Borden Dairy.

Named one of the Top 10 Advertising Icons of the [20th] Century by Ad Age in 2000, Elsie the Cow has been among the most recognizable product logos in the United States and Canada.

== History ==
The cartoon Elsie was created in 1936 by a team headed by advertising creative director David William Reid. Elsie first appeared as one of four cartoon cows (with Mrs. Blossom, Bessie, and Clara) in a 1936 magazine advertisement series featured in medical journals. By 1939, she was featured in her own advertisement campaign that was voted "best of the year" by the Jury of the 1939 Annual Advertising Awards.

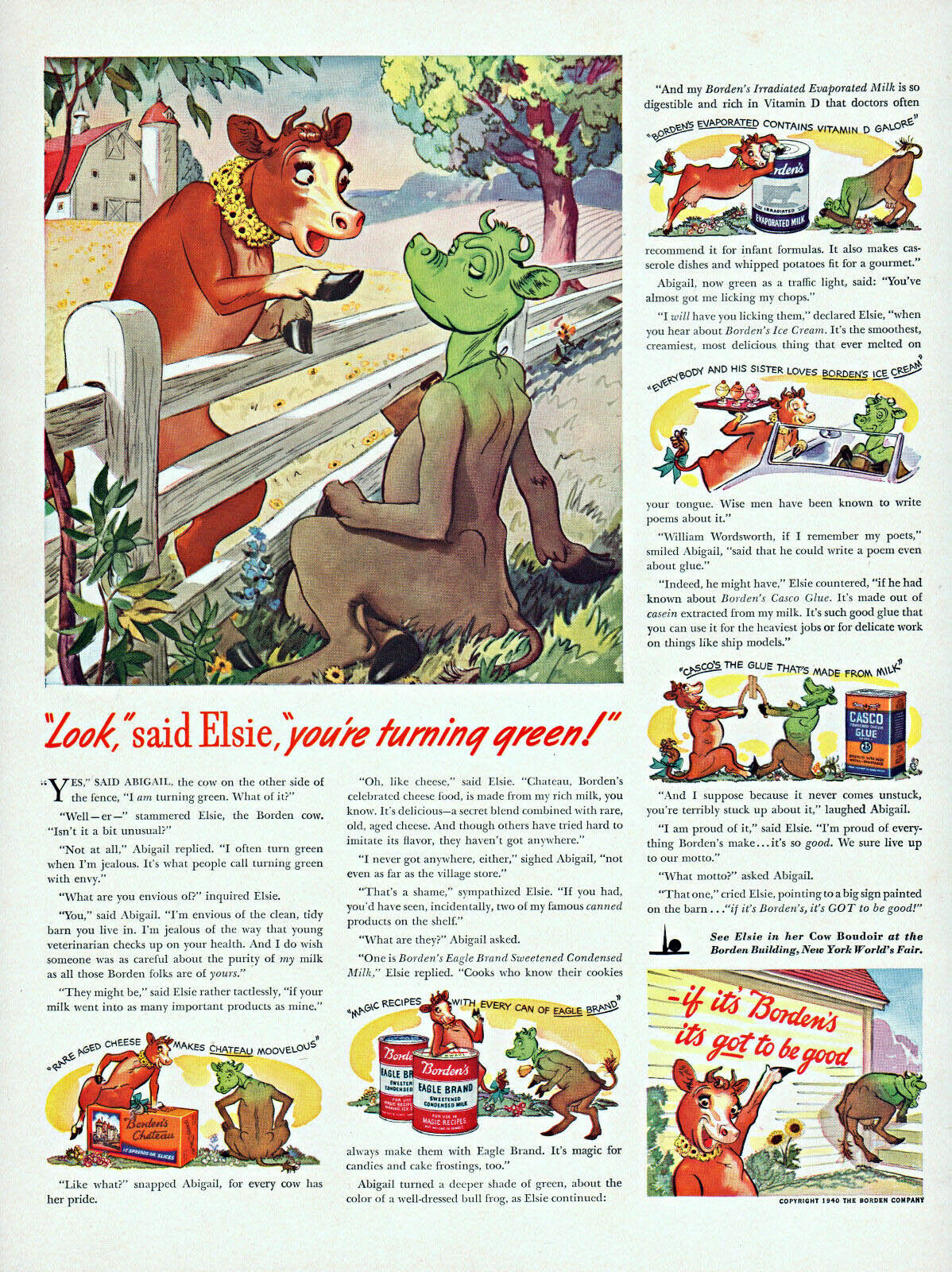
Elsie the Cow in a Borden advertisement, 1940

The first living Elsie was a registered Jersey heifer selected while participating in Borden's 1939 New York World's Fair "Rotolactor" exhibit (demonstrating the company's invention, the rotary milking parlor). The most alert cow at the demonstration, she was born at Elm Hill Farm in Brookfield, Massachusetts and named "You'll Do, Lobelia". After being purchased from her owners, family farmers from Connecticut, she spent the rest of the season on display twice each day dressed in an embroidered green blanket, and after the exhibit, she traveled around the country making public appearances. You'll Do, Lobelia is buried at her home in the Walker-Gordon Farm in Plainsboro, New Jersey. Her tomb stone is marked with the fitting title of "one of the great Elsies of our time.''

Elsie had a fictional, cartoon mate, Elmer the Bull, who was created in 1940 and lent to Borden's then chemical-division as the mascot for Elmer's Products. The pair was given teenage offspring Beulah sometime before 1947, the year baby Beauregard arrived. Twins Larabee and Lobelia appeared in 1957.

In 1940, the actual cow Elsie appeared in the film, Little Men, as "Buttercup". For a time in the mid-1940s, the cartoon Elsie was voiced by Hope Emerson. Elsie and her cartoon calves were featured in Elsie's Boudoir at Freedomland U.S.A.—an American-history theme park in the Bronx, New York—from 1960 to 1963. In the early 1950s sculptor Peter Agostini, working as the equivalent of a freelance ghostwriter, created a fresh design. A live cow representing Elsie appeared on stage at the Borden's exhibit in the Better Living Center at the 1964 New York World's Fair, in a musical revue with a score by the Broadway composer Kay Swift.

Elsie has been bestowed such tongue-in-cheek honorary university degrees as Doctor of Bovinity, Doctor of Human Kindness, and Doctor of Ecownomics. In Wisconsin, home of the Dairy Princess, Elsie was named Queen of Dairyland. The City of Bridgeport, Connecticut presented her with their P. T. Barnum Award of Showmanship.

== Living version ==
The success of the character encouraged Borden to promote a real life version of Elsie, with the name "You'll Do Lobelia", being her appearance in 1939. This version of Elsie became a well-known, being noted as "the most famous icon in the U.S.", ranking above The Campbell Soup Kids, the Marlboro Man, and The Jolly Green Giant.

Lobelia died in 1941 after a traffic accident, just two years after her rise to fame. Her tombstone is at Plainsboro, NJ. Since then, other "Elsies" took her place as Borden's spokescow.

Elsie and her bull calf son "Beauregard" made yearly appearances in the Food & Fiber Pavilion at the State Fair of Texas until retirement after their final fair in 2013.
