= Hexion =

American chemical company

Hexion Inc.
- Type: Public
- Industry: Chemical
- Predecessor: Momentive Specialty Chemicals, Borden Chemical
- Founded: 1899
- Headquarters: Columbus, Ohio
- Number of locations: ~ 66
- Key people: Michael Lefenfeld (CEO)
- Products: Chemicals
- Revenue: ~ $3.8 billion (2019)
- Number of employees: 4,300 (2017)
- Website: www.hexion.com

Hexion Inc. or Hexion (previously Momentive Specialty Chemicals) is a chemical company based in Columbus, Ohio. It produces thermoset resins and related technologies and specialty products.

Hexion is organized into two divisions: the Epoxy, Phenolic and Coating Resins Division, and the Forest Products Division.

Hexion offers resins for a wide range of applications like Abrasives, Adhesives, Chemical Intermediates, Civil Engineering, Coatings, Composites, Crop Protection, Electrical/Electronics, Engineered Wood, Fertilizers and Pesticides, Fibers and Textiles, Foams, Friction Materials, Furniture, Molding Compounds, Oilfield, Oriented Strand Board, Particleboard and Fiberboard, Plywood and Laminated Veneer Lumber and Refractories.

== Corporate structure ==
Hexion Specialty Chemicals, Inc was formed in 2005 through the merger of Borden Chemicals, Resolution Performance Products, Resolution Specialty Materials, and Bakelite AG. At that time they also acquired Pacific Epoxy Products. In 2010, the parent holding companies of Momentive Performance Materials Inc. and Hexion Specialty Chemicals Inc. merged to form Momentive Performance Materials Holdings LLC. In 2015, this combined company renamed itself to Hexion Inc.

In February 2020, Hexion Inc. announced that it has entered into a definitive agreement to sell its manufacturing site in Yumbo, Colombia to a joint venture led by Master Paints & Chemical Corporation.

== Epoxy division acquisition by Westlake ==
In February 2022, it was announced the company epoxy division acquisition by Westlake was complete.

== See also ==
- Epoxy
- Momentive
