= American Italian Pasta Company =

Pasta manufacturing company

- Type: Subsidiary
- Industry: pasta
- Founded: 1988
- Products: dry pasta
- Parent: Winland Foods
- Website: "American Italian Pasta Company (official website)". Archived from the original on 2013-08-20.

American Italian Pasta Company (AIPC) was a pasta manufacturing company with corporate offices in Kansas City, Missouri, and plants in Excelsior Springs, Missouri; Columbia, South Carolina; Tolleson, Arizona; and Verolanuova, Italy. AIPC was acquired by Ralcorp in 2010, ConAgra Foods in early 2013,TreeHouse Private Brands, Inc. in 2016 and Winland Foods in October 2022.

== Brands ==
- Anthony's (acquired 2001 from Borden)
- Mueller's (acquired 2000 from Unilever)
- Golden Grain (acquired 2003 from the Quaker Oats Company)
- Heartland
- Luxury (acquired 2001 from Borden)
- Martha Gooch (acquired 2002 from Archer Daniels Midland)
- Mrs. Grass (acquired 2001 from Borden)
- Pennsylvania Dutch (acquired 2001 from Borden)
- R&F (acquired 2001 from Borden)
- Ronco (acquired 2001 from Borden)
