= Wyler's =

American food and beverage brand

Wyler's (food)
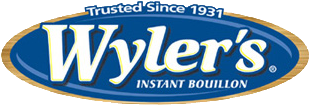
- Product type: Bouillon cube and powder, instant soup
- Current owner: Kraft Heinz
- Country: United States
- Introduced: 1931; 95 years ago
- Markets: United States
- Previous owners: Wyler's Company (1931-1961); Borden (1961-2001); H. J. Heinz Company (2001-2015)
- Tagline: "Homemade taste for the way you cook today!"

Wyler's (beverage)
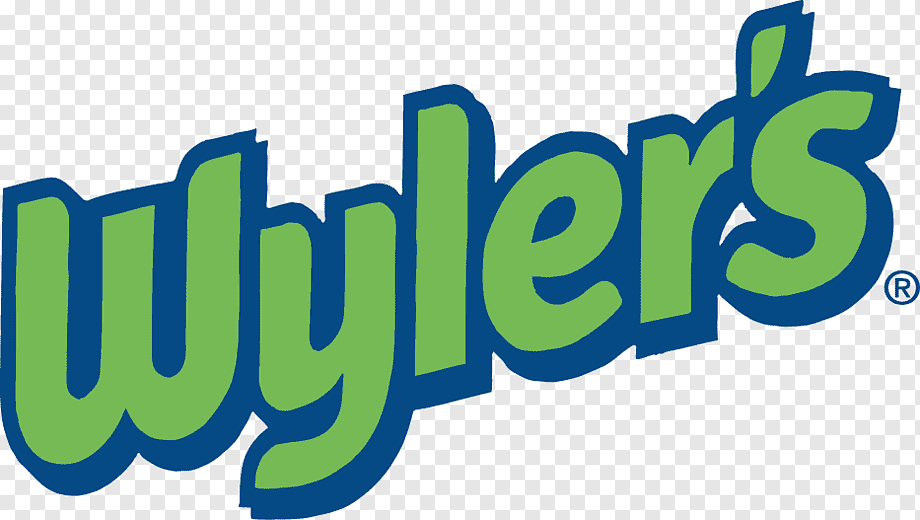
- Product type: Powdered drink mix, Italian ice
- Current owner: Jel Sert
- Country: United States
- Introduced: 1954; 72 years ago
- Markets: United States
- Previous owners: Wyler's Company (1954-1961); Borden (1961-1986); Lipton (1986-1994)
- Website: jelsert.com/collections/wylers

Wyler's is a food and beverage brand established by Wyler's Company in 1931. The brand is now owned by Kraft Heinz for bouillon and dry soup mixes and by The Jel Sert Company for powdered drink mixes.

== History ==
The spouses Silvain and Arma Wyler established Wyler's Company in 1931 selling its first product, chicken bouillon cubes. Wyler's began manufacturing bouillon cubes in Chicago in the 1940s and developed bouillon powder, dry soup mixes and powdered drink mixes in the 1950s.

Borden acquired Wyler's Company in 1961.

The Wyler's powdered drink business was sold to Lipton in 1986. Jel Sert bought the Wyler's powdered drink business from Lipton parent Unilever in 1994.

When Borden exited the food business in 2001, it sold the Wyler's bouillon and dry soup business to H. J. Heinz Company. H. J. Heinz Company would merge with Kraft Foods in 2015, creating Kraft Heinz, making Wyler's bouillon and dry soup business a sister brand to the powdered drink's primary competitor, Kool-Aid.
