= Elmer's Products =

American craft manufacturer

Elmer's Products, Inc.
- Elmer's logo used since 2007
- Type: Subsidiary
- Industry: Adhesives, stationery, craft, hardware
- Predecessor: Borden 1947–1999
- Founded: 1947; 79 years ago
- Founder: Gail Borden Jr.
- Headquarters: Westerville, Ohio, U.S.
- Area served: Worldwide
- Key people: Michael V. Warren (president & CEO); Kelli A. Bray (CFO)
- Products: Adhesives, office supplies, craft supplies, wood filler, sealants, paint markers, foam board, organizational products, cutting tools
- Number of employees: 250–500
- Parent: Newell Brands
- Website: www.elmers.com

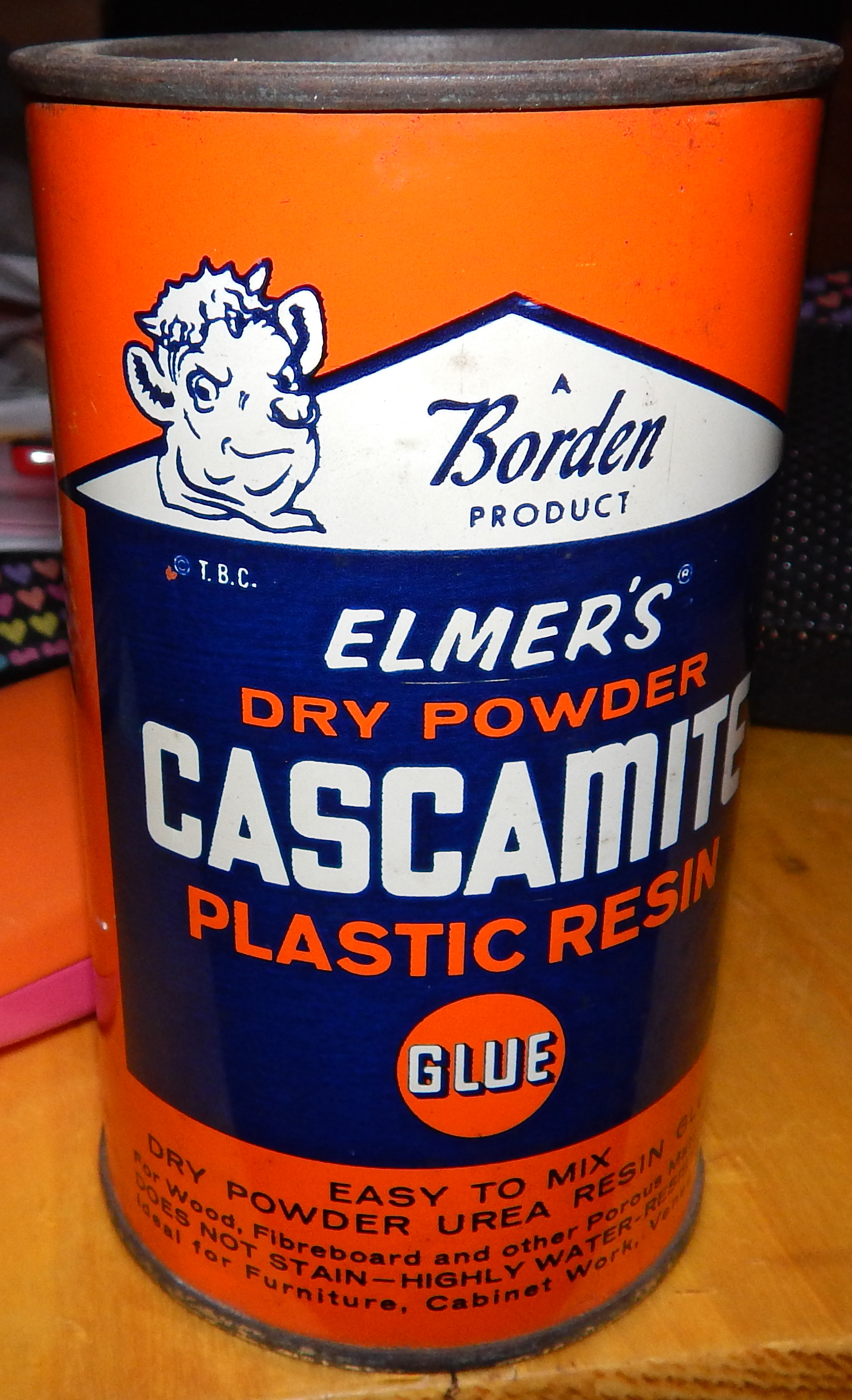
Elmer's Cascamite Glue. "Easy to mix, dry powder urea resin glue, for wood, fiberboard, and other porous materials"; it had to be mixed with water.

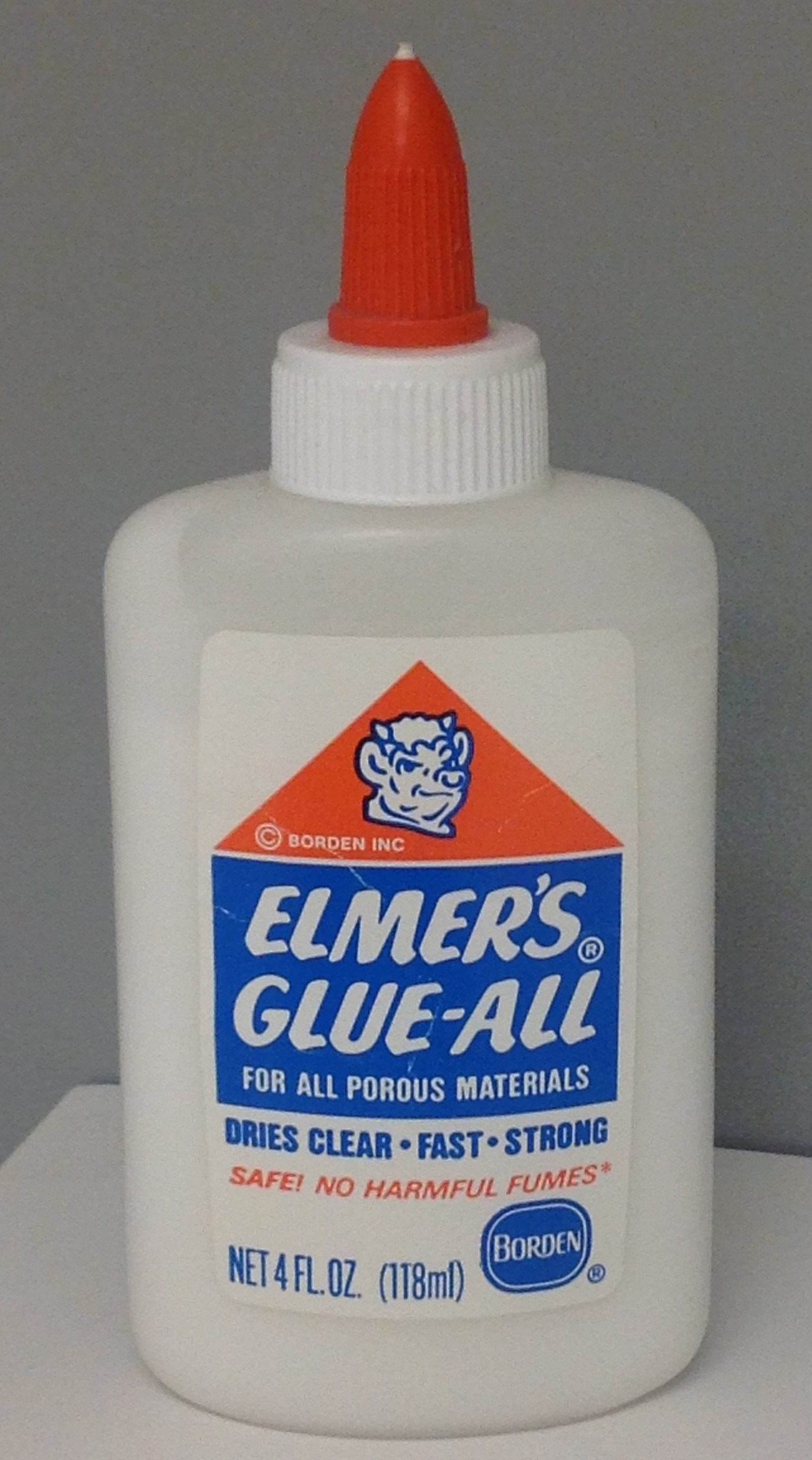
Elmer's Glue-All was introduced in 1947; packaging c. 1976.

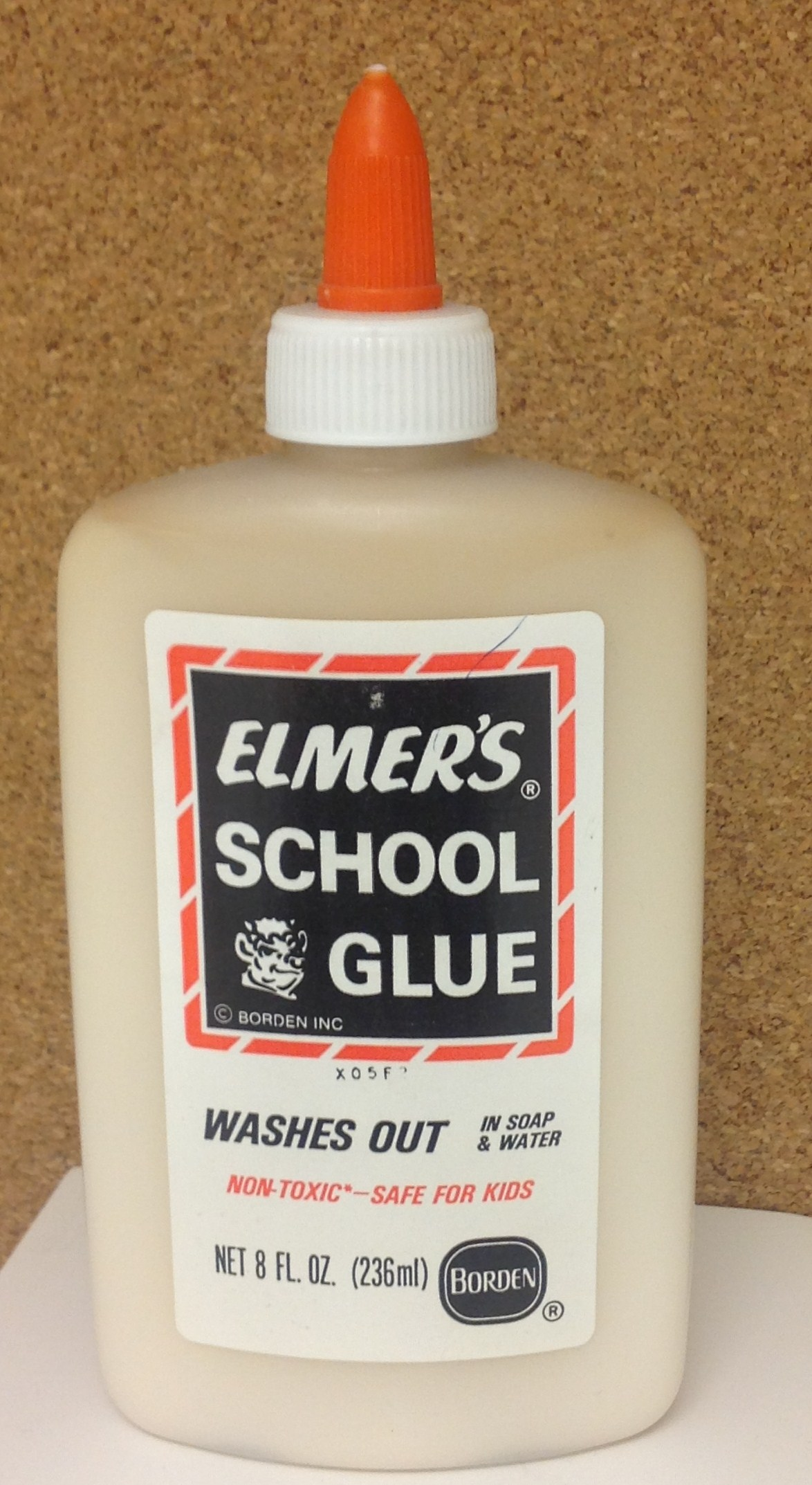
Elmer's School Glue was introduced in 1968; packaging c. 1976.

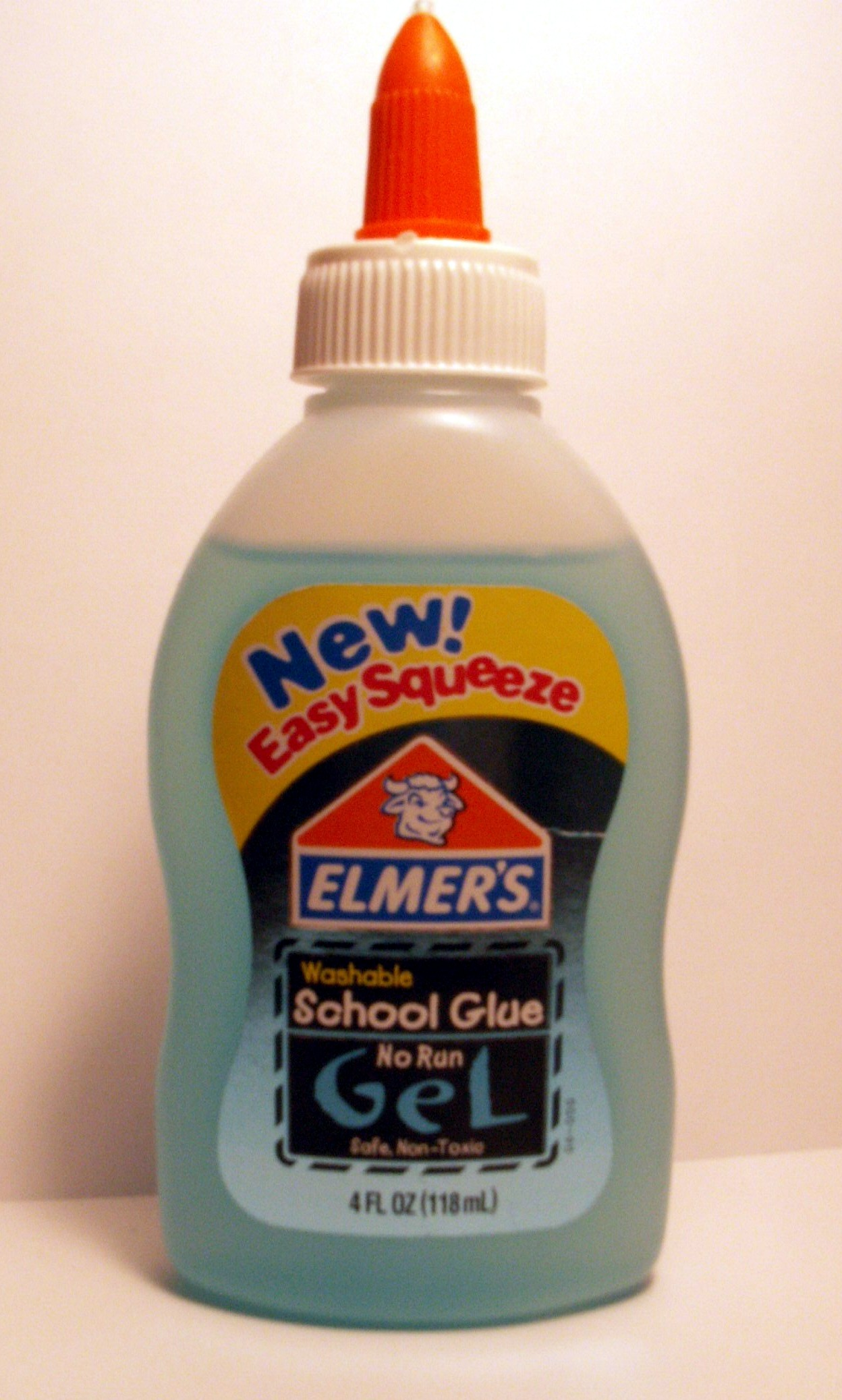
Elmer's washable, no run, School Glue

Elmer's Products, Inc. or simply Elmer's, is an American-based company that has a line of adhesive, craft, home repair, and office supply products. It is best known as the manufacturer of Elmer's Glue-All, a popular PVA-based synthetic glue, in addition to other brands including Krazy Glue, ProBond and CraftBond adhesives, and X-Acto cutting tools.

Introduced by Borden, it was spun off in 1999. The company was acquired in 2003 by Berwind Corporation, a privately held investment firm. On October 5, 2015, Newell Rubbermaid announced a $600 million deal to acquire Elmer's Products.

The logo for the brand was based upon "Elmer the Bull", mate of Borden's advertising mascot Elsie the Cow, during the 20th century. Elmer's image continues to be featured in the company logo.

== History ==
On May 11, 1857, with three employees and one product, Gail Borden founded the company that became Borden, Inc. In 1929, Borden purchased the Casein Company of America, the leading manufacturer of glues made from casein, a byproduct of milk. Borden introduced its first glue product, known as Cascorez Glue, in 1947. Five years later, the company began producing resin adhesives for use in woodworking, such as Cascamite.

=== Early years ===
Immediately after World War II, the company expanded into synthetic resin glues and, in 1947, the first multipurpose consumer white glue, known as Elmer's Glue-All, was introduced. The glue was packaged in a glass bottle with a Popsicle stick type wooden applicator attached with a rubber band. Consumer feedback confirmed a need for an easier to use delivery method, which prompted the company to develop easy to squeeze bottles featuring a twistable orange cap, introduced in 1962. This innovation remains in use and is a trademark of Elmer's Products.

=== Later years ===
Over the next few decades, Elmer's focused on expansion of adhesive products for school and home, in addition to developing a variety of hardware sealants, compounds, and caulks. In 1968, Elmer's introduced Elmer's School Glue, the first white glue that washed out of clothes. Soon, Elmer's Glue-All and School Glue would contain the same ingredients, but each retained its different packaging.

In the 1970s, Elmer's also began marketing Krazy Glue, a well-known cyanoacrylate adhesive.

In response to teacher requests for an easier-to-use, no-mess bonding method, Elmer's introduced its line of glue sticks in 1983, easing application and reducing mess.

In 1989, Borden, Inc., and Toagosei America entered into a joint venture partnership to manufacture, sell and distribute cyanoacrylate and anaerobic adhesives under the Krazy Glue and Aron Alpha trademarks.

In 1991, Elmer's expanded into the children's arts and crafts category with GluColors, colorful products designed especially for children.

In 1994, Borden was purchased by Kohlberg Kravis Roberts, and Elmer's was launched as a separate operating company. The company focused on creating category-leading adhesive and related products for school, crafts, hardware, and home repair use.

In 2000, Elmer's acquired Ross Products, an expansion that helped accelerate product development beyond adhesives and into the world of creative arts and crafts. Two years later, Elmer's was purchased by another private equity firm and merged with Hunt Corporation, known for development of adult arts and crafts, and office products, including the X-Acto and Boston brands. In addition, Painters paint markers and other arts and crafts brands were added to the family.

In 2013, Elmer's introduced "Elmer's School Glue Naturals", made primarily from plants, such as corn.

=== Let's Bond program ===
In 2013, Elmer's partnered with researcher Richard Rende, Ph.D., to explore the benefits arts and crafts can offer children in the early years of growth and development. His research revealed that creative interaction between parents and young children engaging in activities like arts and crafts not only provides immediate and lasting cognitive benefits, but also creates a unique bonding experience.

=== Elmer the Bull ===
Although Elmer the Bull did not become the marketing symbol for Borden's adhesive line until 1951, he had been a familiar household name since the 1940s. Elmer was designed in 1940 by David William Reid. Reid was part of the advertising team that developed Elsie the Cow, the well-known bovine marketing symbol for the dairy division. Elmer was a huge hit with the public and was frequently seen alongside Elsie and their children (Beulah and Beauregard created in 1948, and twins Larabee and Lobelia in 1957) in most promotional and advertising campaigns.

In 1951, Elmer the Bull was officially chosen to be the marketing symbol for all adhesives in the Borden line, and his portrait has appeared on Elmer's packaging ever since.

When first introduced in 1947 as Cascorez Glue, Elmer's glue contained casein from dairy milk. However over the second half of the 20th century, synthetic glue has become less expensive, more consistent from bottle to bottle, and lasts longer. Elmer's does not currently use animals, animal parts, or milk to make glue.

== Products ==
The company manufactures a wide range of glues, wood fillers, display boards, and paint markers, varying in strength and use.

== Other brands ==
Krazy Glue, a super-strong, fast-drying instant adhesive, was introduced to the North American market in 1973. It is based on ethyl cyanoacrylate and has properties similar to other cyanoacrylate adhesives (commonly sold as "Crazy Glue" or "Super Glue").

X-Acto is the brand name for a variety of cutting tools and office products. Cutting tools include hobby and utility knives, saws, carving tools, and many small-scale precision knives used for crafts and other applications.
