= Red Lerille =

American bodybuilder (1936–2025)

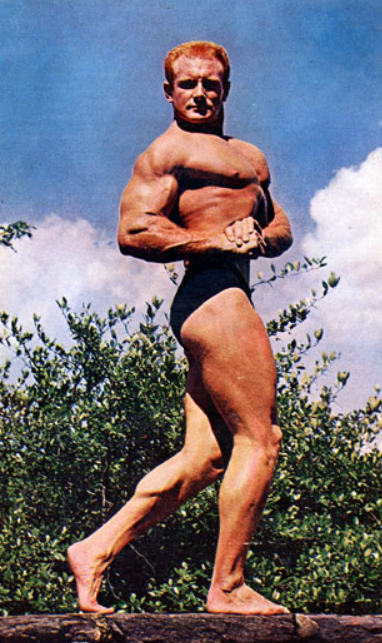
Red Lerille in Ironman magazine, 1960

Lloyd "Red" Lerille (June 9, 1936 – March 14, 2025) was an American bodybuilder. A New Orleans native, he was the winner of numerous bodybuilding titles, including Mr. New Orleans in 1955, Mr. Armed Forces and Mr. Hawaii in 1958, Mr. Dixie in 1959, and AAU Mr. America which he won in 1960. Red served in the United States Navy from 1955 to 1959. Lerille graduated from the University of Southwestern Louisiana (Now University of Louisiana Lafayette) in 1987 with a bachelor of general studies.

== Biography ==
Lerille was born on June 9, 1936. He worked at Mike Stansbury's Health Club, Inc. in Lafayette, Louisiana.

He opened his fitness club Red's in Lafayette, Louisiana, on January 13, 1963. In 1965, the club moved to its current location on Doucet Road. Lerille was a collector of high wheel bicycles and antique airplanes.

He was the recipient of the 2011 Club Industry Lifetime Achievement Award and received University of Louisiana at Lafayette Alumni Association's Outstanding Alumni Award in 2002. In 2011, he was the UL Lafayette Alumni Association's Spring Gala honoree in recognition of his community service and support of the university.

Lerille died on March 14, 2025, at the age of 88.
