= Borden (company) =

American food-product producer (1857–2001)

Borden, Inc.
- Type: Public
- Industry: Food, Glue
- Founded: 1857; 169 years ago
- Defunct: 2001
- Fate: Defunct, operations sold
- Successor: Borden Dairy; Dairy Farmers of America; Hexion
- Headquarters: Columbus, Ohio, U.S.
- Area served: Worldwide
- Products: Private label grocery products
- Brands: List: Borden's Ice Cream; Cocio; Drake's Cakes; Eagle; Mrs. Grass; ReaLemon; Wise Foods; Wyler's
- Parent: Kohlberg Kravis Roberts (1995–2001)

Borden, Inc., was an American producer of food and beverage products, consumer products, and industrial products. At one time, the company was the largest U.S. producer of dairy and pasta products. Its food division, Borden Foods, was based in Columbus, Ohio, and focused primarily on pasta and pasta sauces, bakery products, snacks, processed cheese, jams and jellies, and ice cream. It was best known for its Borden Ice Cream, Meadow Gold milk, Creamette pasta, and Borden Condensed Milk brands. Its consumer products and industrial segment marketed wallpaper, adhesives, plastics and resins. By 1993, sales of food products accounted for 67 percent of its revenue. It was also known for its Elmer's and Krazy Glue brands.

After significant financial losses in the early 1990s and a leveraged buyout by private equity firm Kohlberg Kravis Roberts (KKR) in 1995, Borden divested itself of its various divisions, brands and businesses. KKR shut Borden's food products operations in 2001 and divested all its other Borden operations in 2005. Borden dairy brands are currently used by Borden Dairy for milk and by Dairy Farmers of America for cheese.

== History ==
=== Founding ===
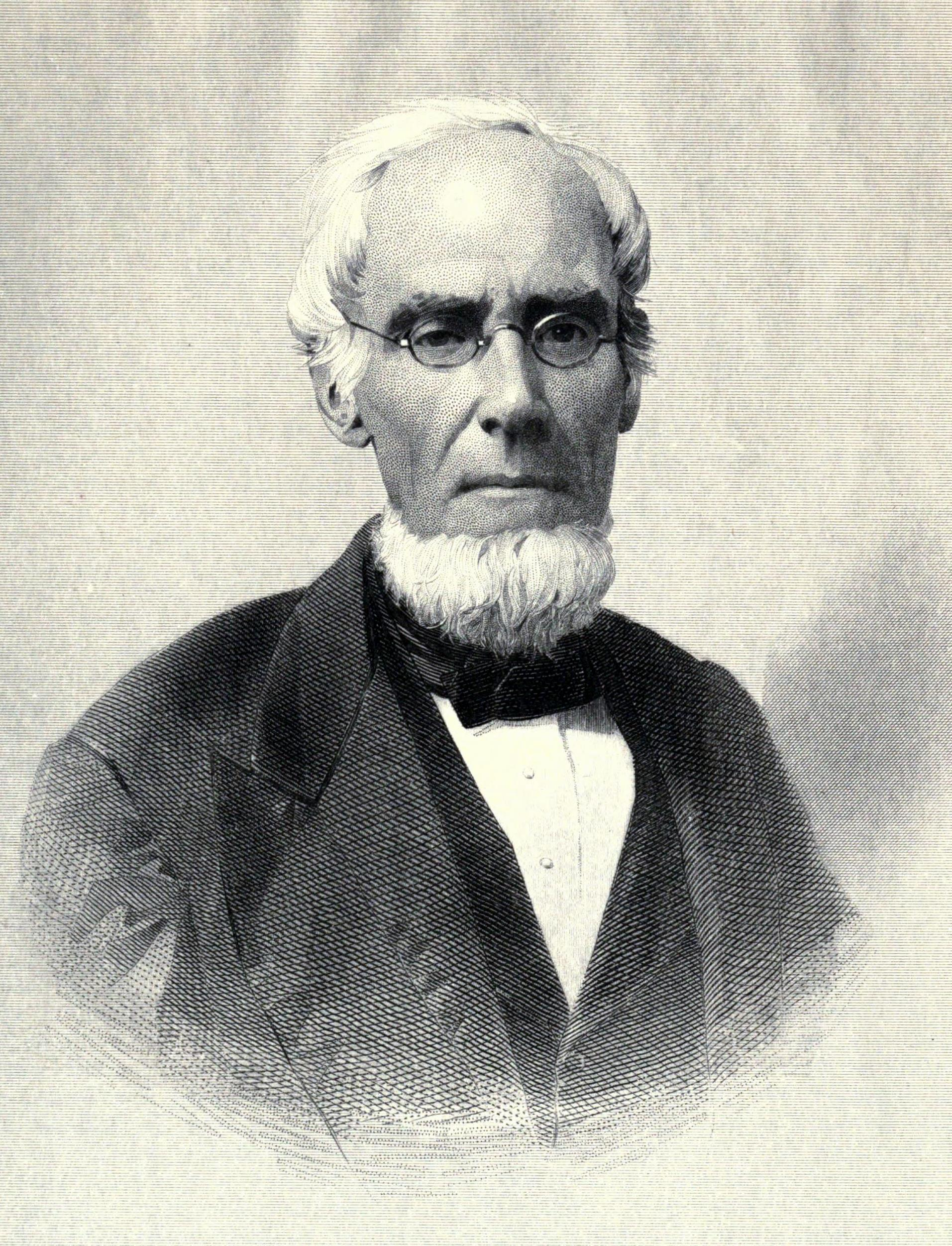
Gail Borden, founder

The company was founded by Gail Borden Jr., in 1857 in Connecticut as "Gail Borden Jr., and Company." Its primary product was condensed milk. Struggling financially, the company was saved when Jeremiah Milbank, a partner in the wholesale food distributor I. & R. Milbank & Co. and the son-in-law of banker Joseph Lake, agreed to invest and acquired 50 percent of the stock. The company changed its name in 1858 to the New York Condensed Milk Company. The company prospered during the Civil War by selling condensed milk to Union armies.

Borden began selling processed milk to consumers in 1875 and pioneered the use of glass milk bottles in 1885. Borden began selling evaporated milk in 1892, and expanded into Canada in 1895.

=== Growth ===
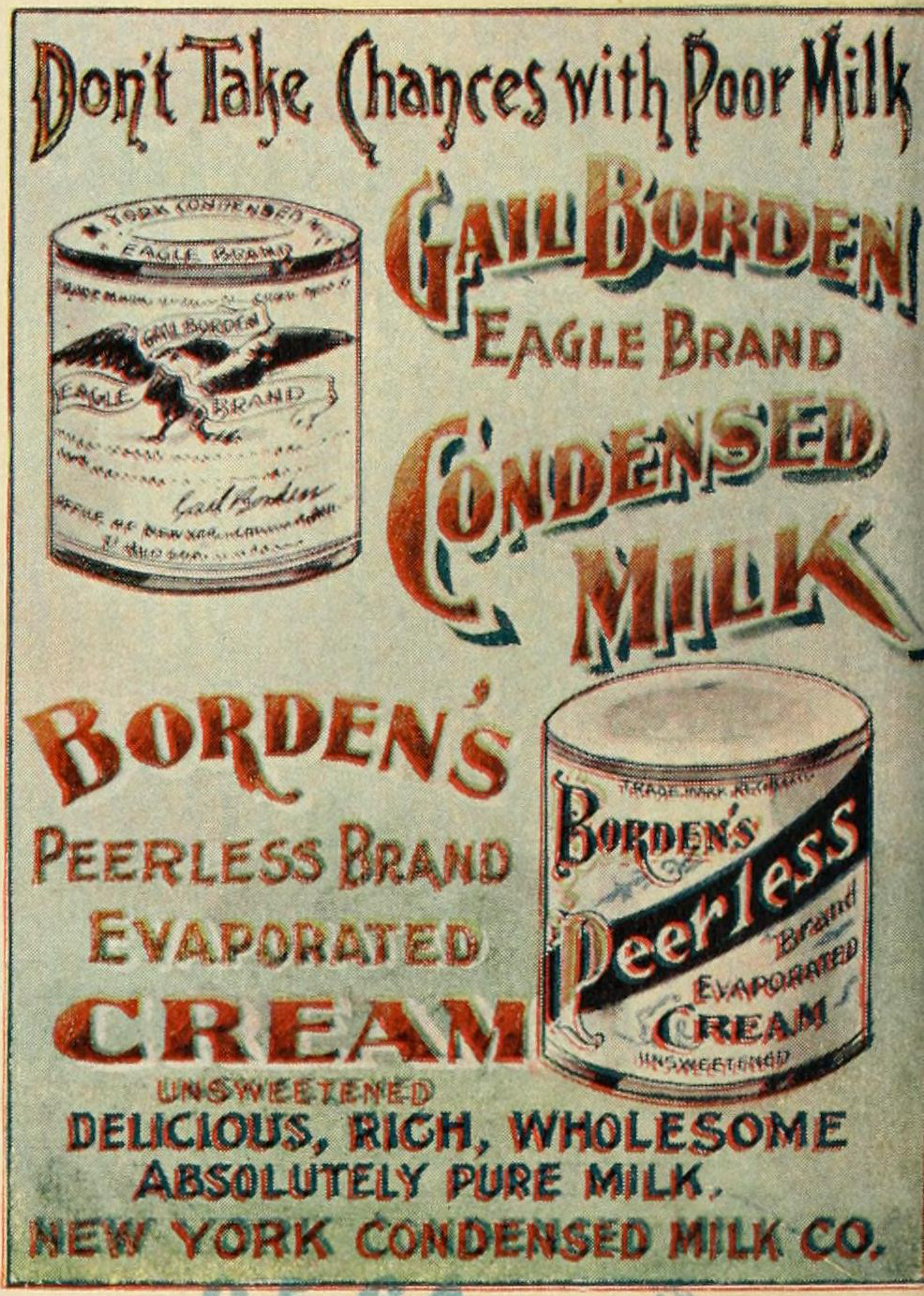
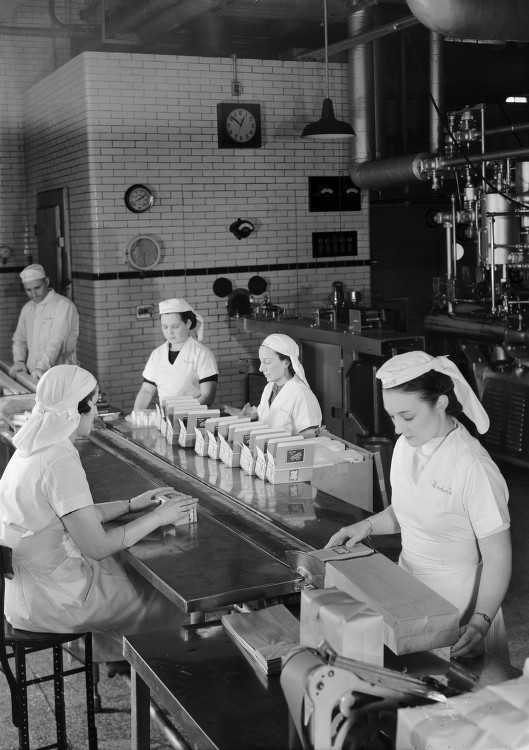
(Left): Advertisement for Borden's Eagle Brand Condensed Milk and Peerless Brand Evaporated Cream in an 1898 guidebook for travelers in the Klondike Gold Rush; (right): York Ice workers packaging product, 1938

The company changed its name to "Borden's Condensed Milk Company" in 1899. It suffered a legal setback in 1912, when a federal appellate court held that the Borden Ice Cream Co. (a competitor whose ownership included one "Charles Borden") could sell ice cream under the Borden name because Borden's Condensed Milk sold only milk, not ice cream, but the limit on its products was short-lived. It became the Borden Company in 1919 and expanded rapidly, buying numerous dairies, ice cream manufacturers, cheese producers, and mincemeat processors. Taking advantage of its many herds of cattle, the company became involved in rendering and the manufacture of adhesives. In World War II, Borden pioneered the American manufacture of non-dairy creamer, instant coffee and powdered foods.

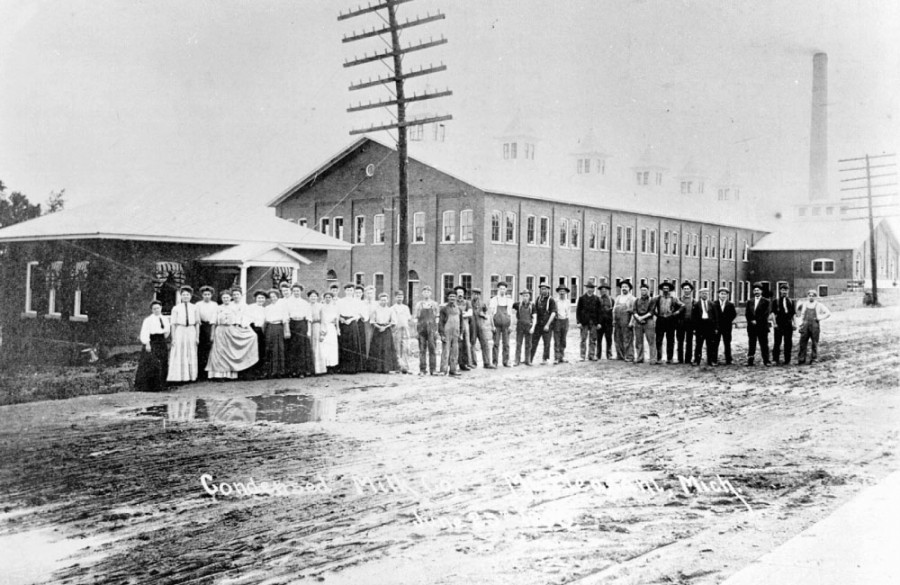
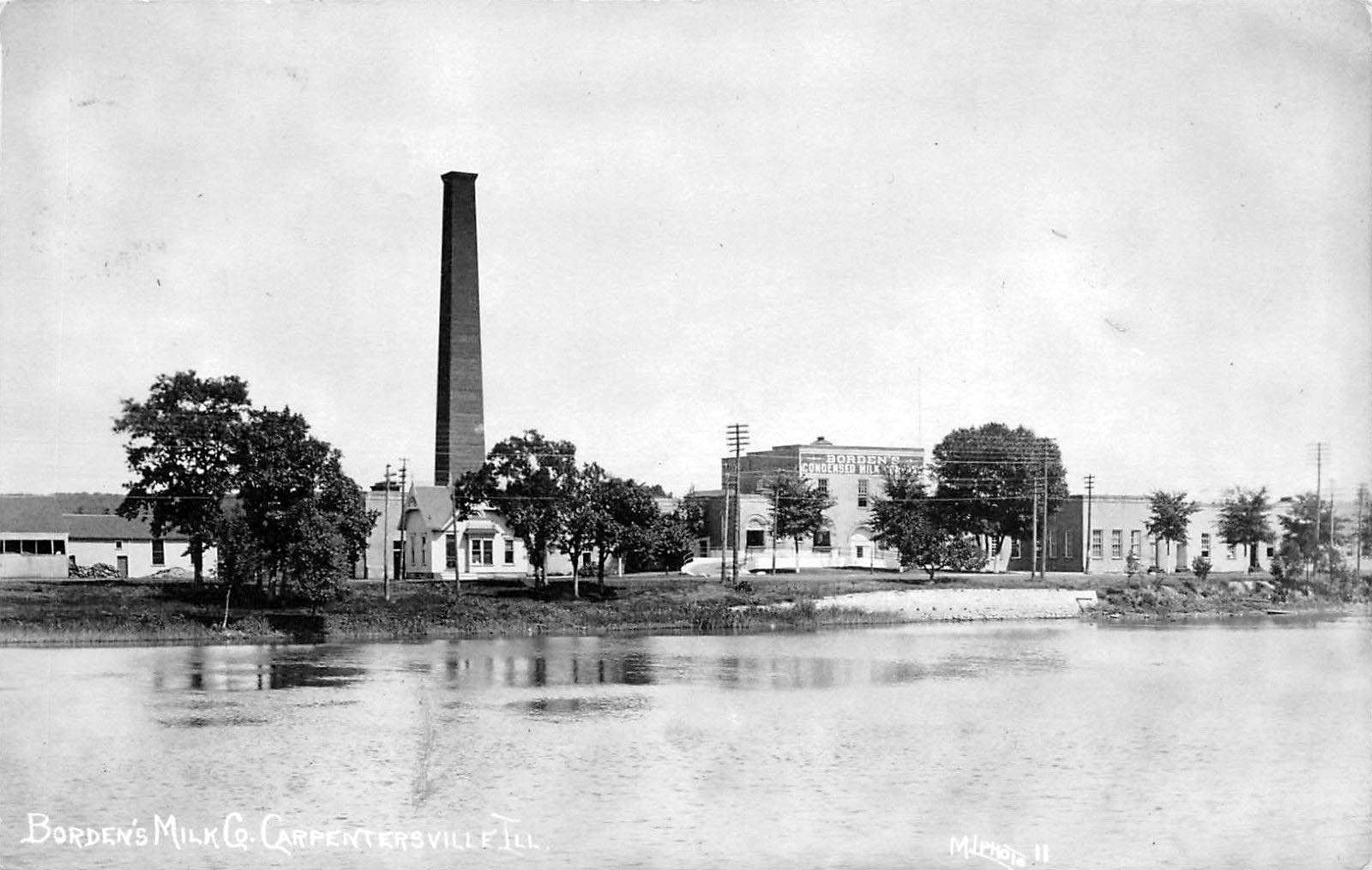
Two Borden factories in early 20th century, (left): plant and workers in Michigan, 1908; (right): plant in Illinois, 1911

In 1929, Borden was reorganized as a holding company for four separate entities: Borden's Food Products Company, Inc., Borden's Dairy Products Company, Inc., Borden's Ice Cream and Milk Company, Inc., and Borden's Cheese & Produce Company, Inc. However, in 1936 its operations were reunified, and these subsidiaries became divisions.

Borden's fictitious spokesperson, Jane Ellison, was introduced in 1929. The recipe for "Magic Lemon Cream Pie", the ancestor of the Key lime pie, is attributed to her, found in a Borden promotional brochure from 1931.

Borden and other dairy companies were investigated in 1938 for violations of the Sherman Antitrust Act, but the charges were dropped after Borden signed a consent decree in 1940.

Borden milk products in Canada began with condensed milk in Quebec and East Coast with headquarters in Montreal. Borden's Canadian operational head office moved to Toronto in 1931 when it acquired City Dairy. The old City Dairy Stables on Spadina Crescent was renamed Borden Stables and now part of the University of Toronto. Borden's Canadian operations slowly disappeared, with Quebec operations being sold to Agropur in 1976 and Ontario operations to Silverwood Dairy in 1980.

In the 1950s, Borden moved into the printing ink, fertilizer, and polyvinyl chloride (PVC) plastics business. By 1961, it was making 7 percent of all raw PVC in the United States. By 1968, Borden's international chemical and petroleum divisions had grown so large that Borden created the Borden Inc. International division to manage them. The company owned the Danish company Cocio from 1976 to 1999.

In 1987, Borden spun off some of its chemicals business in a public offering. Borden retained a small financial investment in the new company, known legally as Borden Chemicals & Plastics Operating Limited Partnership (BCPOLP).

=== Borden Food ===
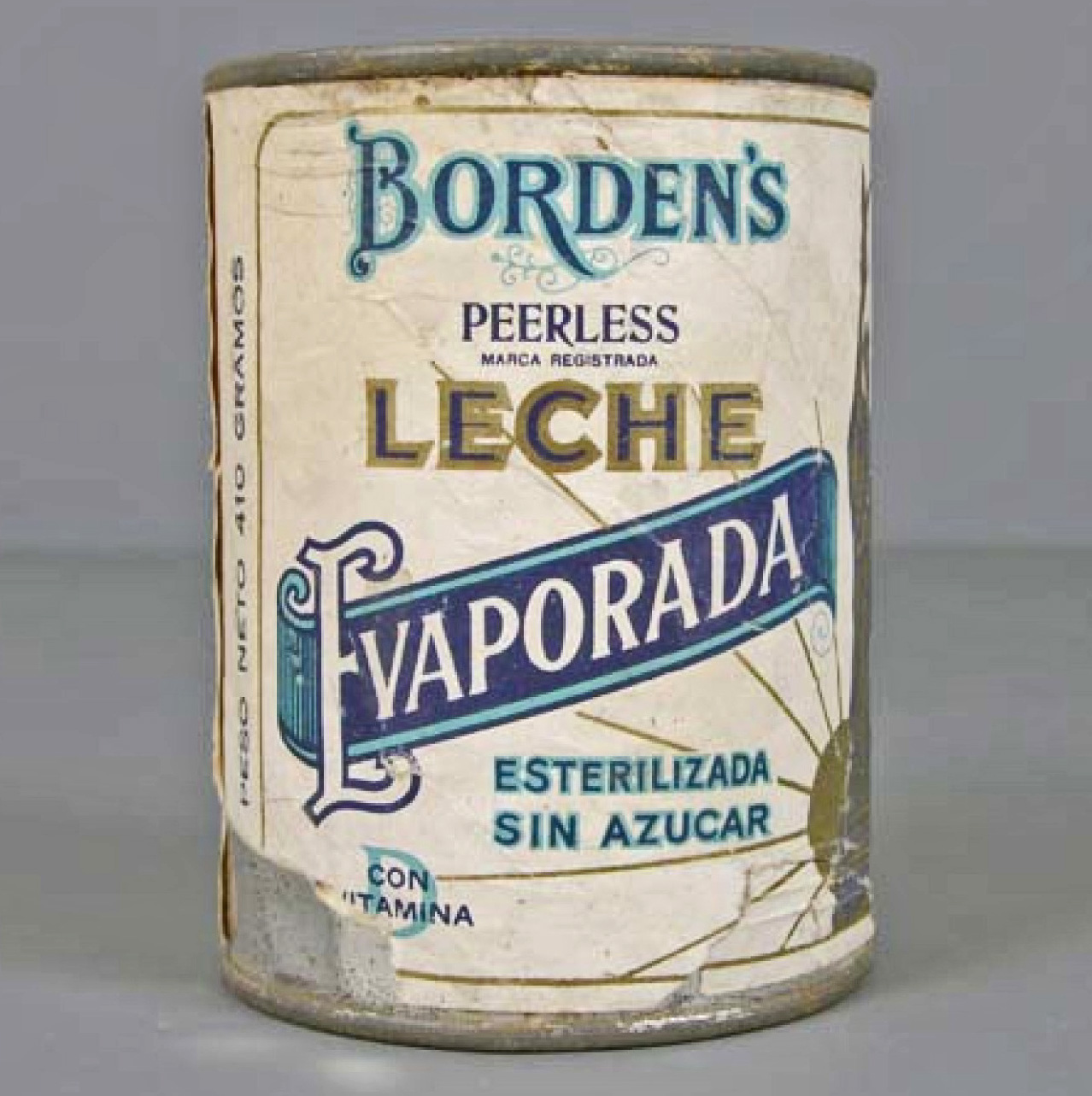
Can of Borden evaporated milk, c. 1950s

The food products division was spun off as Borden Food Corporation when Borden, Inc. became a holding company in 1929. The holding company reversed itself 13 years later when it reacquired its child company.

In the 1950s, the parent company went on a buying spree, swallowing up companies such as Wyler's, which made bouillon and powdered soft drinks; ReaLemon, a manufacturer of synthetic and reconstituted lemon juice; Cracker Jack (sold to Frito-Lay in 1997); Campfire brand marshmallows; Wise Foods, a maker of potato chips and other snack foods; and Bama, makers of jellies and jams.

Although Borden retrenched in the inflationary 1970s, it embarked on a second wave of mergers and acquisitions in the 1980s. It purchased Coco López in 1978 and Guys Snack Foods in 1979. It also purchased the Prince pasta manufacturing concern (giving Borden 30 percent of the domestic pasta market). In 1986, it purchased the dairy products division of Beatrice Foods, including the Meadow Gold brand. Stockholders blamed the company's decline on mismanagement, the incurrence of excessive debt to finance its numerous acquisitions, and several recent restructurings.

=== Demise ===
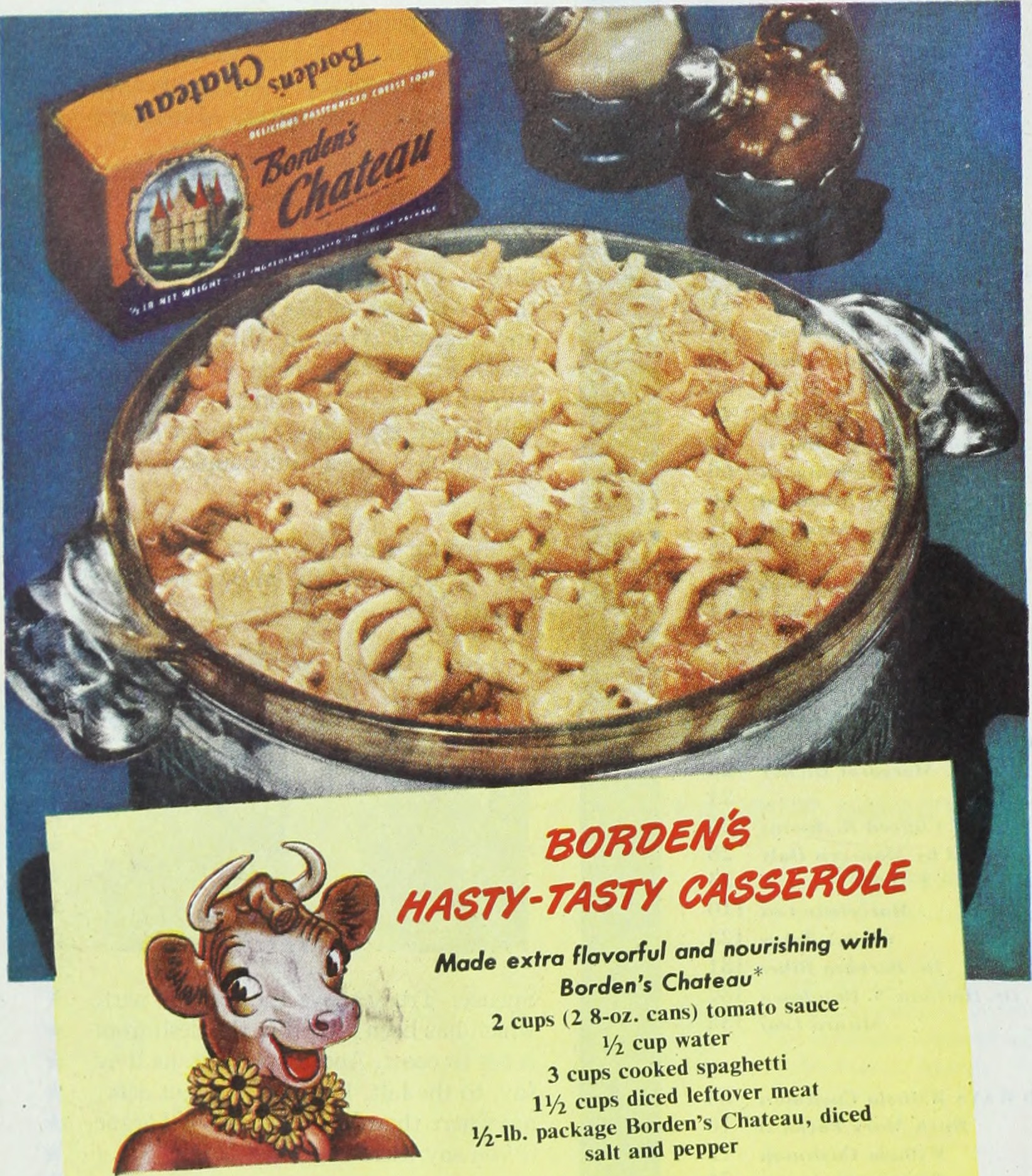
Ownership of "Elsie the Cow" (here featured in 1948) was retained by Borden when the company was sold to Southern Foods in 1997

Borden suffered significant losses for the period 1991–1993. A 1991 restructuring failed to integrate the company's brands and marketing efforts. When whole milk prices dropped in 1992, Borden Food did not lower its prices—causing a significant drop in market share from which it was not able to recover. Borden divested itself of nearly a third of its businesses in 1993 but could not find a buyer for its snack food concerns. In deep financial difficulty, Borden was bought out by Kohlberg Kravis Roberts (KKR) in 1995.

KKR increased the pace of divestiture but was unable to right the company. The company's Borden/Meadow Gold Dairies subsidiary was sold in September 1997 to Southern Foods, controlled by the Mid-America Dairymen (later the Dairy Farmers of America). Borden licensed the use of Elsie the Cow but retained ownership of the trademark. Southern Foods was acquired by Suiza Foods (now Dean Foods). The dairies are now owned by Dean Foods and Borden Dairy. Dairy Farmers of America retains Borden cheese.

In 1997, KKR focused the company solely on its pasta and pasta sauces lines, but the new strategy failed as well. In June 2001, Borden Food sold several pasta lines to the American Italian Pasta Company and its pasta sauce and soup businesses (including Wyler's) to the H. J. Heinz Company. In July 2001, Borden Foods sold its remaining pasta lines to New World Pasta.

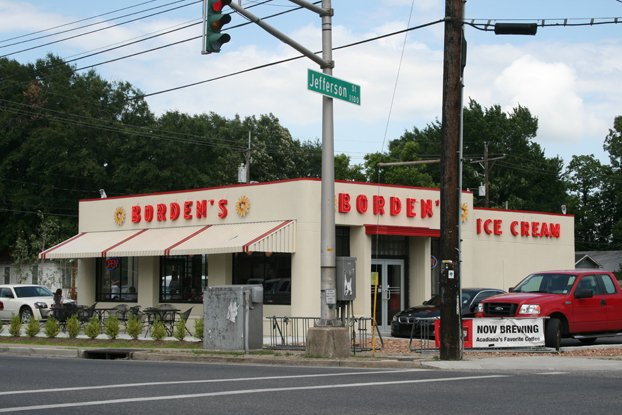
Borden's Ice Cream shop on corner of Johnston and Jefferson Sts., Lafayette, Louisiana, 2010

Borden, Inc., sold its final food product line, It's Pasta Anytime, to Kraft Foods in 2001 and shuttered its Foods division.

With the chemicals business the sole remaining operating company, in 2001 KKR merged Borden, Inc. into Borden Chemical, Inc., with the resulting company named Borden Chemical to emphasize the fact that chemicals were the company's sole remaining product line.

In 2004, KKR sold Borden Chemical to Apollo Management, a private equity firm. Borden Chemical was merged with Resolution Performance Products, Resolution Specialty Materials, and the German firm Bakelite AG to form Hexion Specialty Chemicals. With the merger (which settled in 2005), the last vestige of Borden, Inc. ceased to exist except as spin-offs and brand names. Hexion retained control over the Elsie the Cow trademarks and Borden name until Dec 2014 and has now assigned all Borden/Elsie trademarks in the U.S. to Grupo Lala of Durango, Mexico.

Borden once operated a chain of ice cream stores called Borden's Ice Cream, but only a single location in Lafayette, Louisiana, remains, under local ownership.

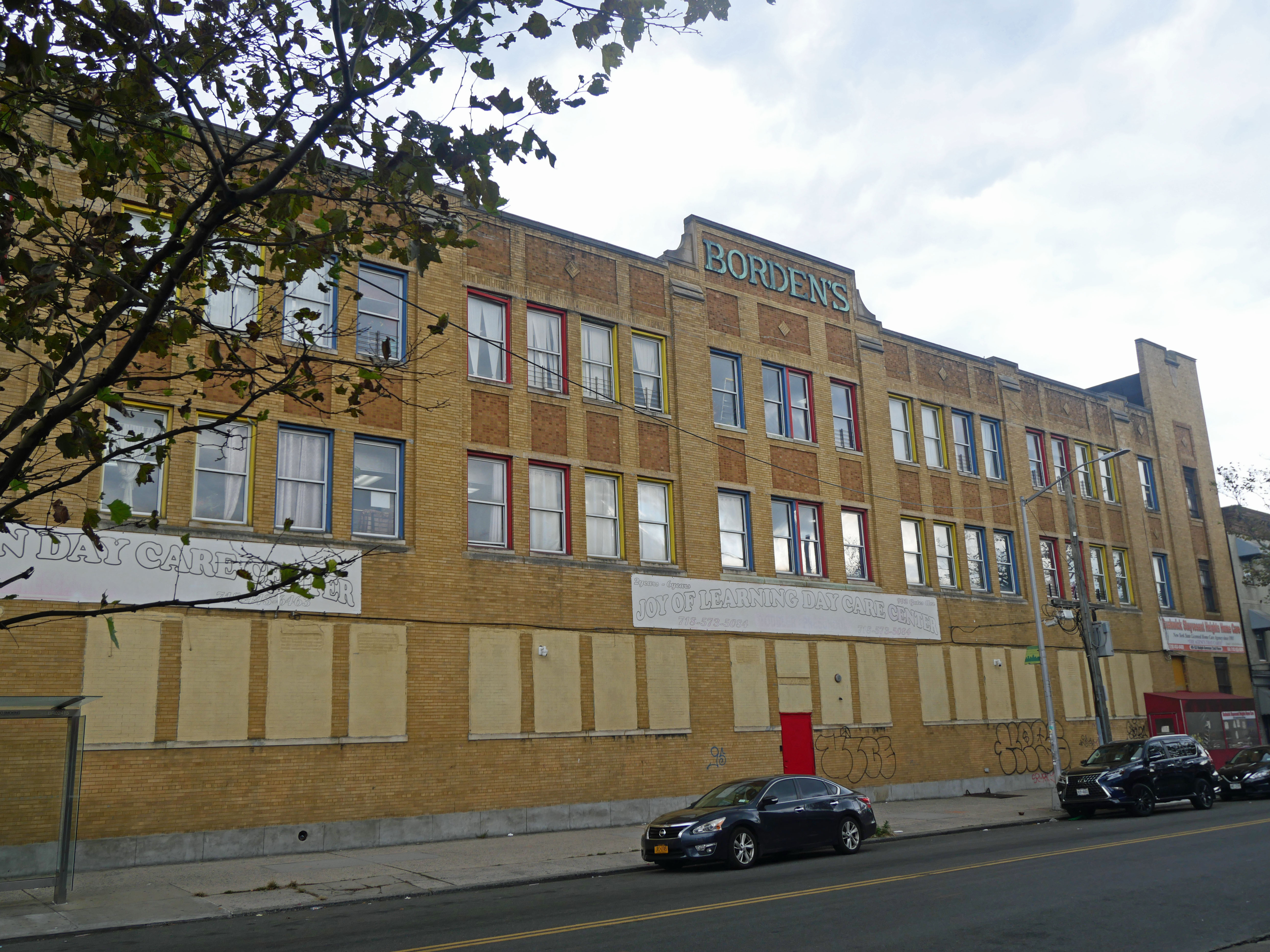
Borden building in Brooklyn

== Legacy ==
Several firms continue to use the name Borden and Elsie the Cow:

- Borden Dairy is a dairy distributor in Dallas, Texas.
- Eagle Family Foods Group LLC uses the name and Elsie for Eagle Brand canned milk products.

The Borden Buildings (North Building 563 Spadina Crescent and South Building 487 Spadina Crescent) in Toronto were once home to Borden Canadian dairy operations (founded in 1900 by Walt Massey as City Dairy) and are now used by the University of Toronto.

== Former brands ==
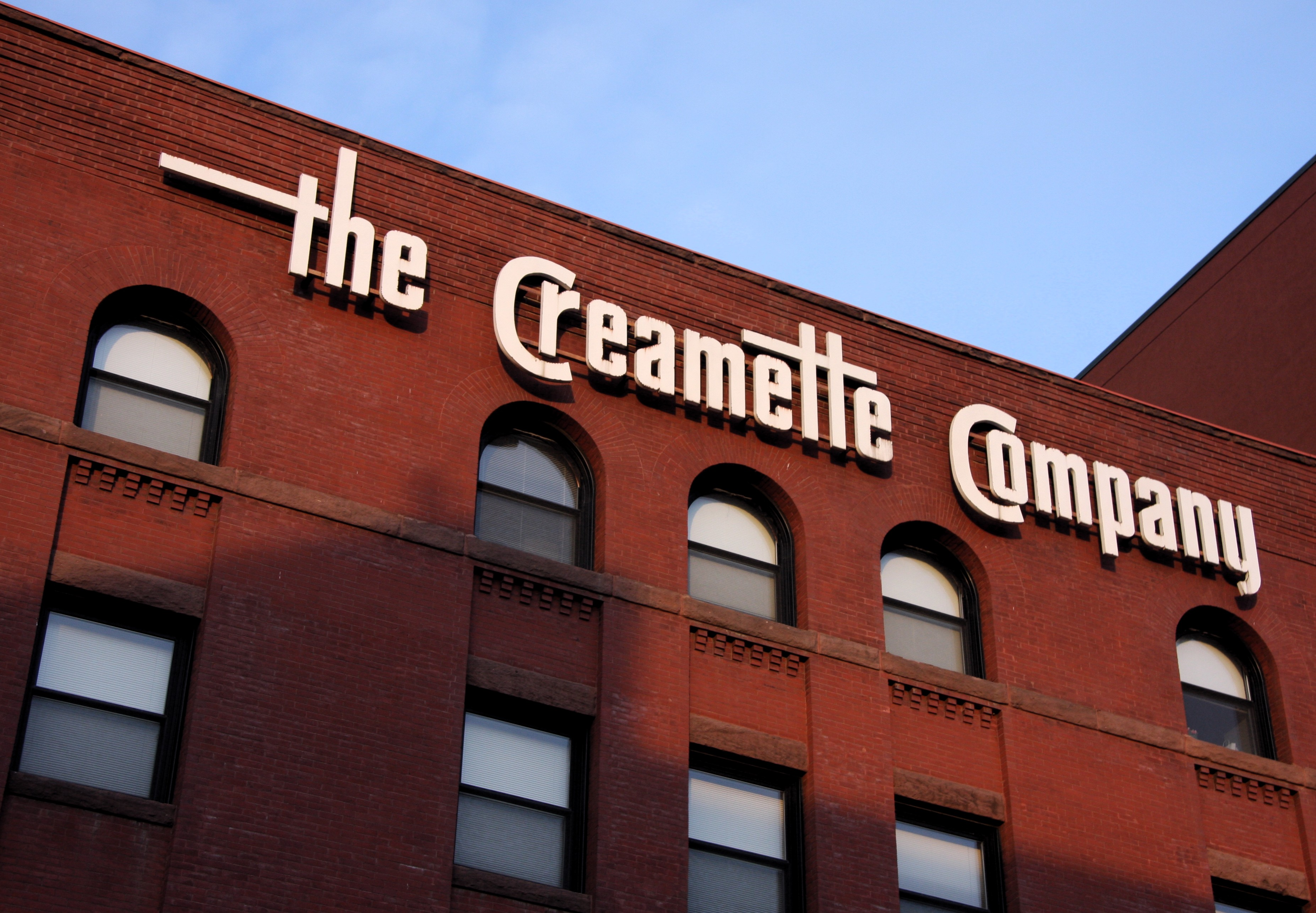
The Creamette Company Building in Minneapolis, Minnesota

- Anthony's pasta
- Bama jam and jelly
- Bennetts sauces
- Borden cheese
- Borden egg nog
- Campfire marshmallows
- Classico pasta sauce
- Cracker Jack
- Creamette pasta
- Cremora creamer
- Drake's Cakes
- Eagle Brand
- Elmer's glue
- Hemo malt chocolate drink
- Elsie Stix, construction toy using ice-cream sticks
- It's Pasta Anytime! convenience meals
- Kava coffee
- Klim
- Krylon spray paint
- Luxury pasta
- Meadow Gold milk
- Mystik Tape Corporation
- Mrs. Grass pasta and soup
- Nevada ice cream
- None Such mincemeat
- Pennsylvania Dutch pasta
- Prince pasta
- R&F pasta
- ReaLemon juice
- Ronco pasta
- Snow's chowder
- Starlac powdered milk
- Vimco Macaroni
- Wise snacks
- Wyler's soup and drink mixes

== See also ==
- Borden Milk Plant
- Rotolactor

== Sources ==
- "Apollo Buys Borden Chemical for $649 Million." New York Times. July 7, 2004.
- Buchanan, Doug. "Borden Foods Turns Out the Lights, Sells Final Holding." Business First of Columbus. August 27, 2001.
- International Directory of Company Histories. Vol. 22. Farmington Hills, Mich.: St. James Press, 1998. ISBN 1-55862-363-9
- Jensen, Elizabeth. "Crackerjack Plan? Borden to Sell Some Food Brands." Wall Street Journal. March 21, 1997.
