= Canasnack =

Oatmeal cookie developed for space travel

- Created by: Agriculture and Agri-Food Canada commissioned by the Canadian Space Agency
- Invented: 2007
- Main ingredients: oat flakes, canola oil, maple sugar
- Ingredients generally used: honey and blueberry, maple or cranberry cream filling

Canasnacks (short for Canadian snack) are oatmeal cookies created in 2007 by order of the Canadian Space Agency for consumption in space by Canadian astronauts. They were made in five different flavours. However, they were found to be too labour-intensive and expensive to make, so further orders were not placed in 2009. Instead, the Canadian Space Agency opted for ready-made snacks.

== Description ==
Canasnacks were a set of five small, round oatmeal cookies, each with a different flavour. The cookies comprised two halves held together by a cream filling. They are made in five traditional Canadian flavours: cranberry cream, blueberry cream, maple cream, honey biscuit with blueberry cream, and sweet and salty blueberry cream. The main ingredients were oats, canola oil, maple sugar, blueberries, and cranberries. The energy value of the product was 152 calories per pack.

Each individual cookie was made by hand and packaged in a flat, transparent vacuum bag. Each cookie was topped with a maple leaf—the national symbol of Canada. On one of the cookies, this maple leaf was coloured red. The packaging was labelled with a maple leaf, and the Canadian Space Agency's round logo, with a "bite" taken off the top.

== History ==
In December 2006, the Canadian Space Agency commissioned the Ministry of Agriculture and Agri-Food to develop a one-day menu suitable for astronauts working aboard the International Space Station (ISS). The space agency allocated C$65,000 to the project, and the Ministry of Agriculture and Agri-Food allocated nearly C$350,000.

Development began in February 2007 at the Nutrition Research Centre of the Institut de technologie agroalimentaire in Saint-Hyacinthe, Quebec, by a team led by Ted Farnworth. The product had to meet a number of requirements: it had to be tasty, nutritious, made in Canada, contain Canadian ingredients, and meet NASA microbiological requirements. The first such product was an oatmeal cookie. It was decided to make it round, without sharp edges, and small to reduce the likelihood of crumbs forming in space.

To bake the cookies, the laboratory had to purchase a special oven. The laboratory staff then tested and evaluated over one hundred combinations of ingredients from 37 Canadian suppliers. The product was named CANookie. Samples were sent to NASA's food lab, and in April 2007, the Canadian Space Agency presented the product to NASA. On June 1, the product was named Canasnack. Farnworth remarked that the Canadian Space Agency was able to demonstrate to NASA that it could not only build the Canadarm, but also make Canasnacks.

The crew of the STS-118 mission in 2007

In August 2007, Canasnacks were unveiled at a press conference featuring the crew of Space Shuttle Endeavour mission STS-118, which included Canadian astronaut Dave Williams. The STS-118 mission lasted from August 8 to 21, 2007. Williams called the cookies delicious, describing them as a "little bite that was out of this world."

Initially, the laboratory planned to bake no more than 50 to 70 cookies. Amid high demand from the public, the Ministry of Agriculture and the Office of the Prime Minister ordered samples for tasting. The Royal Agricultural Winter Fair requested 10,000 cookies for distribution to visitors—in the end, only a few samples were sent to the fair for a presentation. Farnworth explained that the laboratory was not in "the cookie business" and that they lacked the facilities to produce a high volume of Canasnacks, which required two employees to be diverted from other projects. He expressed hope that a private company would take up cookie production. Several manufacturers subsequently contacted the Canadian Space Agency, but a commercial release of the Canasnack did not occur.

In October 2007, the agency found that the requirement to use exclusively Canadian ingredients made the cookies more expensive than they otherwise would have been. Furthermore, cookie production proved too labour-intensive—especially the hand-coloured red maple leaf design. The project to develop Canadian space food did not receive further funding. Subsequently, Canasnacks were delivered to the ISS twice more in 2009. First, they were taken on the STS-125 flight, with the participation of American astronauts, then on the STS-127 flight.

== Ready-made snacks ==
The Canadian Space Agency abandoned the development of its own products in favour of purchasing off-the-shelf commercial ones. In 2011, a national competition, "Canadian Snacks for Space" selected twelve popular Canadian-made snacks suitable for long-term storage and use in space. As a result, the Canadian "space menu" included Quebec maple syrup, maple cream cookies, green tea cookies, apple chips, smoked salmon pâté, and a number of other products typical of the country. Canadian astronaut Chris Hadfield, who was part of the ISS-34 and ISS-35 expeditions (December 2012 – May 2013), for whom this food was intended, stated that "sharing this food will not only lift our spirits, but it will also give me the chance to tell the crew a little bit about the diversity and richness of the natural and cultural landscapes of Canada."

In 2026, for NASA's Artemis II mission, which included Canadian astronaut Jeremy Hansen, the Canadian Space Agency prepared foods, including strawberry lavender superseed cereal, smoked salmon, shrimp curry with rice, Quebec maple syrup, and maple cream cookies.
