= Maple leaf cream cookie =

Canadian sandwich cookie

- A maple leaf cream cookie, with visible veins on the leaf
- Main ingredients: Filling: cream flavoured with maple syrup or maple flavouring

Maple leaf cream (or creme) cookies are Canadian sandwich cookies. The cream filling is maple-flavoured and may contain real maple syrup. The cookies are shaped like a maple leaf, a national symbol of Canada.

Cookie sellers such as Dare Foods popularized maple leaf cream cookies.

In February 2009, cookies made by a bakery in Ottawa became famous after President Barack Obama bought them for his daughters. In 2016, he returned to the same bakery and bought them again.

In 2007, an oatmeal cookie with maple syrup as one of its flavours was developed for space travel that became known as Canasnack. Maple cream cookies were served on the International Space Station (ISS) throughout 2011 to 2013 after a contest was held to decide which foods to bring to space. After Artemis II lost contact with Earth in 2026, astronauts commemorated the moment by eating maple cream cookies.

== Description ==
Traditional Canadian maple cookies are golden-yellow in colour, with a soft texture and the delicate flavour of maple syrup, which is added to the dough. For baking, it is recommended to use grade two syrup, which has a fairly rich flavour (Canadian maple syrup is divided into three grades, depending on the time of year: grade one is the earliest, lighter and milder in flavour, and grade three is the latest, darker and tart).

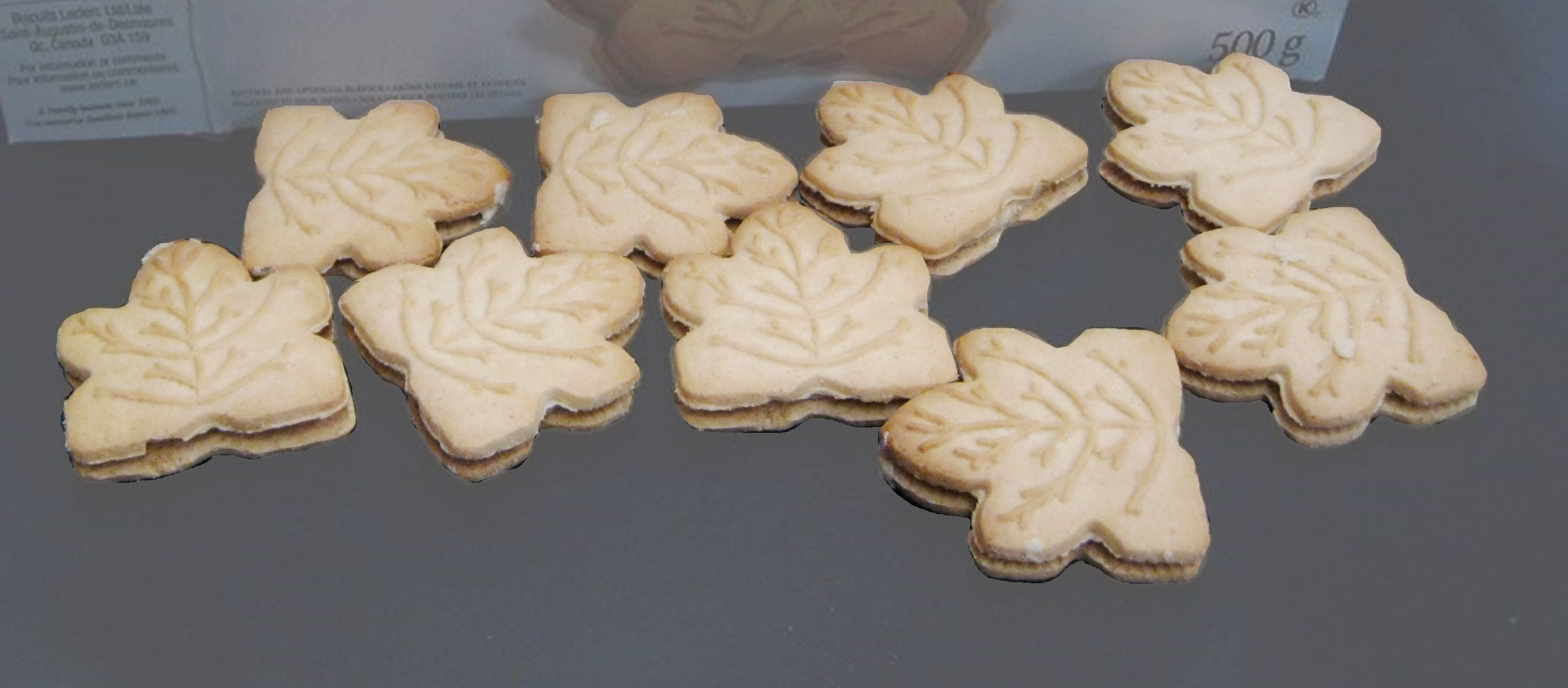
Maple cookies produced by Leclerc (Quebec, Canada)

To enhance the flavour and aroma, the cookies are additionally sprinkled with maple sugar on top or covered with glaze, also based on maple syrup.

In the United States, where maple flavour is generally considered unusual, maple sugar may be substituted by sweeter cane sugar in recipes—for example, the Vermont maple cookie recipe recommends using 3/4 cane sugar and only 1/4 maple sugar. These cookies are sweeter but less flavourful.

According to recommendations, maple cookies go well with hot chocolate or cider, both alcoholic and non-alcoholic.

== Ingredients ==
A typical Canadian recipe consists of the following ingredients:

=== Cookies ===
- 3 1/4 cups all-purpose flour
- 1/2 teaspoon baking soda
- 1/2 teaspoon salt
- 1 cup softened unsalted butter
- 1 cup granulated sugar
- 1/2 cup packed light brown sugar
- 2 large eggs
- 2 teaspoons vanilla extract
- 1 teaspoon maple extract
- 1 tablespoon pure maple syrup

=== Maple filling ===
- 2 cups confectioners' sugar, divided
- 1/4 cup vegetable shortening
- 1 large egg white
- 1/2 teaspoon vanilla extract
- 1 teaspoon maple extract

== Preparation ==
The first step is to put an electric mixer on medium speed to cream eggs, granulated sugar, butter, brown sugar, maple extract, vanilla, and maple syrup. In a large bowl, combine flour, baking soda, and salt. Stir into butter mixture and then refrigerate for eight hours or overnight. Then using a maple leaf cookie cutter, cut them out and place them in the oven for 8–10 minutes.

To make the maple filling, put an electric mixer on medium speed and mix the confectioners' sugar, vegetable shortening, egg white, and vanilla, and maple extract.

== History ==
British and French colonists, beginning to settle the east coast of North America, adopted some traditions from the Indigenous peoples, including the sweet syrup obtained from the sap of maple trees growing in the region. Europeans adapted traditional baking recipes to this new product. This locally produced natural sweetener became a cheap alternative to cane sugar for the colonists, eliminating the need to import this product from slave plantations of the Caribbean. Maple syrup was first used by French colonists during the 1700s.

Maple products are considered emblematic of Canada and are frequently sold in tourist shops and airports as souvenirs from Canada. The sugar maple's leaf has come to symbolize Canada, and is depicted on the country's flag. Almost all of the world's maple syrup is produced in the United States and Canada, with Quebec alone accounting for 72% of global output. Charles H. Doerr, a German immigrant to Canada, is widely credited for creating the cookie business that would later be turned into Dare Foods, a major seller of maple cookies. He anglicized his surname to Dare, which has the same pronunciation, giving the company the current name.

== Obama cookie ==
Obama cookies on sale at the ByWard Market in Ottawa in 2009

In February 2009, maple cookies produced by the local bakery Le Moulin de Provence became especially popular in Ottawa. This happened after US President Barack Obama, in Canada on his first state visit, visited the ByWard Market on his way to Ottawa Macdonald–Cartier International Airport on February 19 and purchased several of these cookies for his daughters – he specifically went to the bakery for the "maple leaf–shaped" cookies, telling the seller that he "understood why Canadians love them". Claude Bonnet, the baker and owner of the bakery, refused to accept payment, telling the president that they were a gift for his daughters.

Immediately after this incident, these cookies, covered with red icing and having the word "Canada" written in white icing, were called "Obama cookies". The bakery, which had previously sold approximately 200 to 250 of these cookies a week, began selling 2000 to 3000 daily after the US president's visit. Orders began coming in from the US and Europe. Local entrepreneurs began producing T-shirts with images of these cookies. Obama also purchased BeaverTails that became known as "Obama Tail".

For Obama's next visit in June 2016, the bakery owner released a special, oversized cookie, not intended for mass sale, featuring a joint portrait of Barack Obama, Canadian Prime Minister Justin Trudeau, and Mexican President Enrique Peña Nieto. Liberal MP Peter Schiefke purchased the cookie, intending to share it with his party colleagues to commemorate the successful summit, which was nicknamed the "Meeting of the Three Amigos" in Canada.

== In space ==
=== Canasnack ===
In 2007, the Canadian Space Agency, in collaboration with Agriculture and Agri-Food Canada, developed Canasnack, a "space" oatmeal cookie with five different flavours, including maple syrup. The cookie's "convenient" shape was noted as ensuring no crumbs in orbit. Canasnack was carried on the STS-118 Space Shuttle mission, which included Canadian Dafydd Williams, in August 2007. At a press conference after his return, Williams gave the cookie a thumbs-up. In May 2009, Canasnack was carried on the STS-125 mission, and in July on the STS-127 mission, whose crew included Canadian Julie Payette.

=== On the ISS ===
Maple cookies were part of the space menu for Canadian astronaut Chris Hadfield, who was the first Canadian to conduct a spacewalk and spent time on the ISS as part of Expeditions ISS-34 and ISS-35, from December 2012 to May 2013. To prepare food for his six-month stay in space, in 2011 the Canadian Space Agency held a national competition, Canadian Snacks for Space, which selected twelve popular snacks sold in Canadian stores. As a result, Quebec maple syrup, maple syrup cookies, apple chips, smoked salmon pâté, and other typical Canadian foods were purchased and delivered to the ISS in two shipments. According to Hadfield, "Sharing this food will not only lift our spirits, but it will also give me the chance to tell the crew a little bit about the diversity and richness of the natural and cultural landscapes of Canada."

=== Artemis II ===
Under the terms of the 2020 agreement between the United States and Canada, Canadian astronaut Jeremy Hansen was included on the crew of NASA's Artemis II mission, along with three Americans (during the mission, he became the first Canadian to fly beyond low Earth orbit). In November 2023, during preparations for the flight, Hansen told the press that he planned to take maple cream cookies with him to please the crew's commander, Reid Wiseman, who "absolutely adores them". The astronaut added that the cookies were "a piece of Canada", and he was confident the crew would appreciate them. In February 2025, the Canadian Space Agency announced the food package that would be provided to the Artemis II crew by Canada. It included five traditional Canadian dishes: strawberry lavender superseed cereal, smoked salmon, shrimp rice, maple syrup, and maple cookies. Jeremy Hansen, who participated in the press conference, made reporters laugh by stating that while there were certain rules for eating in space, requiring avoiding crumbs and maintaining cleanliness, he did not intend to shove the cookies whole in his mouth, as there was "simple common sense" in choosing the right amount.

The issue of Canadian cookie crumbs had been raised before. In 2022, the Canadian Space Agency tweeted, "Poutine doesn't leave crumbs floating around the station. Should we tell NASA?" to which the US space agency immediately responded, "That would be fabulous!"

On April 6, 2026, during the mission, the Orion spacecraft entered a lunar transfer orbit and began its flyby. At 22:44 UTC, as the satellite passed between the Earth and the spacecraft, Orion entered the Moon's radio shadow, cutting off radio contact with NASA's deep space ground stations for 40 minutes. The crew put aside their duties and briefly gathered, for about 30 seconds, to share maple cream cookies, making this what Hansen called a "surreal moment".
