= Space food =

Food consumed by astronauts in outer space

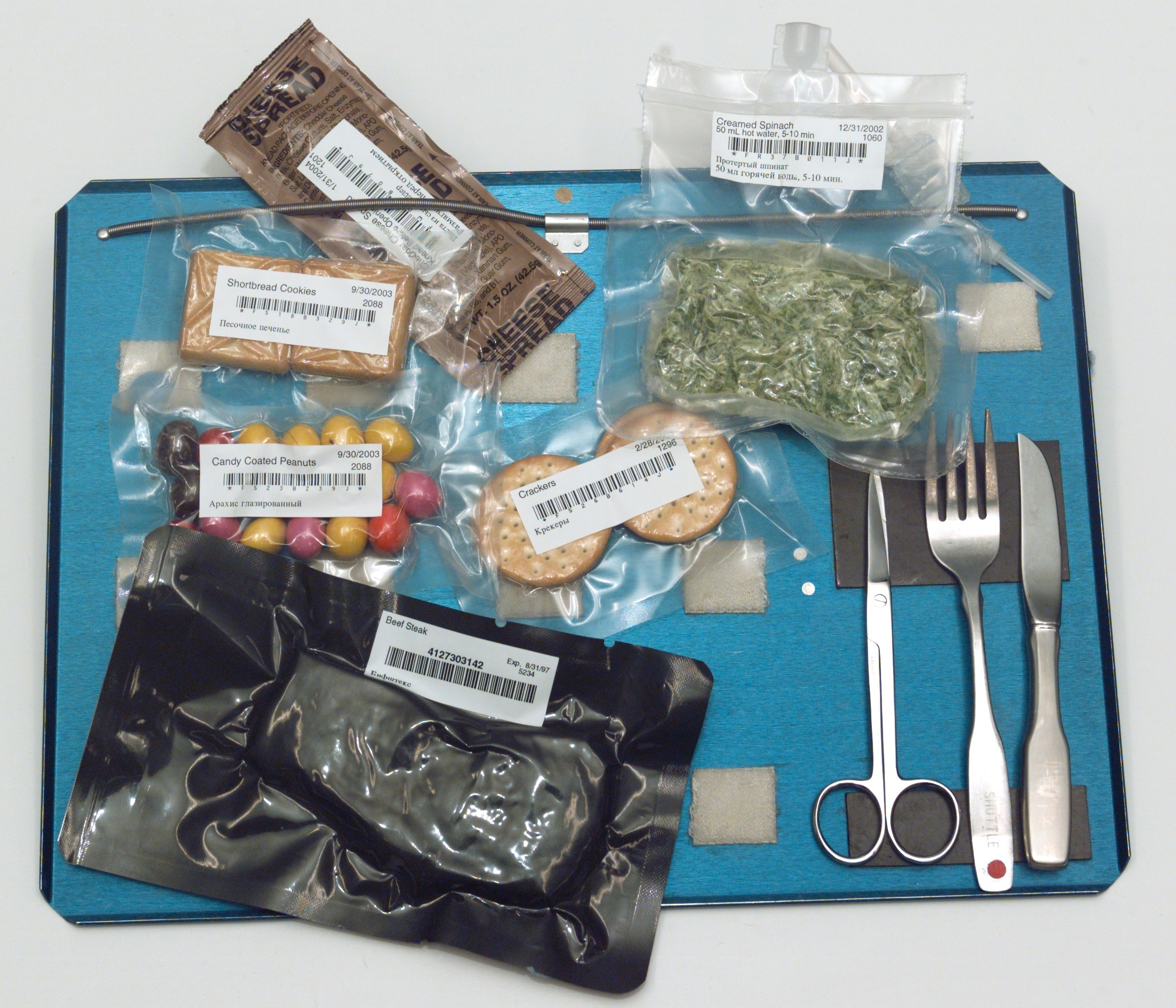
An example of food eaten on the International Space Station. Note the use of magnets, springs, and Velcro to hold the cutlery and food packets to the tray. Going clockwise, items include cheese spread, creamed spinach, crackers, beef steak, candy coated peanuts, and shortbread cookies.

Space food is a type of food product created and processed for consumption by astronauts during missions to outer space. Such food has specific requirements to provide a balanced diet and adequate nutrition for individuals working in space while being easy and safe to store, prepare and consume in the equipment-filled weightless environments of crewed spacecraft. Space food is commonly freeze-dried to minimize weight and ensure long shelf life. Before eating, it is rehydrated. Unmodified food, such as items of spirulina, fruit, and even a sandwich, have been brought into space. Packaging varies, including tubes, cans, and sealed plastic packages.

In recent years, space food has been used by various nations engaging in space programs as a way to share and show off their cultural identity and facilitate intercultural communication. Although astronauts consume a wide variety of foods and beverages in space, the initial idea from The Man in Space Committee of the Space Science Board in 1963 was to supply astronauts with a formula diet that would provide all the needed vitamins and nutrients.

== Types ==
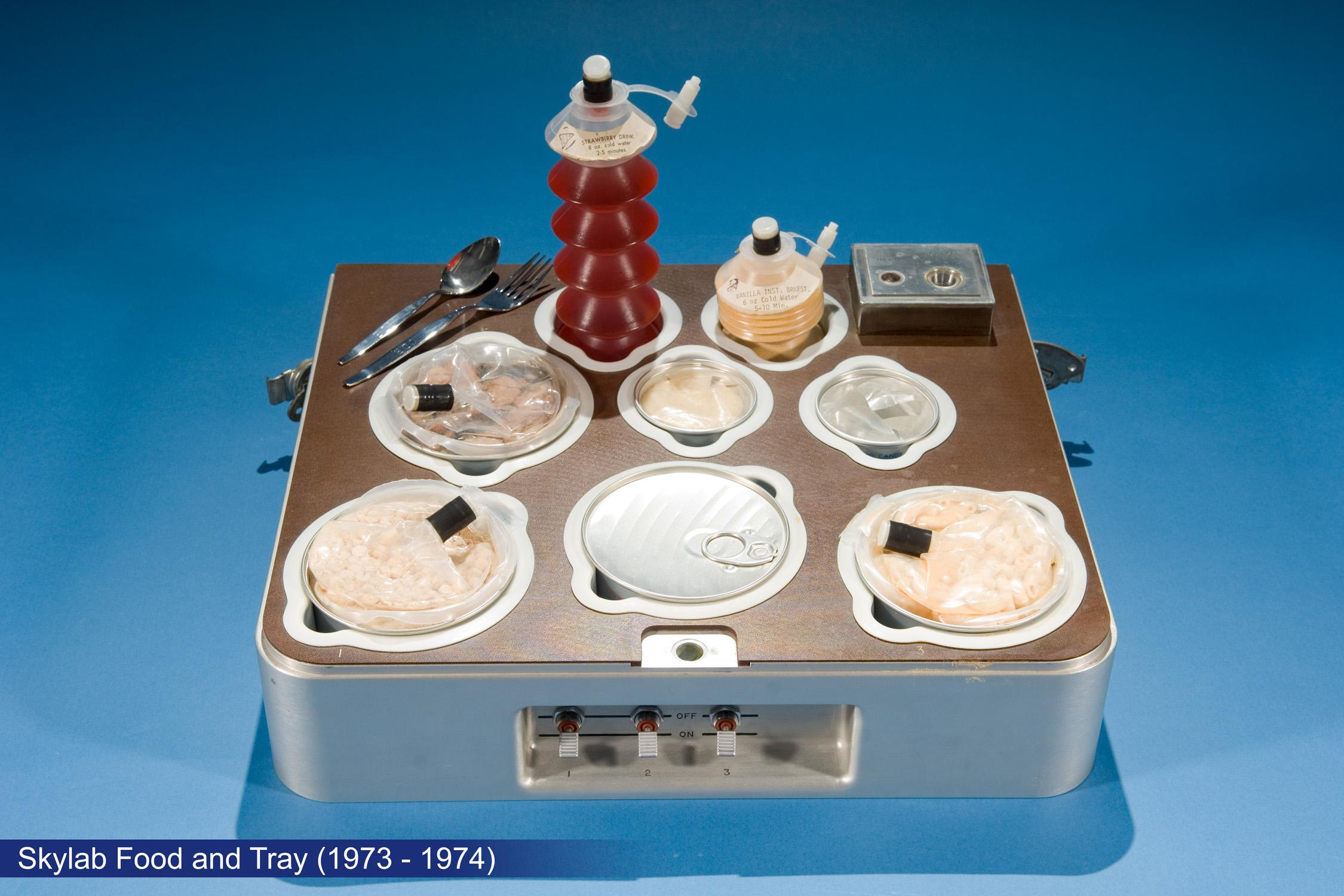
Food and tray from the Skylab era (1973–74)

There are several classifications of space food, as follows:

Beverages (B)
Freeze dried drink mixes (coffee or tea) or flavored drinks (lemonade or orange drink) are provided in vacuum-sealed beverage pouches. Coffee and tea may have powdered cream and/or sugar added depending on personal taste preferences. Empty beverage retort pouches are provided for drinking water.

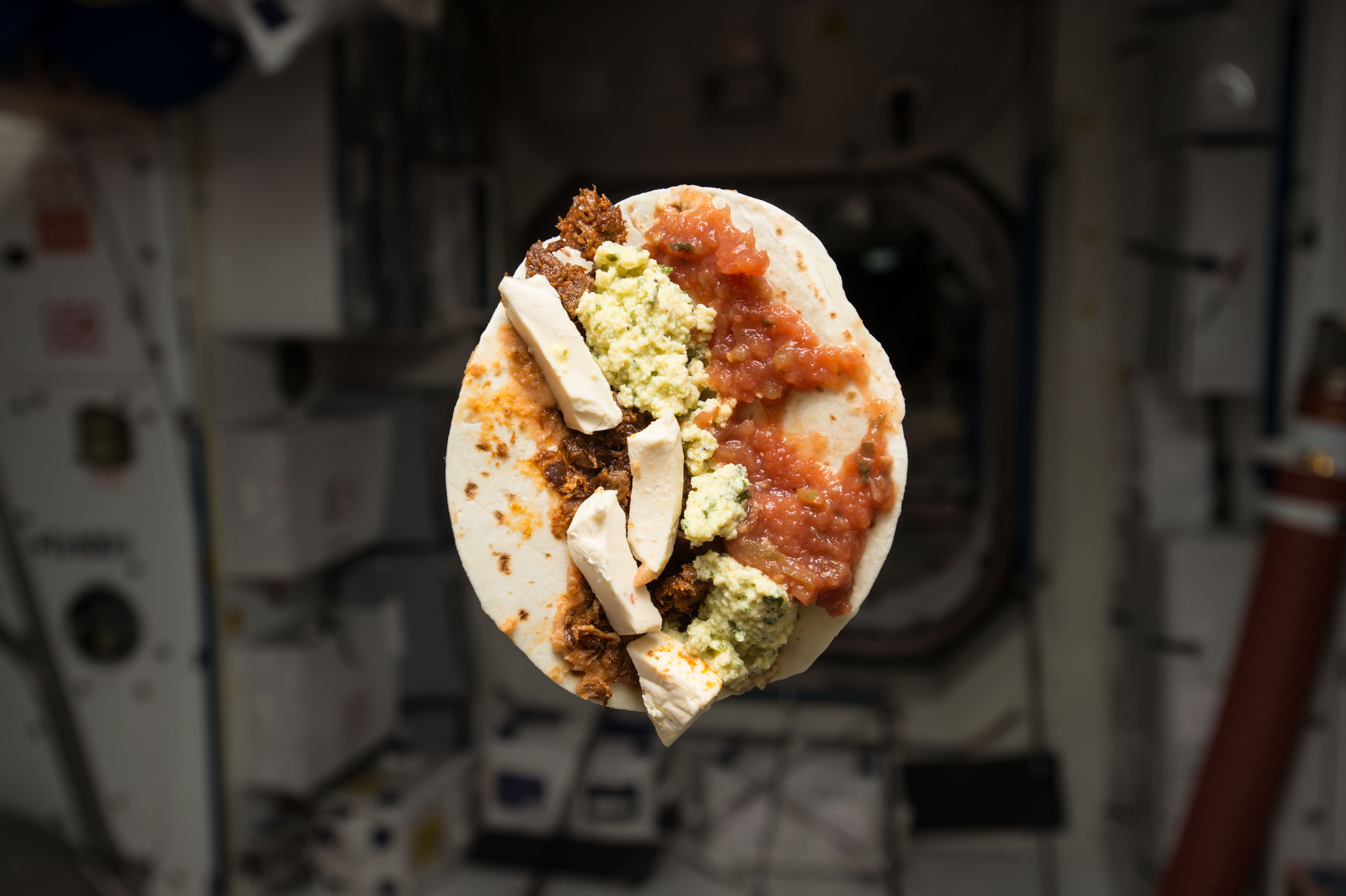
Breakfast taco created by crew of ISS-47. It contains refried beans, shredded pork, pepperjack cheese, scrambled eggs, and salsa on a tortilla.

Fresh Foods (FF)
Fresh fruits, vegetables, and tortillas delivered by resupply missions. These foods spoil quickly and need to be eaten within the first two days of the package's arrival to the ISS to prevent spoilage. These foods are provided as psychological support for astronauts who may not return home for extended periods of time.
Irradiated (I) Meat
Beef steak that is sterilized with ionizing radiation to keep the food from spoiling. NASA has dispensation from the U.S. Food and Drug Administration (FDA) to use this type of food sterilization.
Intermediate Moisture (IM)
Foods that have some moisture but not enough to cause immediate spoilage. Examples include sausage and beef jerky.
Natural Form (NF)
Commercially available, shelf-stable foods, such as nuts, cookies, and granola bars, that are ready to eat.
Rehydratable (R) Foods
Foods that have been dehydrated by various technologies (such as drying with heat, osmotic drying, and freeze drying) and allowed to rehydrate in hot water prior to consumption. Reducing the water content reduces the ability of microorganisms to thrive.
Thermostabilized (T)
Also known as the retort process, this process heats foods to destroy pathogens, microorganisms, and enzymes that may cause spoilage.
Extended shelf-life bread products
Scones, waffles, and rolls specially formulated to have a shelf life of up to 18 months.

More common staples and condiments do not have a classification and are known simply by the item name.

== Processing ==
Designing food for consumption in space is an often difficult process. Foods must meet a number of criteria to be considered fit for space. Food must be physiologically appropriate, in that it must be nutritious, easily digestible, and palatable. Secondly, the food must be engineered for consumption in a zero-gravity environment. As such, the food must be light, well packaged, fast to serve, and require minimal cleaning up. Finally, foods require a minimum of energy expenditure throughout their use; they must store well, open easily, and leave little waste behind (foods that tend to leave crumbs, for example, are ill-suited for space). Tortillas are a practical alternative to bread in space because they do not create crumbs in microgravity.

Carbonated drinks have been tried in space but are not favored due to changes in belching caused by microgravity. Without gravity to separate the liquid and gas in the stomach, burping results in a kind of vomiting called "wet burping". Coca-Cola and Pepsi were first carried on STS-51-F in 1985. Coca-Cola has flown on subsequent missions in a specially designed dispenser that utilizes BioServe Space Technologies hardware used for biochemical experiments. Space Station Mir carried cans of Pepsi in 1996.

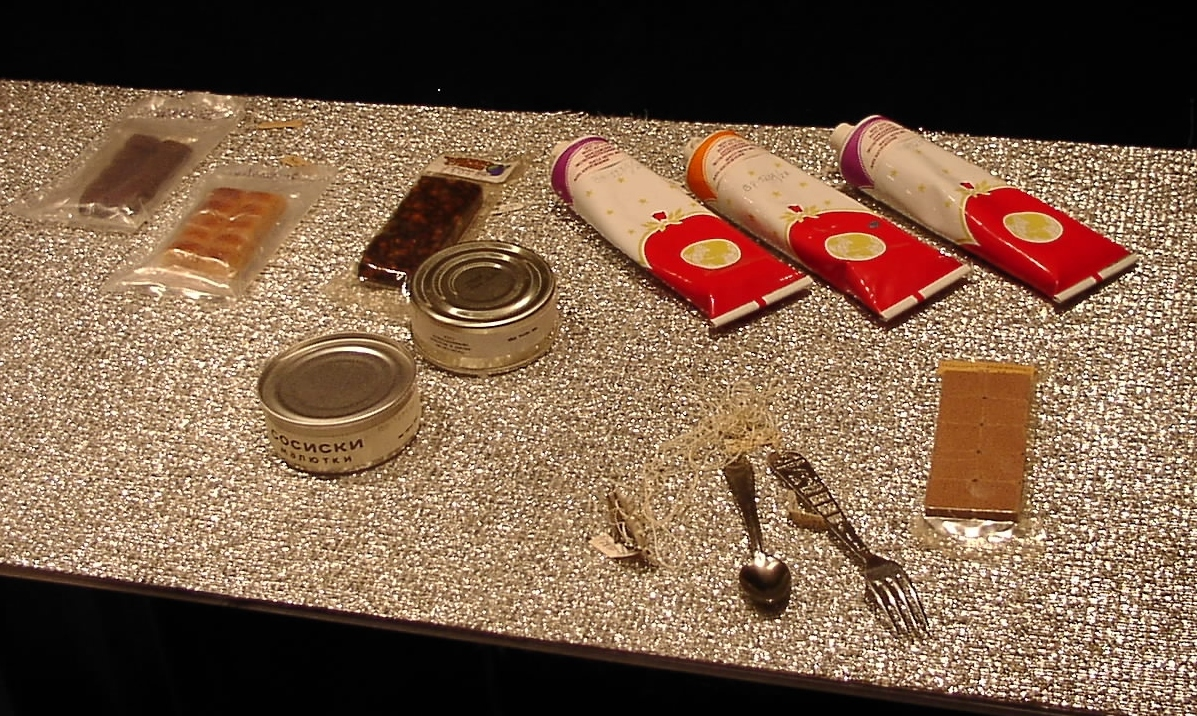
Russian space food

Beer has also been developed that counteracts the reduction of taste and smell reception in space and reduces the possibility of wet burps in microgravity. A parabolic flight experiment using Vostok, a specially-produced stout by Four Pines, validated that the reduced carbonation recipe met the criteria intended for space. Barley harvested from crops grown for several generations in space has also been brought back to Earth to produce beer. While not a space food (it used the same high carbonation 'Earth' recipe), the study did demonstrate that ingredients grown in space are safe for production.

Space bread has proved elusive because of a variety of challenges. By 2012 a method was suggested where the dough is leavened by dissolved CO_{2} (as opposed to yeast) and cooked by a low-temperature process, which could allow for fresh bread to be baked from bulk ingredients on future spaceflights.

== Packaging ==
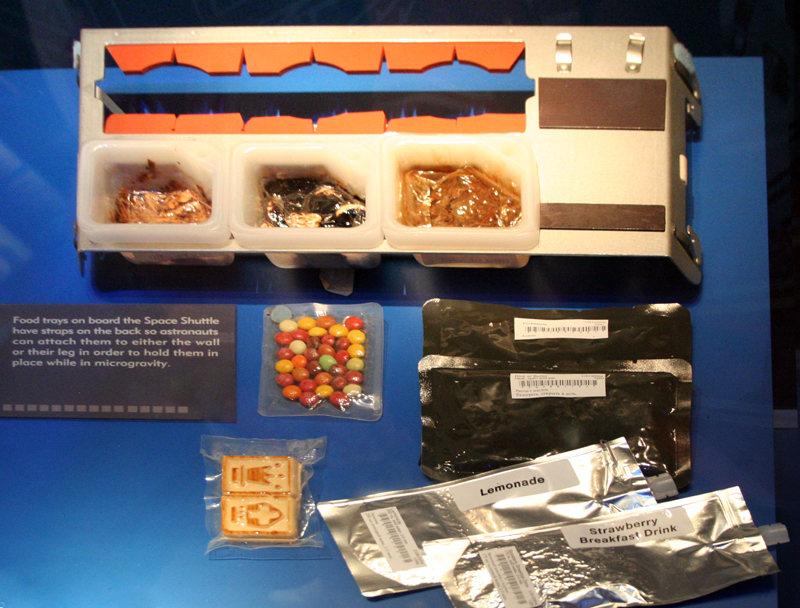
Food tray used aboard the Space Shuttles

The primary purpose of packaging space food is preserving and containing the food. However, the packaging must also be light-weight, easy to dispose of and useful in the preparation of the food for consumption. The packaging also includes a bar-coded label, which allows for the tracking of an astronaut's diet. The labels also specify the food's preparation instructions in both English and Russian.

Many foods from the Russian space program are packaged in cans and tins. These are heated through electro-resistive (ohmic) methods, opened with a can-opener, and the food inside consumed directly. Russian soups are hydrated and consumed directly from their packages.

NASA space foods are packaged in retort pouches or employ freeze drying. They are also packaged in sealed containers which fit into trays to keep them in place. The trays include straps on the underside, allowing astronauts to attach the tray to an anchor point such as their legs or a wall surface and include clips for retaining a beverage pouch or utensils in the microgravity environment.

== Cooking in space ==
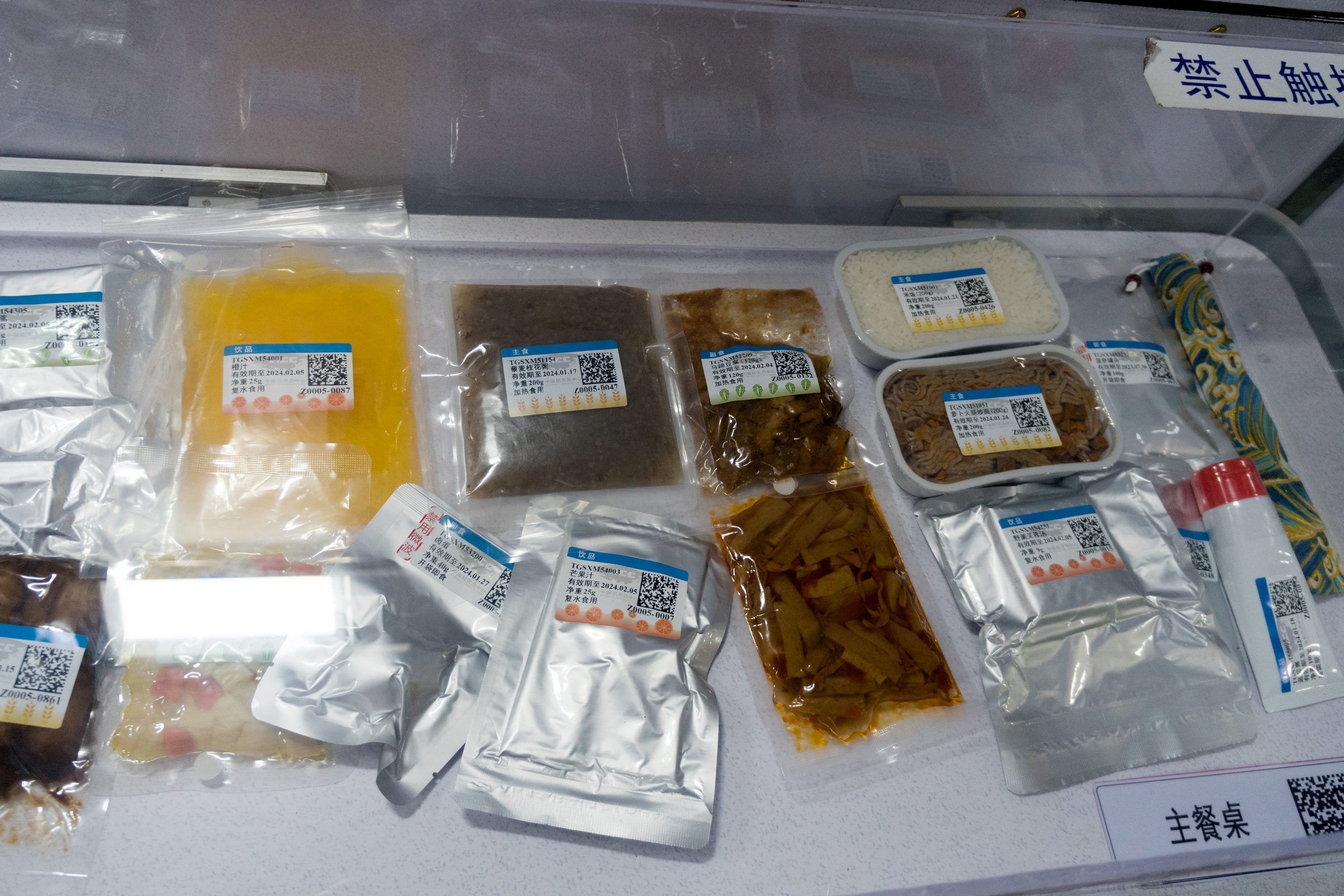
Various space food supplied to the Chinese Tiangong space station, including packages suitable for cooking in the microwave oven (go to details page for label translations)

The International Space Station is fitted with rehydration chambers and food warmers to prepare the packaged food before consumption. The first galley on ISS was located in the Russian Orbital Segment (ROS), containing a hydration system for reheating food, and a food warmer for canned food. The United States developed the second food warmer system in a briefcase-like shape to provide the reheating function for packet-style food items. A second galley was added to the Unity module due to the crew size increase. Combined dinners were rare, as Russian, Space Shuttle, and other ISS astronauts were often eating in their own segments with different schedules.

On Tiangong Space Station, the kitchen is located in the Tianhe core module, along with living quarters and entertainment systems. The kitchen is equipped with a small table for food preparation and the first-ever microwave oven in spaceflight. Huang Weifen, the chief astronaut trainer of China Manned Space Agency (CMSA), explained that the intention was to make sure that astronauts can "always have hot food whenever they need." China later experimented with using convection oven in space. Shenzhou 21 delivered an air fryer to the Tiangong, which features built-in air purification and residue collector to allow safe usage inside confined space and microgravity. The new oven allows baking and grilling of food, instead of simple reheating. Chinese astronauts cooked barbecue chicken wings and grilled steak with it.

== History ==
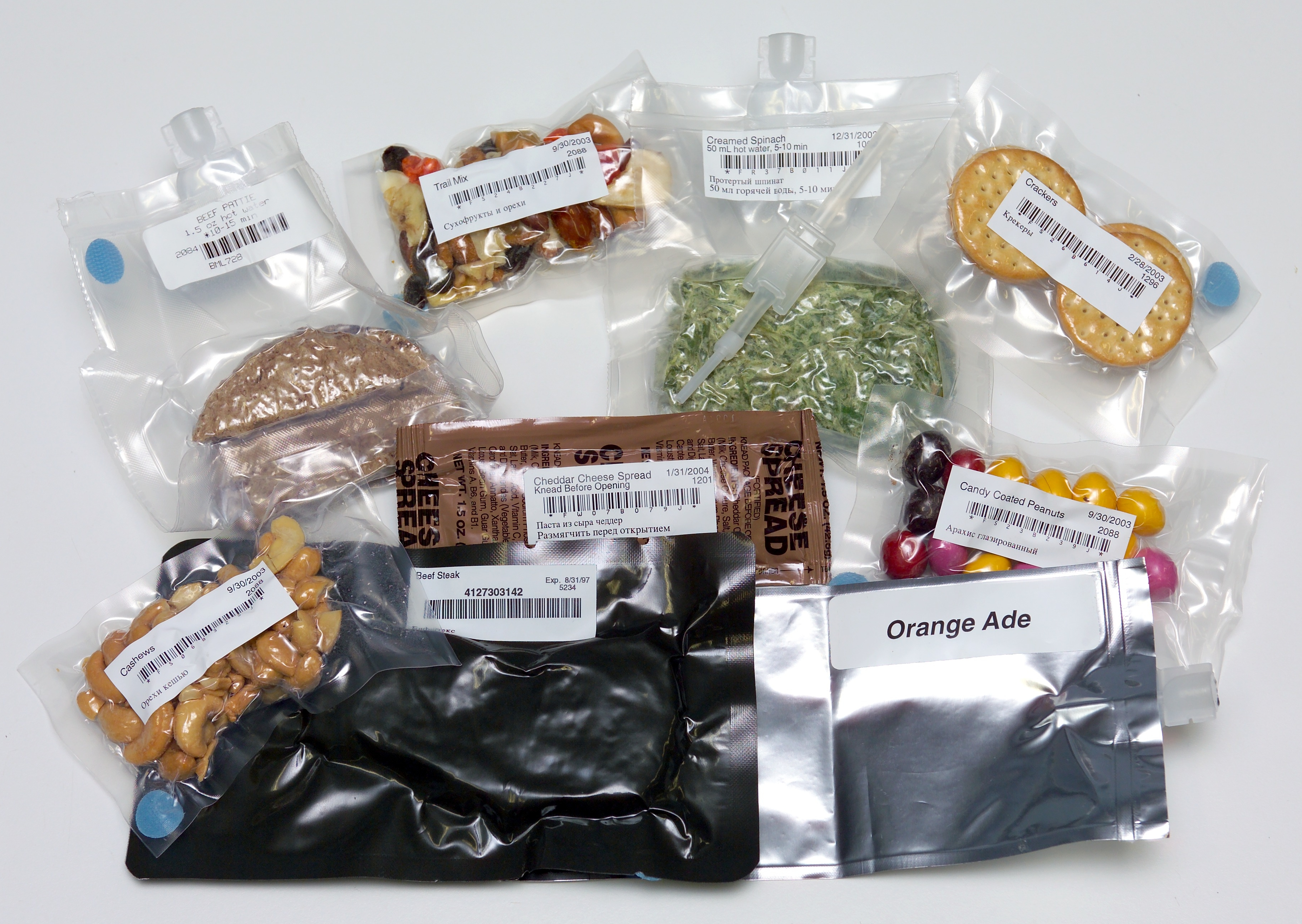
Assortment of foods served aboard the ISS

Early space food was primarily composed of bite-sized cubes, freeze-dried powders, and thick liquids stuffed in aluminum tubes. First used on the 3rd Mercury mission in 1962, US astronaut John Glenn was the first to eat directly from an aluminum tube, specifically applesauce. However the tubes were eventually discontinued as their design did not allow the food to be smelled or seen, and the texture also posed limitations on the variety of food that could be made available. Freeze-dried powders that could be re-hydrated were also available, as well as high-calorie bite sized cubes of food. These solutions had their own challenges, however over time, the powders were made easier to re-freeze, and the cubes were coated in gelatin to prevent crumbling on the equipment. With the introduction of the "spoon bowl," on the Apollo 8 mission, astronauts were able to open the contents of the package and eat the simple meal with a spoon.

For lunch on Vostok 1 (1961), Yuri Gagarin ate from three 160 g (5.6 oz) toothpaste-type tubes, two of which contained servings of puréed meat and one which contained chocolate sauce.

In August 1961, Soviet Cosmonaut Gherman Titov became the first human to experience space sickness on Vostok 2; he holds the record for being the first person to vomit in space. This event "heralded the need for space flight nutrition."

John Glenn, as the first American to orbit Earth in 1962, was to experiment with eating in weightless conditions. Some experts had been concerned that weightlessness would impair swallowing. Glenn experienced no such difficulties, and it was determined that microgravity did not affect the natural swallowing process, which is enabled by the peristalsis of the esophagus.

Astronauts in later Mercury missions (1959–1963) disliked the food that was provided. They ate bite-sized cubes, freeze-dried powders, and tubes of semiliquids. The astronauts found it unappetizing, experienced difficulties in rehydrating the freeze-dried foods, and did not like having to squeeze tubes or collect crumbs. Prior to the mission, the astronauts were also fed low residual launch-day breakfasts to reduce the chances that they would defecate in flight.

=== Project Gemini and Apollo (1965–1975) ===
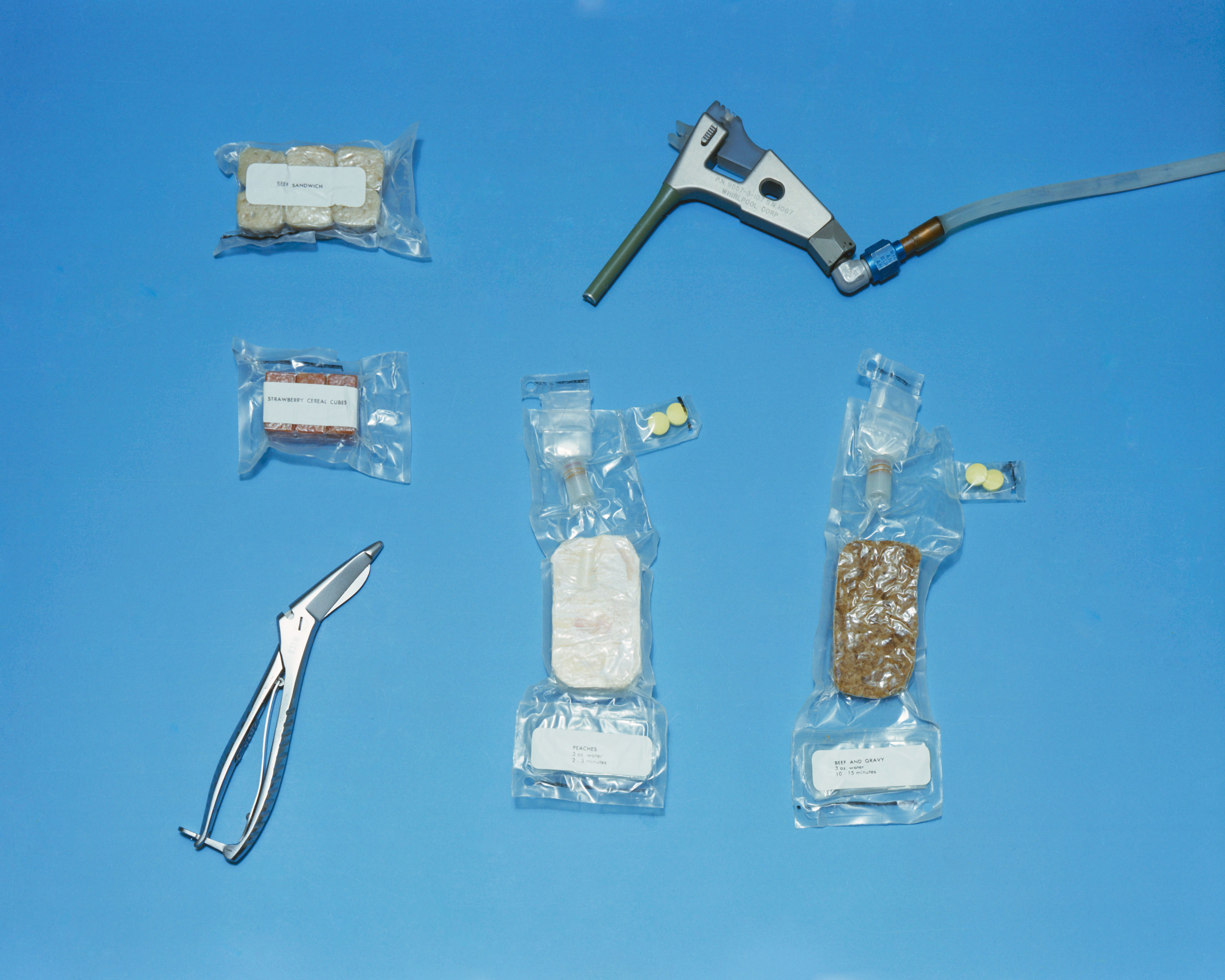
Space food for Gemini. The water gun was for rehydrating the food in the packages.

Several of the food issues from the Mercury missions were addressed for the later Gemini missions (1965–1966). Tubes (often heavier than the foods they contained) were abandoned, gelatin coatings were added to the bite-sized cubes to help prevent them from crumbling, and simpler rehydration methods were developed. The menus were also expanded to include items such as shrimp cocktail, chicken and vegetables, toast squares, butterscotch pudding, and apple juice.

The crew of Gemini 3 snuck a corned beef sandwich on their spaceflight. Mission Commander Gus Grissom loved corned beef sandwiches, so Pilot John Young brought one along, having been encouraged by fellow astronaut Walter Schirra. However, Young was supposed to eat only approved food, and Grissom was not supposed to eat anything at all. Floating crumbs from the bread posed a potential problem, causing Grissom to put the sandwich away and the astronauts were mildly rebuked by NASA for the act. A congressional hearing was called, forcing NASA deputy administrator George Mueller to promise no repeats, and NASA employed renewed vigilance regarding what astronauts brought along on future missions.

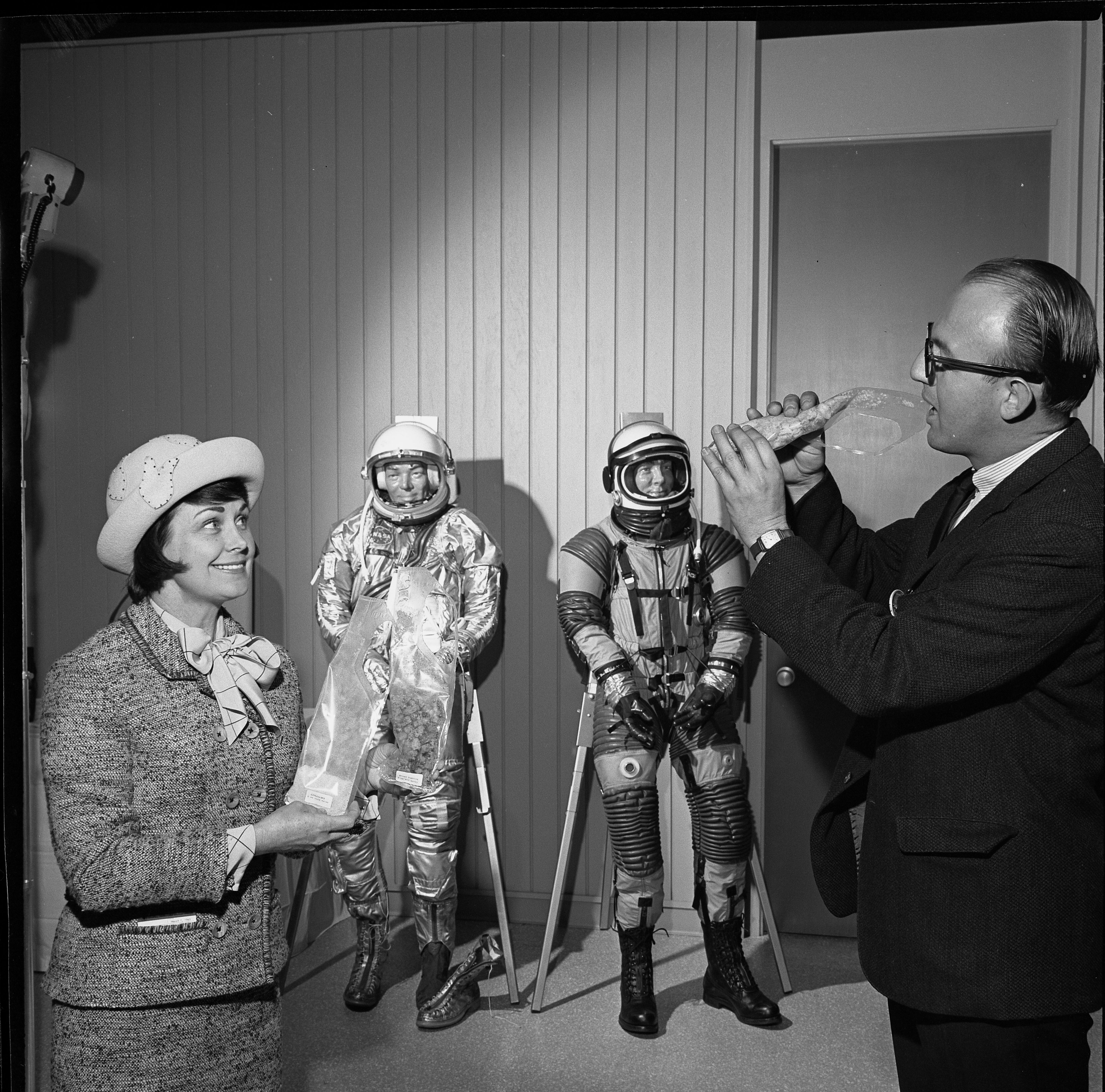
Frank J. Roberts, Apollo engineer demonstrating how astronauts eat to ARCS treasurer, Marion DeFore, Calif., 1965

Prior to the Apollo program (1968–1975), early space food development was conducted at the United States Air Force School of Aerospace Medicine and the Natick Army Labs. The variety of food options continued to expand for the Apollo missions, as the new availability of hot water made rehydrating freeze-dried foods simpler and produced a more appetizing result. This was an important aspect during the Apollo missions, since astronauts would be spending longer amounts of time in space. Appetizing foods would increase the crew's chances of maintaining proper nutrition, and the "spoon-bowl" allowed more normal eating practices. Food could be kept in special plastic zip-closure containers, and moisture allowed the food to stick to a spoon. However, the lack of taste was an issue at that time, as the food was prepared with very few spices to avoid overstimulating the gastrointestinal system. Thus, the astronauts were always looking for something that had a little more taste; Apollo 17 moonwalker Harrison Schmitt's favorite food was the bacon squares, while Buzz Aldrin enjoyed the shrimp and Paul J. Weitz went for the ice cream. In the later Apollo missions, foods were improved to make use of retort pouches and cans. This allowed the food to be thermally stabilized, enabling it to be stored for longer durations of time.

=== Apollo 11 (1969) ===
Buzz Aldrin partook of the Presbyterian Christian sacrament of Holy Communion on the Moon. It had been consecrated by his pastor, the Rev. Dean Woodruff, two weeks prior to the space mission.

"I poured the wine into the chalice our church had given me. In the one-sixth gravity of the moon, the wine curled slowly and gracefully up the side of the cup. It was interesting to think that the very first liquid ever poured on the moon, and the first food eaten there, were communion elements." —Buzz Aldrin

Aldrin received the Eucharist in the same hour that his local church did on that Sunday Sabbath and he later stated that "I sensed especially strongly my unity with our church back home, and with the Church everywhere".

=== Skylab (1973–1974) ===
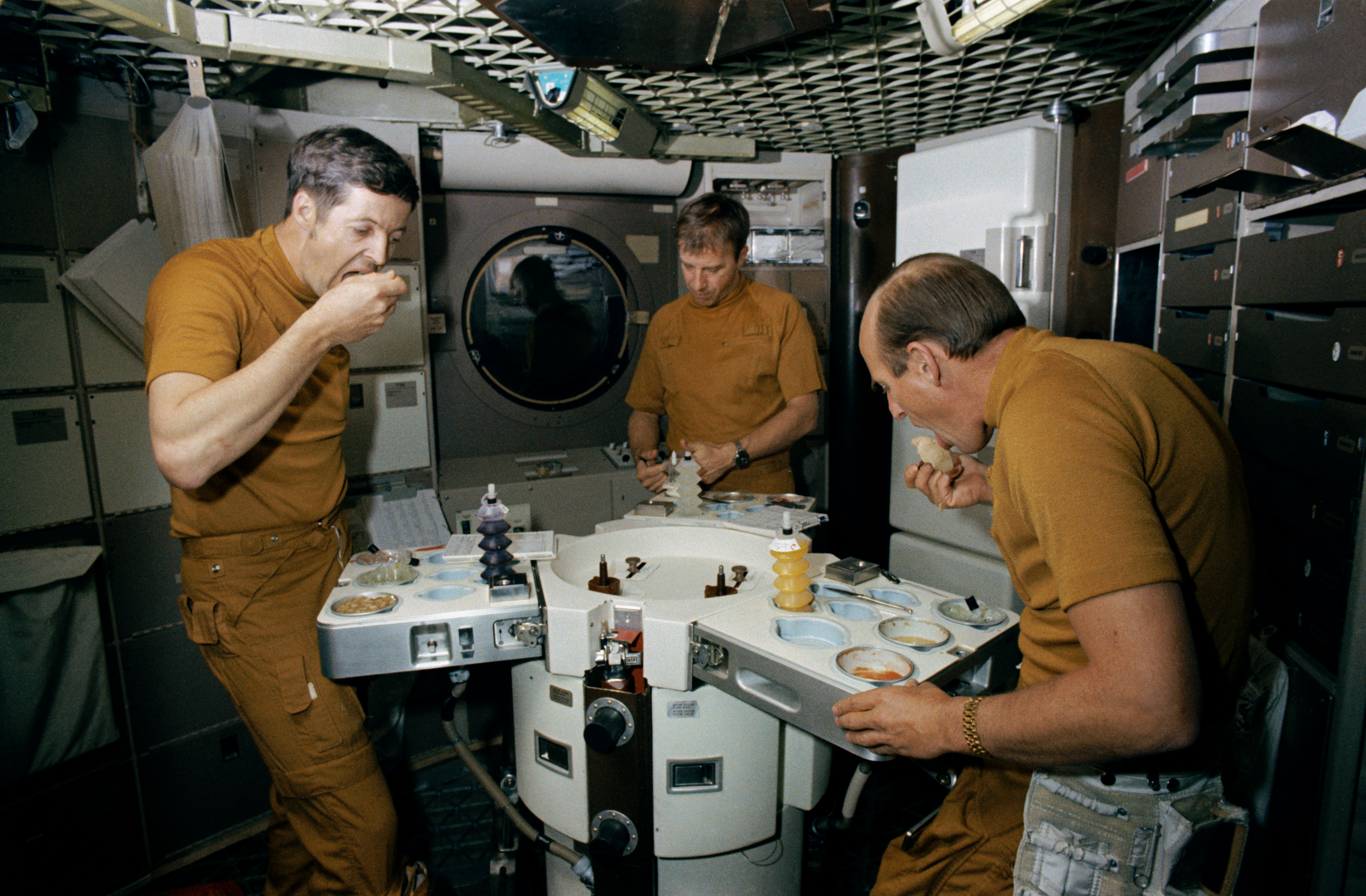
Skylab 2 crew eats food during ground training.

Larger living areas on the Skylab space station (1973–1974) allowed for an on-board refrigerator and freezer. This allowed perishable and frozen items to be stored, making microgravity the primary obstacle of future missions. When Skylab's solar panels were damaged during its launch and the station had to rely on minimal power from the Apollo Telescope Mount until Skylab 2 crewmembers performed repairs, the refrigerator and freezer were among the systems that Mission Control kept operational. The Orbital Work Shop (OWS) module had a specially designed wardroom dedicated for food preparation and dining (see image on the right).

A dining table was also available, and was designed to avoid hierarchical positions through its triangular layout and to support social cohesion. The table and chairs were fastened to the floor and fitted with foot and thigh restraints, allowing for a more normal eating experience. The trays used could warm the food, and had magnets to hold eating utensils and scissors used for opening food containers. It could accommodate all three crew members at the same time using a variety of microgravity restraints. As a result of the improved eating arrangement, astronauts aboard Skylab maintained some of the best nutritional intake recorded.

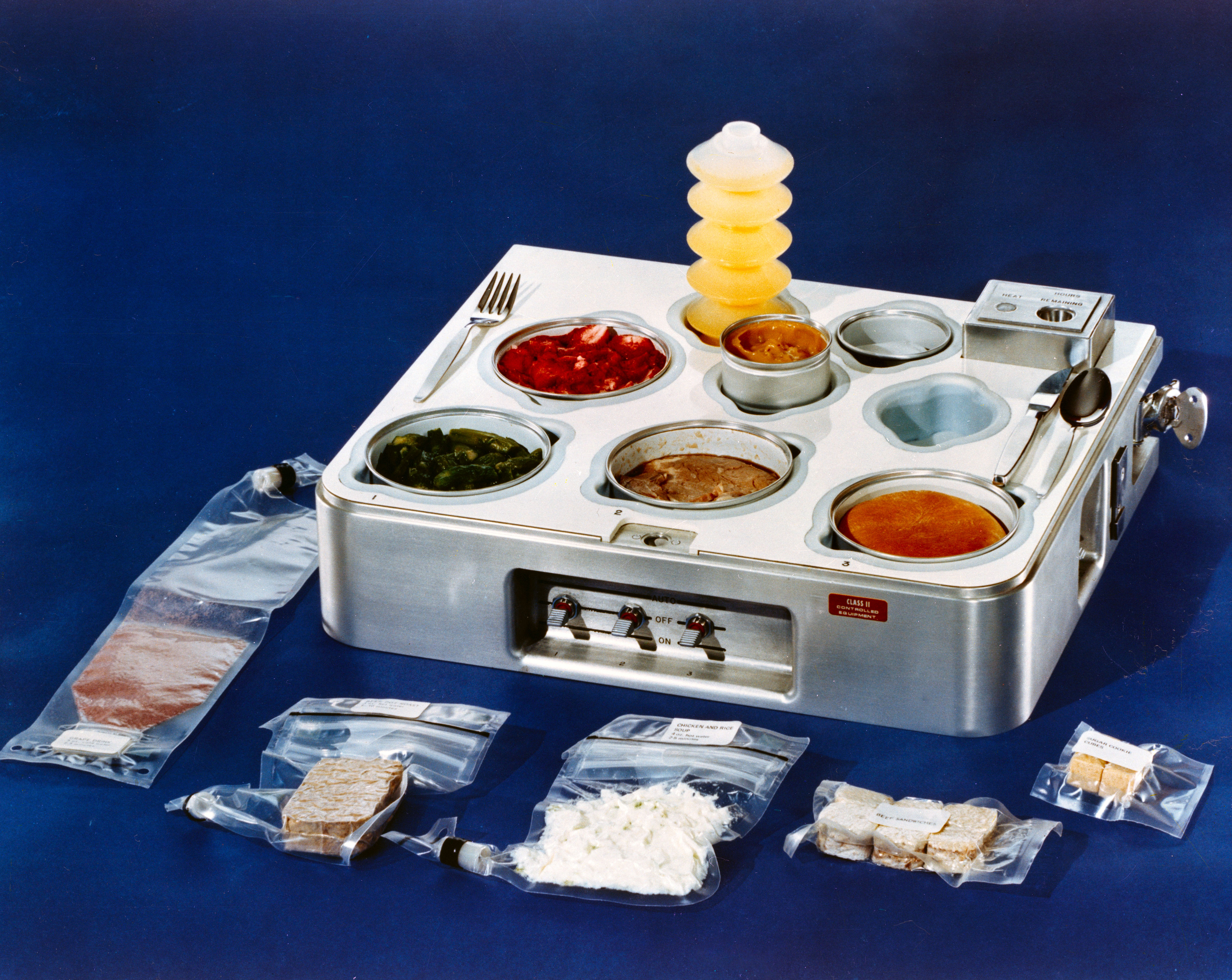
Skylab food heating and serving tray

Menus included 72 items; for the first time about 15% was frozen. Shrimp cocktail and butter cookies were consistent favorites; Lobster Newberg, fresh bread, processed meat products, and ice cream were among other choices. The food was similar to that used for Apollo, but were sealed in cans for preservation. The crew found it to be better than that of Apollo but still unsatisfying, partially due to food tasting different in space than on Earth. The frozen foods were the most popular, and they enjoyed spicy foods due to sinus congestion from weightlessness dulling their senses of taste and smell. Weightlessness also complicated the process of both eating and cleaning up, with crews spending up to 90 minutes a day on housekeeping.

At the request of astronauts, NASA included cream sherry for one Skylab mission and packaged some for testing on a reduced-gravity aircraft. In microgravity, smells quickly permeate the environment and the agency found that the sherry triggered the gag reflex. Concern over public reaction to taking alcohol into space led NASA to abandon its plans. The astronauts instead drank the purchased supply while consuming their pre-mission special diet.

The astronauts of the Apollo–Soyuz Test Project (1975) received samples of Soviet space food when the combined crew dined together. Among the foods provided by Soyuz 19 were canned beef tongue, packaged Riga bread, tubes of borscht (beet soup), and caviar. The borscht was labeled "vodka".

=== Salyut (1971–1986) ===
The Soviet Union's Salyut stations were the first to be structured in zones for different activities, including a table for work and having dinner together. By the mid-1970s, cosmonauts on the Russian Salyut space research stations were able to eat fresh food such as tomatoes, coriander, and cucumbers from their orbital space gardens, and some even had the possibility of a sip of wine or vodka with their food. The pioneering Oasis greenhouse on Salyut 1 (launched in April 1971) led to the implementation of plant-growing facilities on the later Salyut stations, on Mir and on the International Space Station, and the first space-grown vegetables were reportedly eaten in 1975 onboard Salyut 4.

=== Interkosmos (1978–1988) ===
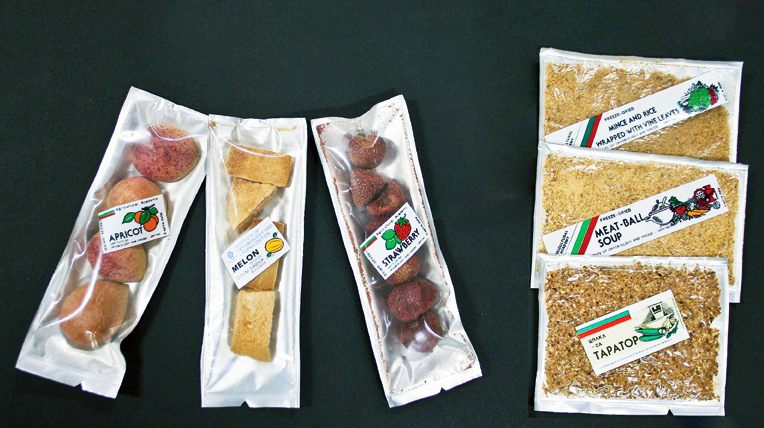
Bulgarian space food

As part of the Interkosmos space program, allies of the Soviet Union, including the People's Republic of Bulgaria, actively participated in the research and deployment of space technologies from the 1960s until the end of communism in 1989-1990 in the Eastern Bloc. The Institute of Cryobiology and Lyophilization (now the Institute of Cryobiology and Food Technology), founded in 1973 as a part of the Bulgarian Academy of Sciences, produced space food for the purposes of the program. The menu includes traditional Bulgarian dishes such as tarator, sarma, musaka, lyutenitza, kiselo mlyako, dried vegetables and fruits, etc.

== Today ==
=== International Space Station ===
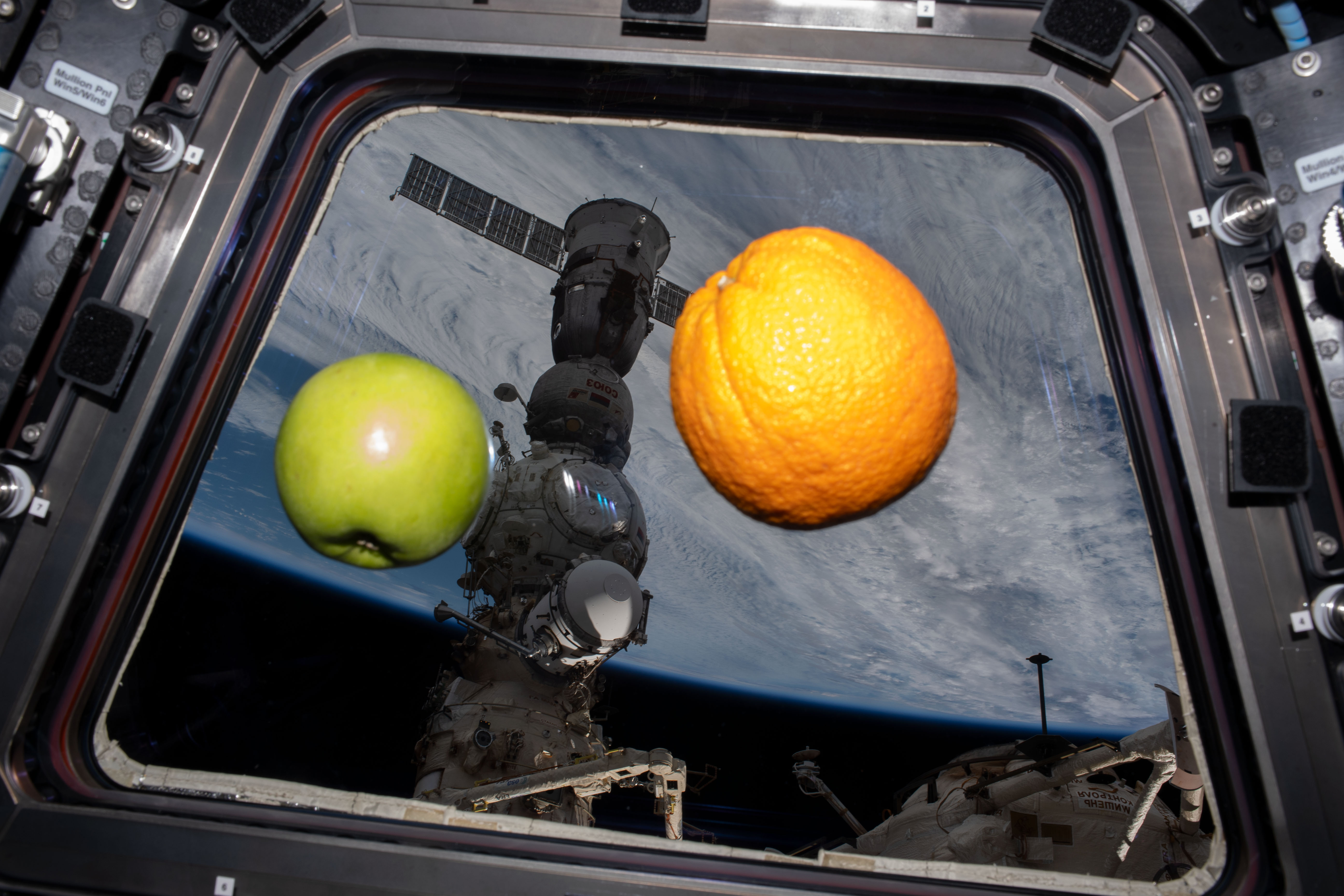
Apple and orange aboard ISS

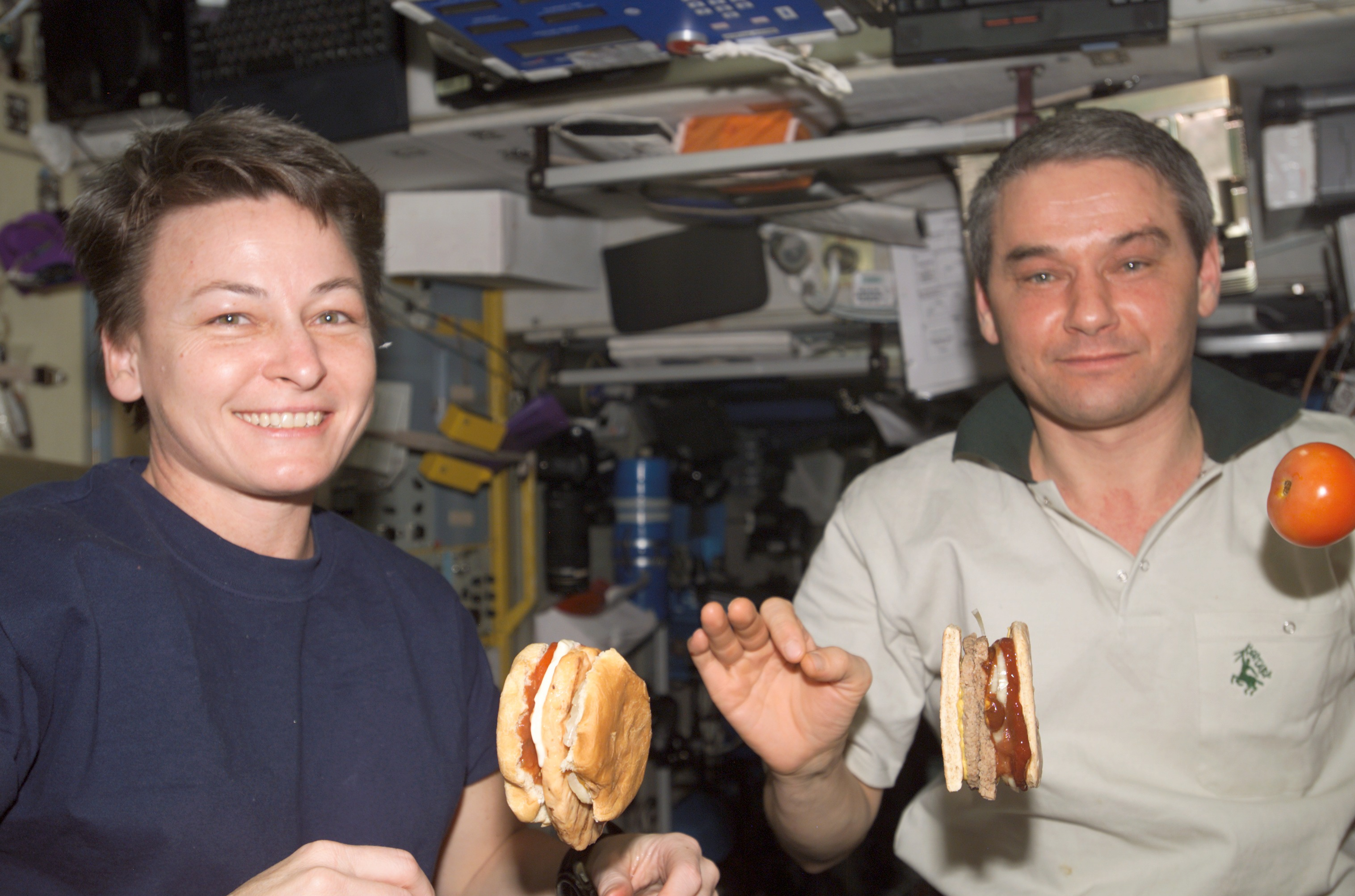
Astronauts making and eating hamburgers on board the ISS in 2002

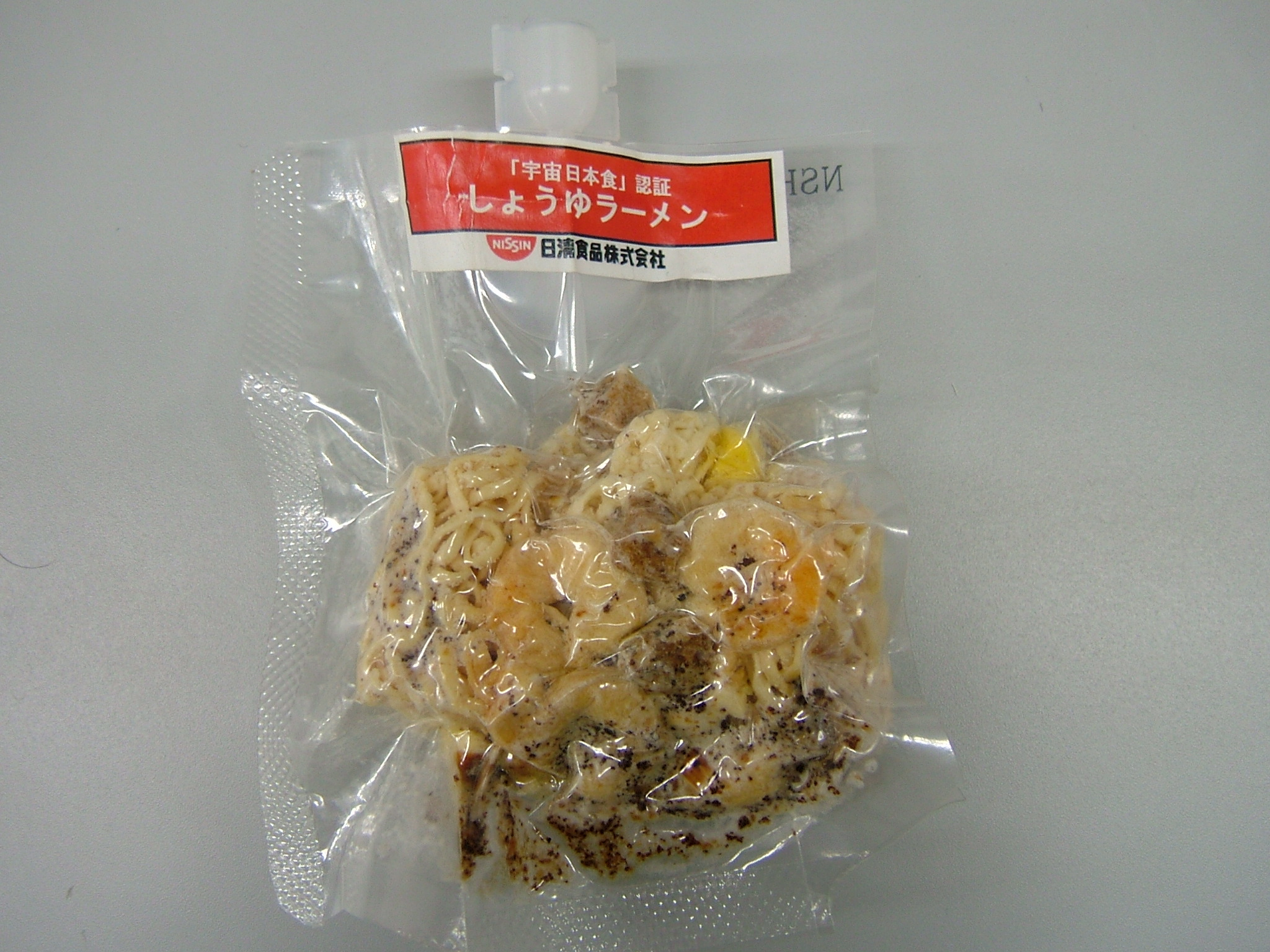
Rehydratable Shōyu flavored Japanese ramen noodles used in JAXA missions, manufactured by Nissin

What Do Astronauts Eat In Space?

NASA's aim for food on the ISS is to make the experience as close as possible to that of Earth, and they aim to provide more acceptable and palatable foods. Modern astronauts have a greater variety of main courses to choose from and many astronauts request personalized menus from lists of available foods including items like fruit salad and spaghetti. Fresh fruits and vegetables that can be safely stored at room temperature are eaten on space flights. Astronauts sometimes request beef jerky for flights, as it has an extended shelf life and a strong flavor. Food on the ISS is similar to the Shuttle, in that it is individually packaged to allow for exchanges and prevent issues in the microgravity environment. Due to the limited water supply, an emphasis has been placed on thermostabilized foods rather than rehydration methods.

Since 2002, the small LADA Greenhouse system (the leaf chamber is just 16 x 20 x 26 cm/6 x 8 x 10 inches) has been used on board the International Space Station to study how plants grow in microgravity and to grow edible vegetables for the astronauts. LADA includes a control module and was sent to the station already equipped with the root media for the plants to be grown and eaten in space.

- Canada: In 2007 the Canadian Space Agency developed Canasnack, bite-sized oatmeal cookies, made solely of Canadian ingredients. It came in five different flavors: cranberry cream, blueberry cream, maple cream, honey biscuit with blueberry cream, and sweet and salty blueberry cream. However, it proved too expensive and laborious to produce so it was discontinued a few years later.
- Italy: On 3 May 2015, Italian astronaut Samantha Cristoforetti became the first person to drink freshly brewed coffee in space. Commercial firms Lavazza and Argotec developed an espresso machine, called ISSpresso, for the International Space Station. It can also brew other hot drinks, such as tea, hot chocolate, and broth. While the device serves as a quality-of-life improvement aboard the station, it is also an experiment in fluid dynamics in space. The brewing machine and drinking cups were specially designed to work with fluids in low gravity.
- Japan: The Japan Aerospace Exploration Agency (JAXA) have developed traditional Japanese foods and drinks such as matcha, yōkan, ramen, sushi, soups, and rice with ume for consumption in orbit. The foods have been produced in collaboration with Japanese food companies such as Ajinomoto, Meiji Dairies, and Nissin Foods.
- South Korea: In April 2008, South Korea's first astronaut, Yi So-yeon, was a crew member on the International Space Station and brought a modified version of South Korea's national dish, kimchi. It took three research institutes several years and over one million dollars in funding to create a version of the fermented cabbage dish that was suitable for space travel.
- Russia: On the International Space Station, the Russian crew has a selection of over 300 dishes. An example daily menu can consist of:
  - Breakfast: curds and nuts, mashed potatoes with nuts, apple-quince chip sticks, sugarless coffee, and vitamins
  - Lunch: jellied pike perch, borscht with meat, goulash with buckwheat, bread, black currant juice, sugarless tea
  - Supper: rice and meat, broccoli and cheese, nuts, tea with sugar
  - Second supper: dried beef, cashew nuts, peaches, grape juice
- Sweden: Swedish astronaut Christer Fuglesang was not allowed to bring reindeer jerky with him on board a shuttle mission as it was "weird" for the Americans so soon before Christmas. He had to go with moose instead.
- France: In April 2021 French astronaut Thomas Pesquet brought with him on SpaceX Crew-2 a few signature French dishes to share with his fellow astronauts: space safe version of beef bourguignon, einkorn risotto, and crêpe Suzette.
- Poland: Specially for IGNIS, the first Polish mission to the International Space Station, scheduled for spring 2025 and featuring ESA project astronaut Dr. Sławosz Uznański-Wiśniewski, the commercial company LYOFOOD, in collaboration with the European Space Agency, developed a Bonus Food menu of freeze-dried signature Polish meals. The menu includes pierogi stuffed with cabbage and mushrooms, tomato soup with noodles, Polish “leczo” stew with buckwheat, and apple crumble for dessert. The recipes for the first three dishes were developed by renowned Polish chef and restaurateur Mateusz Gessler, while the apple crumble was selected from LYOFOOD’s dessert offerings. Usually, freeze-dried food rehydrates by absorbing added water. Pierogi, however, require complete immersion, followed by the removal of excess liquid—a significant technological challenge both in terms of the freeze-drying process and the preparation of the dish on board the ISS. While hot water can be added from a dispenser, there is no way to dispose of the leftover liquid. To solve this, freeze-dried vegetable broth was added to the pouch, allowing astronauts to first drink the broth in which the pierogi rehydrated and then enjoy the main dish.

NASA's Advanced Food Technology Project (AFT) is researching ways to ensure an adequate food supply for long-duration space exploration missions. This research is primarily focused on mitigating the adverse health effects caused by long duration spaceflight. The impact to health can include symptoms such as weight loss, dehydration, a reduction in red blood cell count, constipation and electrolyte imbalances. The Advanced Food Technology Project aims to develop space foods that minimize these adverse effects.

=== Chinese space program ===
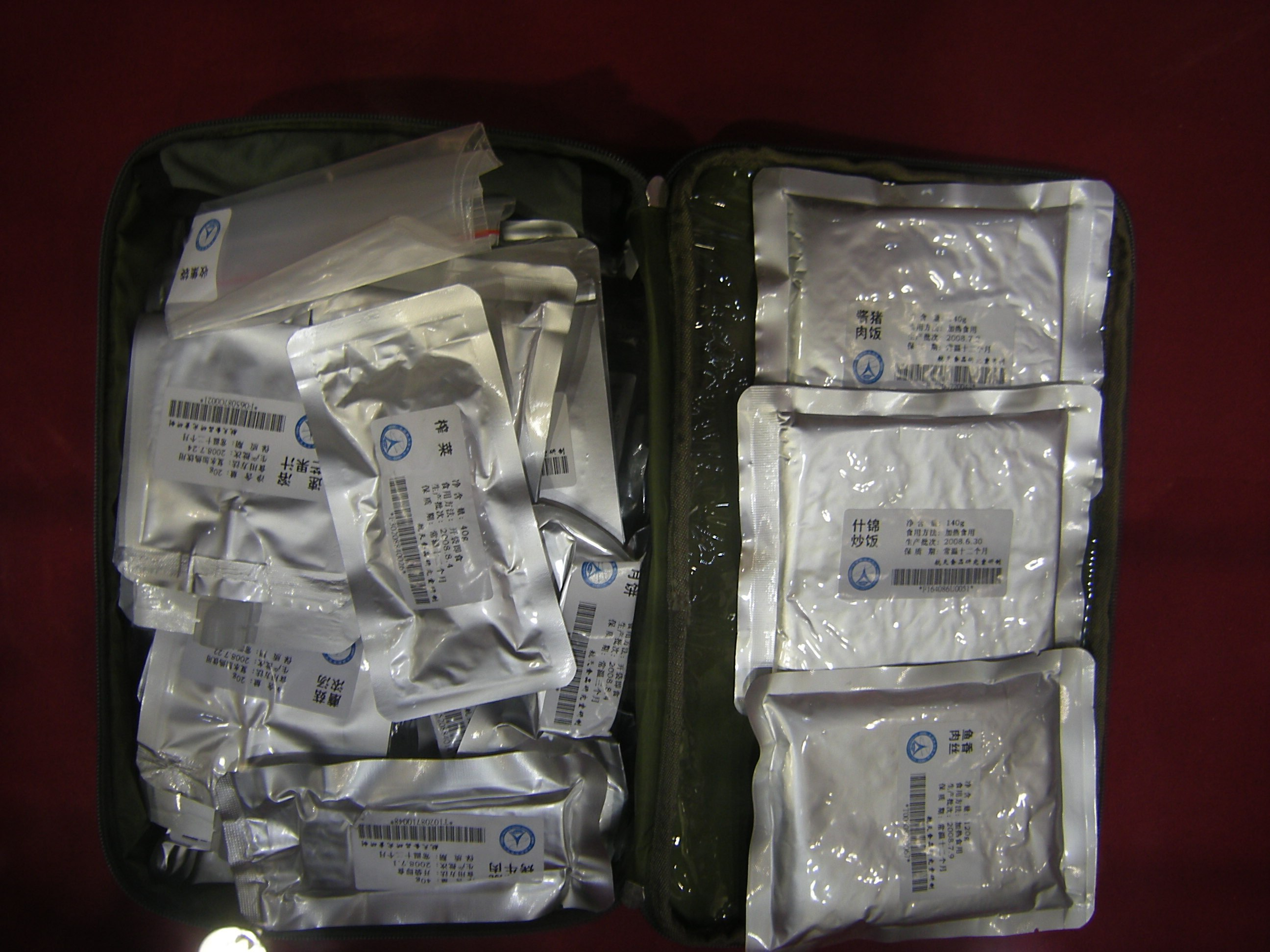
Chinese astronaut food packs for the Shenzhou 7 mission (see details page for label translation)

In October 2003, the People's Republic of China commenced its first crewed spaceflight, Shenzhou 5. The astronaut, Yang Liwei, brought along with him and ate specially processed yuxiang pork (Chinese: 鱼香肉丝), Kung Pao chicken (Chinese: 宫保鸡丁), and Eight Treasures rice (Chinese: 八宝饭), along with Chinese herbal tea. Food made for this flight and the subsequent crewed flight in 2007 has been commercialized for sale to the mass market.

At Tiangong space station, meals consisting of 120 different types of food, selected based on astronauts' preferences, are stored aboard. Staples including shredded pork in garlic sauce, kung pao chicken, black pepper beef, yuxiang shredded pork, pickled cabbage, and beverages, including a variety of teas and juices, are resupplied by trips of the Tianzhou-class robotic cargo spacecraft. Fresh fruits and vegetables are stored in coolers. Huang Weifen, the chief astronaut trainer of CMSA, explains that most of the food is prepared to be solid, boneless, and in small pieces. Condiments such as pork sauce and Sichuan pepper sauce are used to compensate for the changes in the sense of taste in microgravity. Food items are often adjusted according to astronauts' feedback, such as when larger supplies of vegetables were included in Tianzhou 4.

Additionally, China's Tiangong-2 station has conducted experiments growing food on board in a micro-gravity environment, such as thale cress, a form of edible weed, as well as rice. The station also hosts Silkworms - an experiment devised by students to see if they can be used as a source of protein on long-duration space missions.

=== Future long duration missions ===
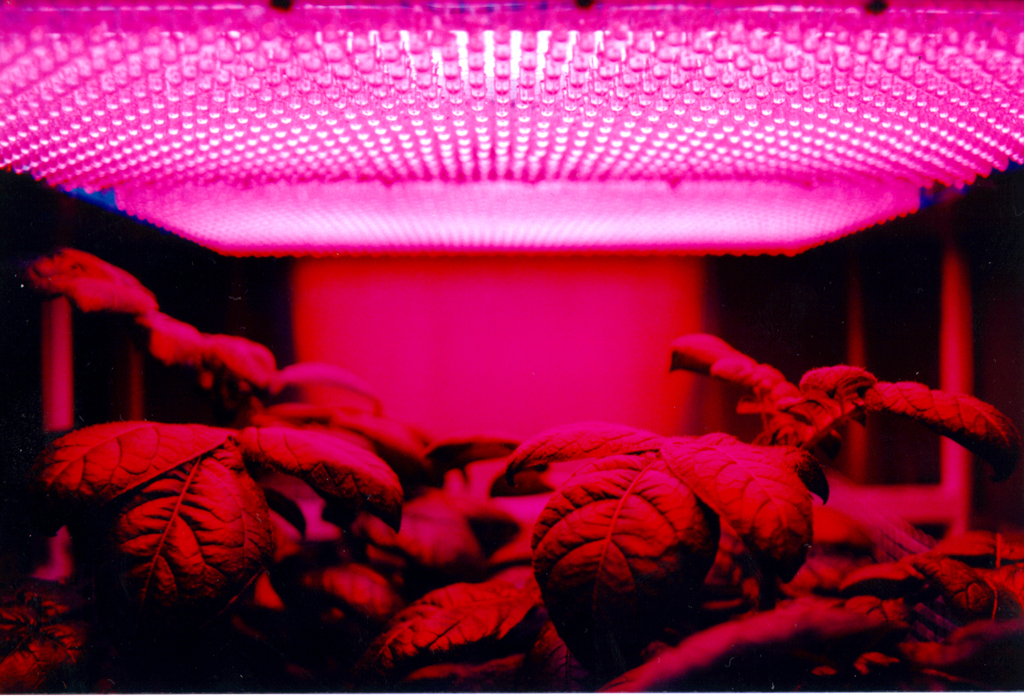
Red LED grow lights illuminate potato plants in a NASA study on growing food in space.

Lots of work is currently being done to develop food and packaging solutions suitable for long duration space missions (2.5 y+). The primary goal is to provide palatable and nutritious food for astronauts, with the additional consideration of minimising volume, mass and waste.

A key consideration is minimising the waste produced during long duration missions. The importance of biodegradable, edible and reusable packaging solutions have been emphasised, as these will reduce the strain on the solid-waste management system. Maximising the shelf life of foods has also been proposed, further helping to reduce waste.

Research is also being conducted on food systems for lunar and planetary surface missions. A large focus is currently on crop processing, with the aim that crops grown hydroponically will constitute the majority of the menu. Initial crop ideas include white and sweet potatoes, soybeans, wheat and rice. A secondary benefit is the facilitating of production and regulation of oxygen and carbon dioxide.

A focus is being placed on ensuring astronauts receive not only the recommended levels of nutrients to support mental and physical health, but the correct amounts required for long duration spaceflight. Research has shown that nutritional requirements change with the amount of time spent in space. For example, the recommended amount of calcium is 1000 mg/day, rising to 1200 mg/day in long duration missions.

== Consumer derivatives ==
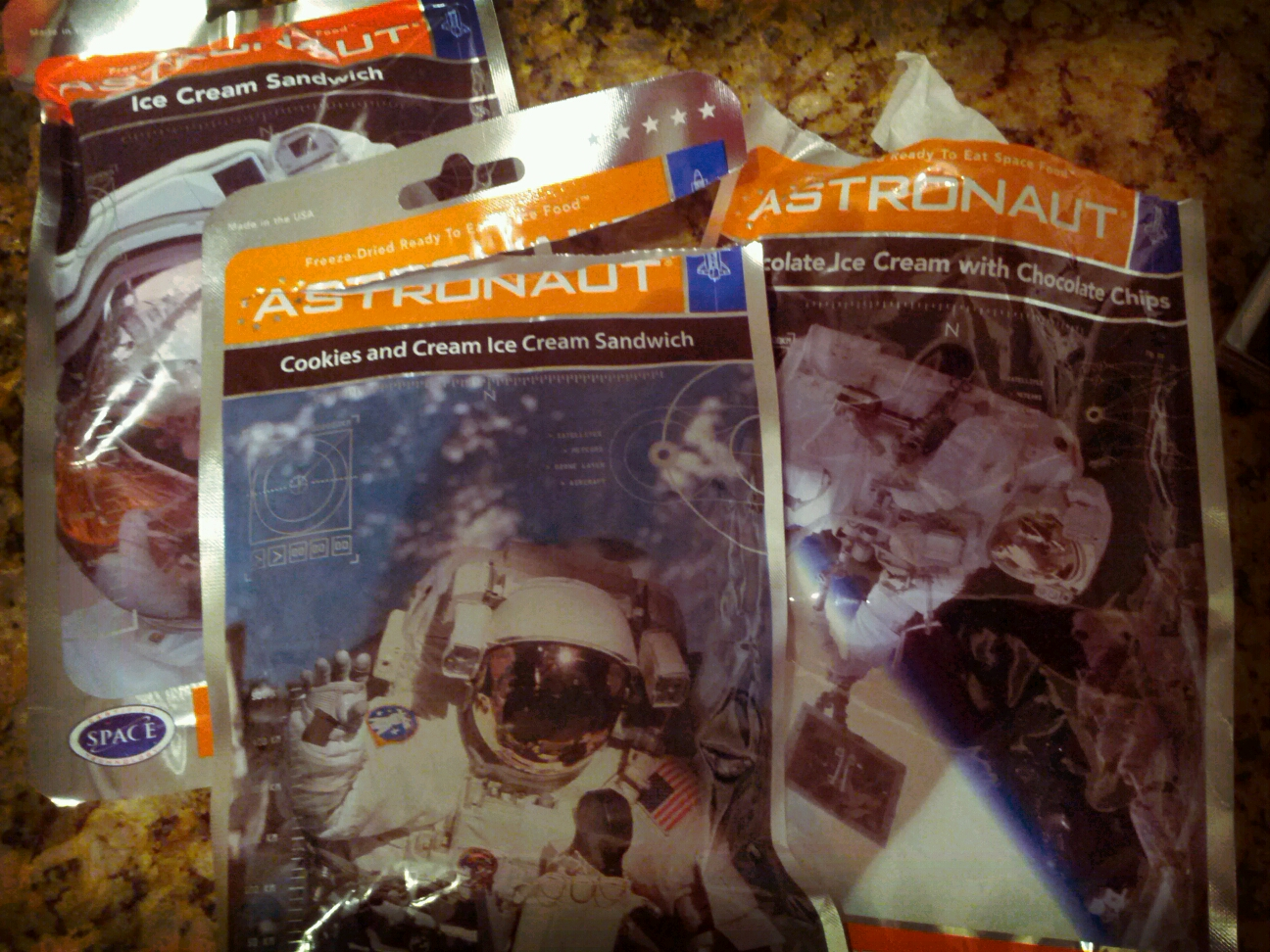
Selection of freeze dried ice cream sandwiches

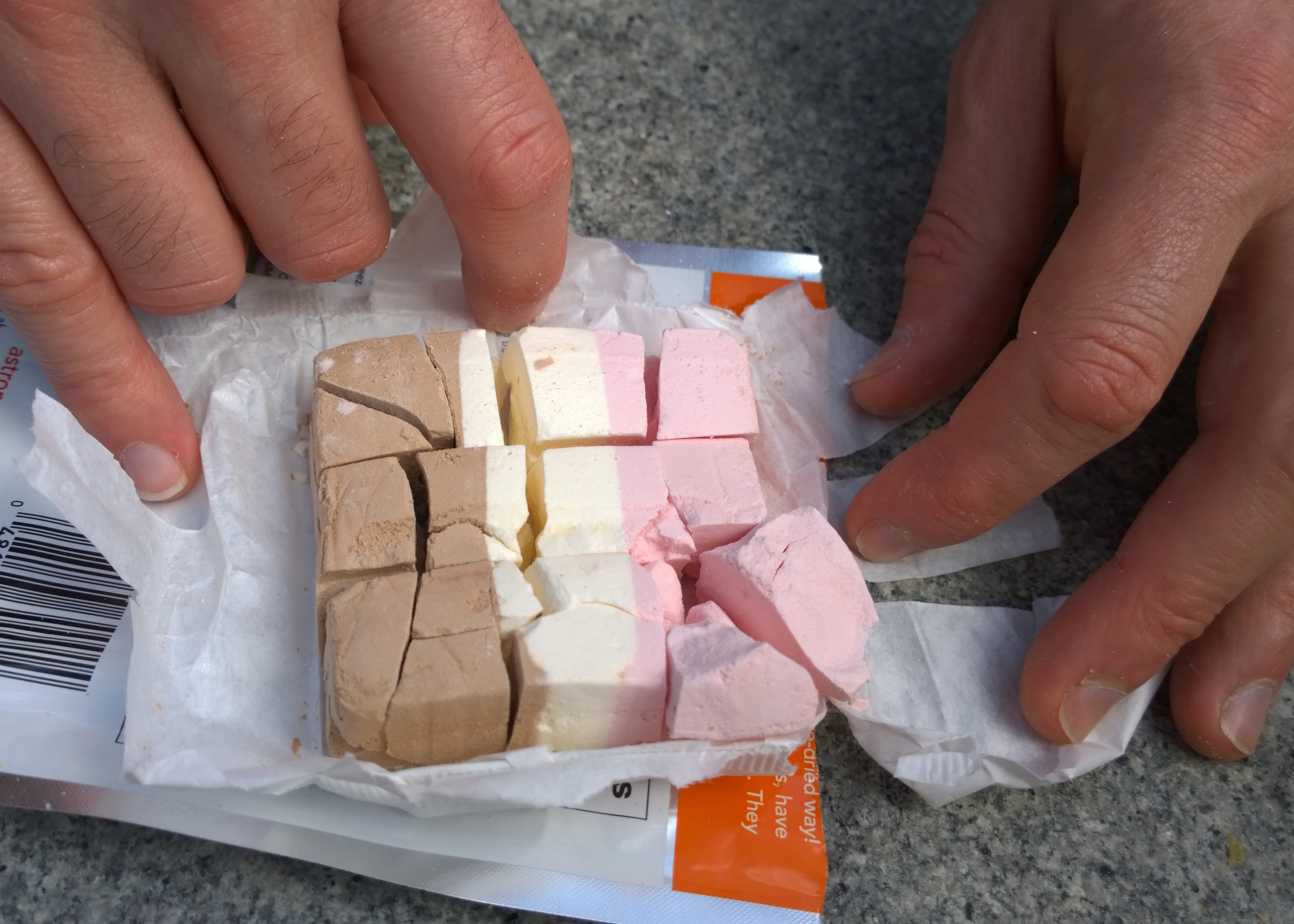
Commercially sold freeze dried ice cream

Capitalizing on the popularity of the Apollo space missions in the early 1970s, Pillsbury marketed "Food Sticks" (also known as "Space Food Sticks") for the consumer market. Fourteen individually packaged sticks were included in a box, and came in six flavors such as peanut butter, caramel, and chocolate. Food Sticks were marketed as a "nutritionally balanced between meal snack". Examples of derivative products can be found in NASA Space Center gift shops, general sweets and novelty shops, online retailers, or at Army Surplus stores. A popular example is freeze-dried ice cream. Tang, originally marketed in 1959, saw an increase in popularity in the 1960s due to its inclusion on American human space flights.

== See also ==
- Airline meal
- Alcohol and spaceflight
- HI-SEAS
- Meal, Ready-to-Eat
