= Space Food Sticks =

Snack associated with NASA

Space Food Sticks were snacks created for the Pillsbury Company in the late 1960s by the company's chief food technologist, Howard Bauman. Bauman was instrumental later in establishing the Hazard Analysis and Critical Control Points regulations used for food safety.

Bauman and his team were instrumental in creating the first solid food consumed by a NASA astronaut: small food cubes eaten by Scott Carpenter on board Aurora 7 in 1962. (John Glenn had consumed the fruit-flavored drink Tang in space three months earlier aboard the Friendship 7.) Space food cubes were followed by other space-friendly foods created by Pillsbury's food engineers, such as non-crumbly cake, relish that could be served in slices, and meat that needed no refrigeration.

In 1970, Pillsbury filed for a trademark for a "non-frozen balance energy snack in rod form containing nutritionally balanced amounts of carbohydrate, fat and protein" which they dubbed "Space Food Sticks". (No basis for use of the term "nutritionally balanced" was provided.) A forerunner of energy bars, Space Food Sticks were promoted by Pillsbury for their association with NASA's efforts to create safe, healthy and nutritional space food. Capitalizing on the popularity of the Apollo space missions, Pillsbury marketed Space Food Sticks as a "nutritionally balanced between-meal snack." Fourteen individually packaged sticks were included in a box, and came in six flavors such as peanut butter, caramel, and chocolate. In 1972, astronauts on board Skylab 3 ate modified versions of Space Food Sticks to test their "gastrointestinal compatibility".

Space Food Sticks disappeared from North American supermarket shelves in the 1980s. They were revived by Retrofuture Products, of Port Washington, NY in 2006. Two flavors, chocolate and peanut butter, were released. They were sold at flight museums such as the Kennedy Space Center and the Smithsonian Air & Space Museum as well as online until production stopped in 2014.

In Australia, Space Food Sticks were produced for many years in fewer flavor varieties than the American versions (chocolate and caramel only). They were marketed initially under the White Wings brand, and later the Nestlé Starz brand, to modern-day Australian children as an energy food. Production stopped in 2014, apart from a very brief reappearance in 2019 to commemorate the fiftieth anniversary of the Apollo 11 Moon landing.

== Popular culture ==
Space Food Sticks have shown up in popular culture including TV series The Simpsons, God, the Devil and Bob, and The Colbert Report, the books of R.L. Stine, and the film Super 8. They are frequently cited as the favorite snack of Australian Olympic gold medal winner Ian Thorpe.
