= Dare Foods =

Canadian food manufacturer

Dare Foods, Limited
- The Dare Foods logo
- Type: Private
- Industry: Food processing
- Founded: 1919; 107 years ago, in Kitchener, Ontario, Canada
- Headquarters: Kitchener, Ontario, Canada
- Products: Cookies; Crackers
- Website: www.darefoods.com

Dare Foods, Limited is a Canadian food manufacturing company. They have seven factories in Canada and the United States. Their products are distributed in North America and in more than 50 other countries.

== Company history ==
In 1892, the founder of Dare Foods, Charles H. Doerr, began making and selling cookies and candies in a small grocery shop in Berlin, Ontario, Canada. By 1919, Doerr had created the C.H. Doerr Company, which distributed his goods throughout Ontario. Following Charles's death in 1941, the company was led by his twenty-four-year-old grandson Carl Doerr. Carl had been raised by his paternal grandparents after both his parents died of the Spanish flu.

On February 16, 1943, a fire destroyed the company's factory at Weber and Breithaupt in Kitchener, killing nightwatchman Julius Eckstein and risking the future of the company, then known as C.H. Doerr Co. Ltd. Carl quickly moved to rebuild, relocating the same year as the fire to a plot of land on what is today Kingsway Drive in Kitchener.

The name of the company was changed to "Dare" in 1945 because it was easier to pronounce. Dare products became more popular Canada-wide by 1954, and began to be exported to the U.S. in 1956.

== Products ==
Dare is known for adopting the resealable "tin tie" packaging for their cookies in 1954. The resealable bag ensured freshness and soon became the standard packaging for cookies across Canada.

Dare has declared all of its facilities to be "peanut free". Partial product list:

- Maple Leaf Crème Cookies
- Ultimate Coconut Crème Cookies
- Bear Paws
- Viva Puffs
- Whippets
- Wagon Wheels
- Breton Crackers
- Vinta Crackers
- RealFruit Gummies and RealFruit Minis
- Maxi Fruit
- Melba toast
- Breaktime Chocolate Chip Cookies
- Bear Paws Cereal and Fruit
- Bear Paws Crackers
- Baguettes Bites
- Simple Pleasures Moments

Since 2003, they have produced Canada's Girl Guide cookies.
