= Pillsbury (brand) =

American food processing company

The Pillsbury Company

- Pillsbury Cake Mix (formerly a Smucker Co. product; now made by Hometown Food, a division of Brynwood Partners)
- Type: Public
- Traded as: NYSE: PSY; LSE: PSY
- Founded: 1869; 157 years ago, in Minneapolis, Minnesota, U.S.
- Founders: Charles Alfred Pillsbury; John S. Pillsbury
- Fate: Acquired by General Mills; assets divided
- Successor: General Mills
- Headquarters: Minneapolis, Minnesota, U.S.
- Website: www.pillsbury.com

Pillsbury (/ˈpɪlzbɛri, -bər-/ PILZ-berr-ee, -bər-) is an American brand of baking and dough products, marketed by General Mills and Hometown Food Company. Pillsbury products include refrigerated and frozen dough products, including the Toaster Strudel, marketed by General Mills; and shelf-stable flours and baking products marketed by Hometown Food Company. The brand originated in Minneapolis in 1869 with the founding of C. A. Pillsbury and Company, a flour mill on the banks of the Mississippi River.

The company, later known as the Pillsbury Company, expanded into the restaurant and frozen foods businesses in the mid-20th century, and introduced the Pillsbury Doughboy mascot in 1965. Pillsbury was acquired by British conglomerate Grand Metropolitan in 1989, which divested the restaurant businesses and sold the company to General Mills in 2001. Antitrust concerns prevented General Mills from acquiring Pillsbury's flour and cake mix product lines, which were spun off, bought by Smucker's in 2004, and sold to Brynwood Partners in 2018. Both companies use the circular blue Pillsbury logo and the Doughboy mascot.

== History ==
=== Founding and early development ===
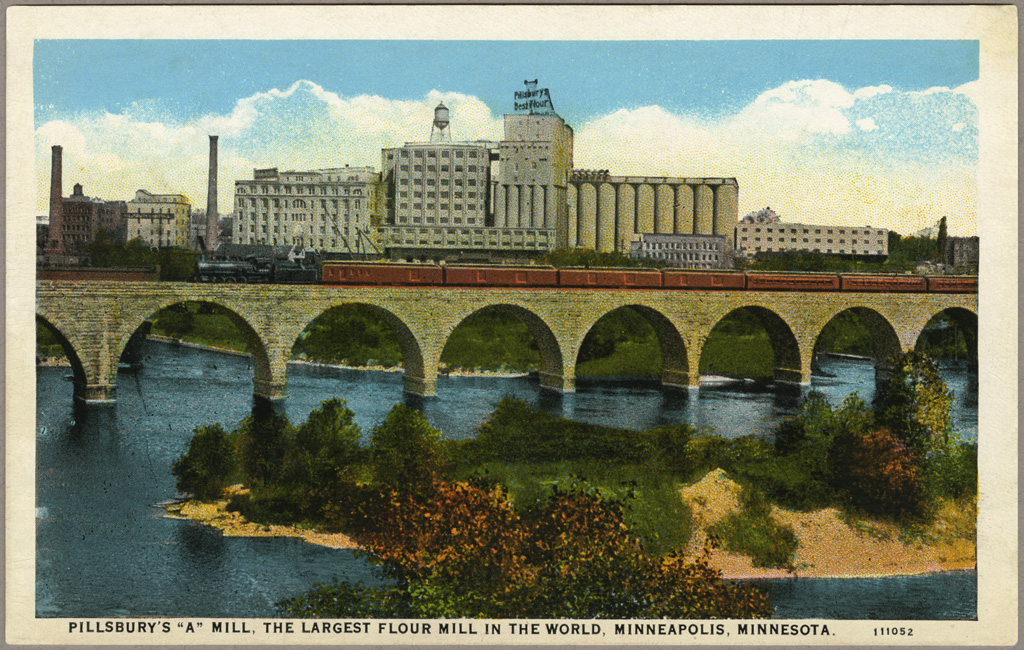
Postcard featuring Pillsbury with the caption, "the Largest Flour Mill in the World, Minneapolis, Minnesota."

C. A. Pillsbury and Company was founded in 1869 by Charles Alfred Pillsbury and his uncle John S. Pillsbury. The company was second in the United States (after Washburn-Crosby) to use steel rollers for processing grain. The finished product required transportation, so the Pillsburys assisted in funding railroad development in Minnesota.

In 1889, Pillsbury and its five mills on the banks of the Mississippi River were purchased by a British company. The company also tried to purchase and merge with the Washburn Crosby Company (a precursor of General Mills), but the principals at Washburn prevented the takeover.

In 1923, the Pillsbury family reacquired "Pillsbury-Washburn Flour Mills Company, Limited" which subsequently was incorporated in 1935 as "Pillsbury Flour Mills Company".

=== 1950s ===
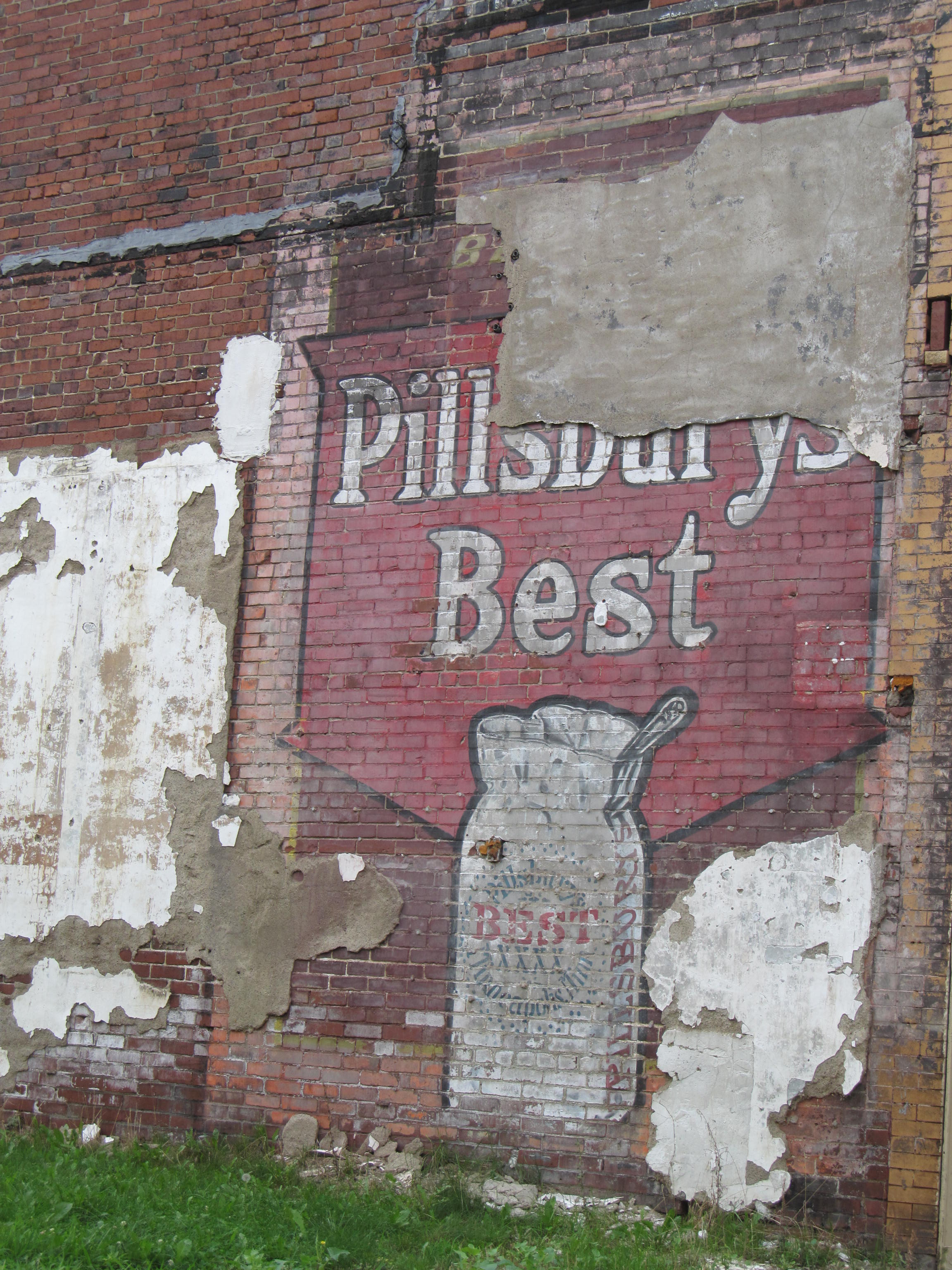
A Pillsbury ghost sign in New Kensington, Pennsylvania

In 1949, the company introduced a national baking competition, which came to be known as the Pillsbury Bake-Off; it was nationally broadcast on CBS for many years and resulted in a series of successful cookbooks that helped market Pillsbury brands.

Only seven products used the Pillsbury name in 1950, but the company began adding to its product line. In 1951 they acquired Ballard & Ballard Company, and 1957 brought the beginning of packaged biscuit dough, which would become one of the company's most important and profitable product lines in later decades.The company began advertising heavily on television. In 1957, Pillsbury commissioned a TV commercial jingle (from its advertising agency Leo Burnett) with the main lyrics "Nothin' says lovin/Like somethin' from the oven/And Pillsbury says it best". The jingle became a well-known signature of the company and was used, with modifications, for at least 20 years.

Later corporate acquisitions included restaurants such as Burger King, Steak and Ale, Bennigan's, Godfather's Pizza, Häagen-Dazs, and Quik Wok, plus popular grocery store food brands such as Green Giant.

=== 1960s–1970s ===
Advertising company Leo Burnett created Pillsbury's Doughboy in 1965.

In the 1960s, Pillsbury added Sweet* 10 made with cyclamate, which became the most popular artificial sweetener. In 1964, Pillsbury introduced Funny Face Drink Mix with the names Goofy Grape, Rootin' Tootin' Raspberry, Freckle Face Strawberry, Loud Mouth Lime, Chinese Cherry (later Choo-Choo Cherry), and Injun Orange (later Jolly Olly Orange). Lefty Lemon followed in 1965, along with other flavors. The Funny Face characters, as well as the Funny Face brand were created in 1963 by Hal Silverman, a Creative Director at Campbell Mithun Advertising. When cyclamate was banned, Sweet* 10 and Funny Face were eliminated, resulting in a $4.5 million loss. Both products were re-introduced after changes, and the drinks became available sweetened and unsweetened.

Another drink mix introduced in 1966 was Moo Juice, a flavored powder that when combined with milk in a shaker, produced a milkshake. Moo Juice was also created by Hal Silverman. Its TV commercial featured a talking animation of the product's cartoon cow head mascot voiced by comedian Frank Fontaine. Moo Juice was short-lived, as its milkshakes tended to be thin compared to similar products such as Borden's Frosted and Birds Eye's Thick and Frosty.

Among the other kid foods that Silverman created for Pillsbury was Nugget Town, chocolate flavored nuggets that came in eight different, collectable packages that when popped open and folded made into a whole western town. The TV commercial featured comedian Buddy Hackett as the voice of the town's little bear sheriff. Also, there was Gorilla Milk—"...you'll go ape for Gorilla Milk, a glass in the morning and you'll swing all day"—a protein additive that turned milk into an instant breakfast. This product, aimed at teenagers, was not successful going against Carnation Instant Breakfast.

That decade, Pillsbury also created Space Food Sticks to capitalize on the popularity of the space program. Space Food Sticks were developed by Robert Muller, the inventor of the HACCP standards used by the food industry to ensure food safety.

When NASA astronaut Scott Carpenter launched into space on Mercury capsule Aurora 7 in 1962, he was carrying with him the first solid space food – small food cubes developed by Pillsbury's research and development department. Taking Pillsbury scientists more than a year to develop, space food cubes were followed by other space-friendly foods, such as cake that was not crumbly, relish that could be served in slices and meat that needed no refrigeration.

Pillsbury acquired the Burger King fast food chain in 1967. Pillsbury bought out Green Giant in 1979.

=== 1980s and after ===
The Pillsbury Company bought Häagen-Dazs in 1983. Then in 1985, Pillsbury acquired Diversifoods, the largest Burger King franchisee in the U.S. and parent company of Godfather's Pizza. In 1988, Pillsbury sold the Godfather's Pizza chain to a management-led group as part of the company's restructuring moves.

In 1989, the British company Grand Metropolitan (later Diageo) purchased the food maker, and during this ownership period the company divested itself of all production and distribution facilities (contracting these functions to other companies), making itself simply a marketing entity for its own brands (Pillsbury, Green Giant, Old El Paso, Totino's, etc.) Pillsbury sold all of their restaurant brands and exited the business completely by the late 1990s. In 1999, Pillsbury and Nestlé merged their U.S. and Canadian ice cream operations into a joint venture called Ice Cream Partners.

In 2001 Nestlé exercised its contractual right to buy General Mills' interest in Ice Cream Partners, which included the right to a 99-year license for the Häagen-Dazs brand. Pursuant to that license, the Dreyer's subsidiary of Nestlé produced and marketed Häagen-Dazs products in the United States and Canada.

In 2001, Diageo sold Pillsbury to General Mills. The baking products division was sold to International Multifoods Corporation, which was later acquired by Smucker's.

== Notable achievements ==
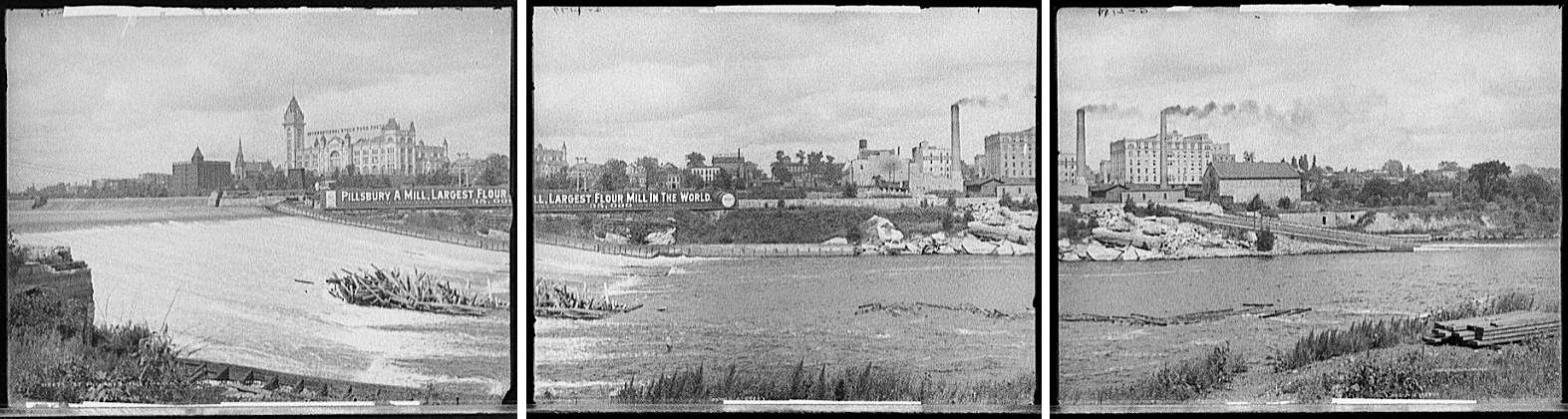
Pillsbury on the Mississippi River in 1905

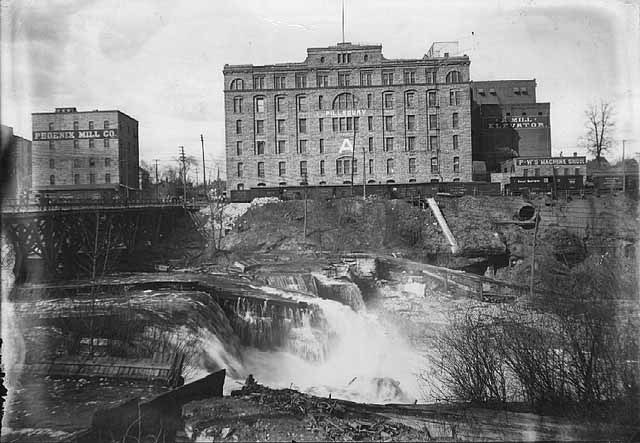
The Pillsbury "A" Mill and neighboring Phoenix Mill in the early 1900s

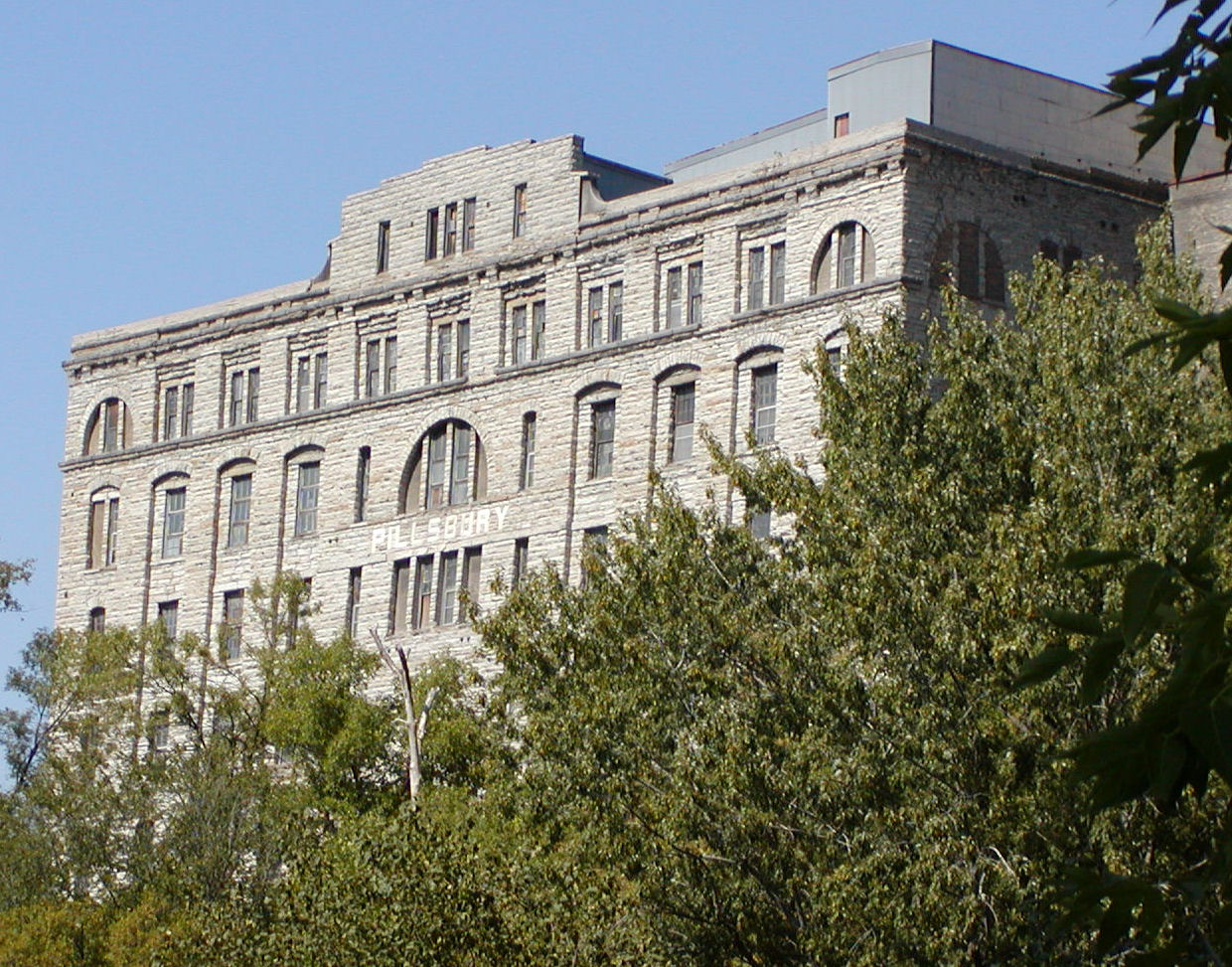
The Pillsbury "A" Mill in 2006

Pillsbury once claimed to have the largest grain mill in the world at the Pillsbury A-Mill overlooking Saint Anthony Falls on the Mississippi River in Minneapolis. The building had two of the most powerful direct-drive waterwheels ever built, each putting out 1,200 horsepower (900 kW). The Pillsbury A-Mill was converted to artist lofts by the Dominium company in 2016.

In 1960, Robert J. Keith, then Vice President of Pillsbury, published an article titled the "Marketing Revolution" in the leading marketing journal, Journal of Marketing. The article, which was based on Keith's personal recollections, set out the way that the Pillsbury Company had evolved. He pointed out that the company had shifted from a focus on production in the 1860s to sales focus in the 1930s through to a consumer focus in the 1950s. The characteristics of these three distinct eras in Pillsbury's evolution include: the production oriented era from 1869-1930s – characterized by a "focus on production processes"; the sales oriented era from the 1930s to the 1950s – characterized by investment in research to develop new products and advertising to persuade markets of product benefits and the marketing oriented era from the beginning of the 1950s – characterized by a focus on the customer's latent and existing needs.

In addition, Keith hypothesized that a marketing control era was about to emerge. Although Keith's article explicitly documented Pillsbury's evolution, the article appears to suggest that the stages observed at Pillsbury constitute a normal evolutionary path (production→sales→marketing) for most large organizations. Marketing scholars quickly picked up on Keith's evolutionary stages for marketing organizations and it was integrated into marketing texts and became "accepted wisdom". One content analysis of 25 introductory and advanced texts found that Keith's eras were reproduced in all but four.

Keith's notion of distinct eras in the evolution of marketing practice has been widely criticized described as "hopelessly flawed". Specific criticisms of Keith's tripartite periodization include that:

- It ignores historical facts about business conditions
- It mis-states the nature of supply and demand
- It cites the growth of marketing institutions

Systematic studies carried out since Keith's work have failed to replicate his periodization. Instead, other studies suggest that many companies exhibited a marketing orientation in the 19th century and that the business schools were teaching marketing decades before Pillsbury adopted a marketing-oriented approach. Jones and Richardson also investigated historical accounts of marketing practice and found evidence for both the sales and marketing era during the so-called production era and concluded that there was no "marketing revolution". Keith's eras have become known, somewhat cynically, as the standard chronology. In spite of such criticisms, Keith's descriptions of the different eras continue to influence marketing thought.

== See also ==
- Pillsbury Doughboy
