= Freeze-dried ice cream =

Ice cream with its water removed by freeze-drying

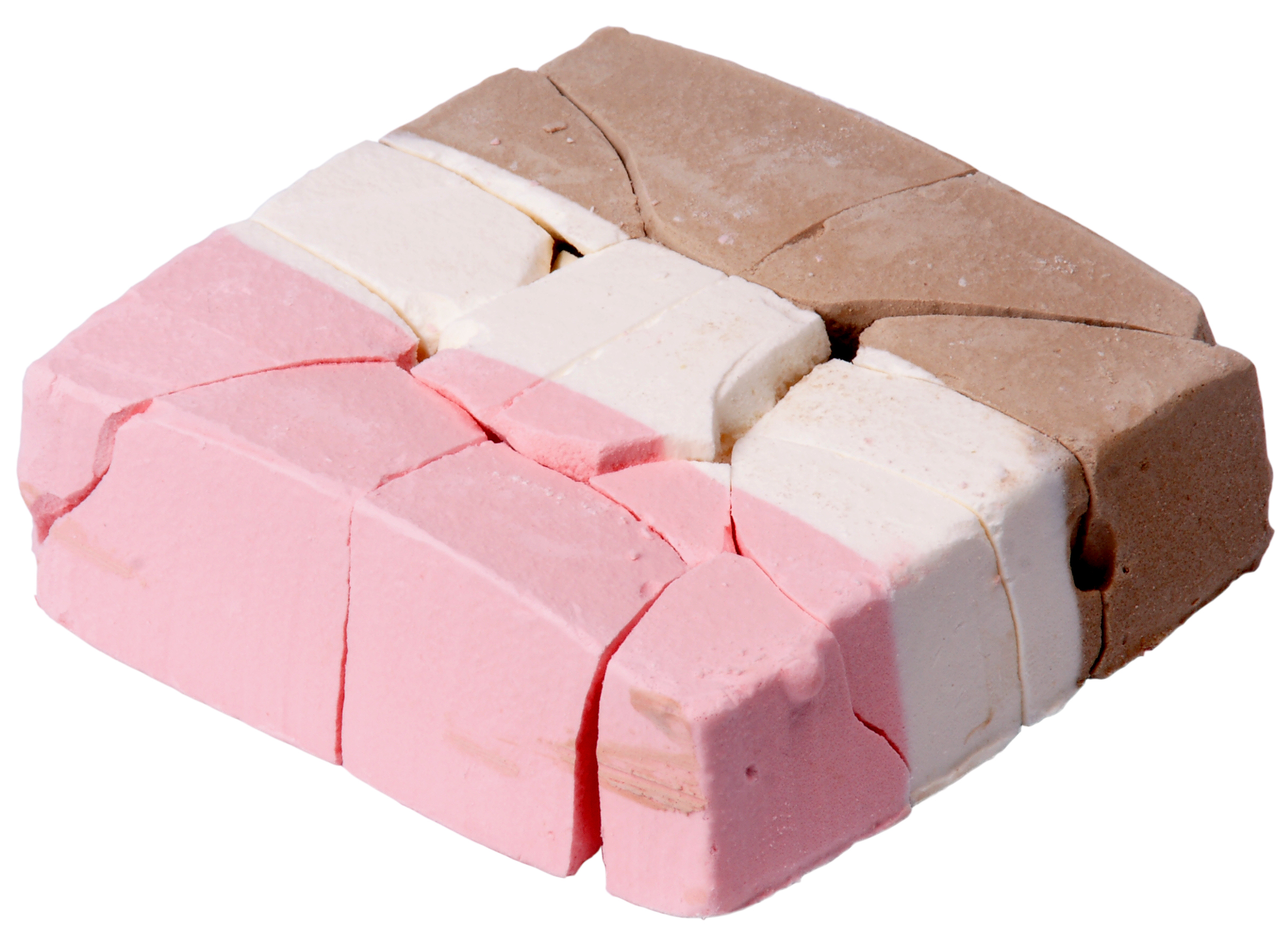
- Freeze-dried Neapolitan ice cream
- Type: Ice cream
- Created by: Whirlpool Corporation

A freeze-dried Ice cream sandwich in a bag.

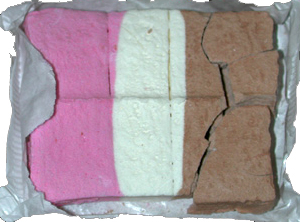
Freeze-dried Neapolitan ice cream, shown with air-tight foil partially unwrapped

Freeze-dried ice cream, also called astronaut ice cream or space ice cream, is ice cream that has had most of the water removed from it by a freeze-drying process. Compared to regular ice cream, it can be kept at room temperature without melting, is dry and more brittle and rigid, but still soft when bitten into. It was developed by Whirlpool Corporation under contract to NASA for the Apollo missions. However, it was not used on any Apollo mission. Freeze-dried foods were developed so that foods could be sent on long-duration spaceflights (e.g. to the Moon), and to reduce the weight of the water and oxygen (which both play a significant role in food deterioration) normally found in food. The process of freeze-drying also eliminates the possibility of food melting and spilling as liquid in zero-gravity, which would be difficult to manage during missions.

Freeze-drying (or lyophilization) removes water from the ice cream by lowering the air pressure to a point where ice sublimates directly from a solid to a gas. The ice cream is first placed in a vacuum chamber and frozen until any remaining water crystallizes. The air pressure is then lowered below water's triple point, creating a partial vacuum, forcing air out of the chamber; next, heat is applied, sublimating the ice; finally a freezing coil traps and turns the vaporized water into ice. This process continues for hours, resulting in a freeze-dried ice cream slice.

== History ==
During the 1970s, astronauts ate regular ice cream on the Skylab space station; it has also been eaten on the International Space Station. Skylab had a freezer that was used for regular ice cream, and occasionally Space Shuttle and International Space Station astronauts took regular ice cream into space.

Freeze-dried foods were initially developed for the Mercury missions. Despite use of images of space-walking astronauts in space suits on product packaging, freeze-dried ice cream was not included on any mission in which space suits were used. The only evidence for freeze-dried ice cream ever having flown in space is the menu for the Apollo 7 mission, on which it is listed for one of the meals. However, when the only surviving member of Apollo 7 was asked, he did not remember it being served on the flight.

According to one NASA food scientist, although freeze-dried ice cream was developed on request, "it wasn't that popular."

== Public consumption ==
The center at the Ames Research Center in California began researching how to allow visitors to taste astronaut food in 1973. They contacted American Outdoor Products and Backpacker's Pantry, the latter becoming a known source for freeze-dried meals like stews and even pasta dishes for serious campers and backpackers. NASA/AMES worked with American Outdoor Products to produce the world first freeze-dried ice cream and Astronaut Foods with the goal to allow people to see what space food tastes like.

== See also ==
- Camping food
- List of dried foods
- Space food
