= Oatmeal raisin cookie =

Drop cookie containing oatmeal and raisins

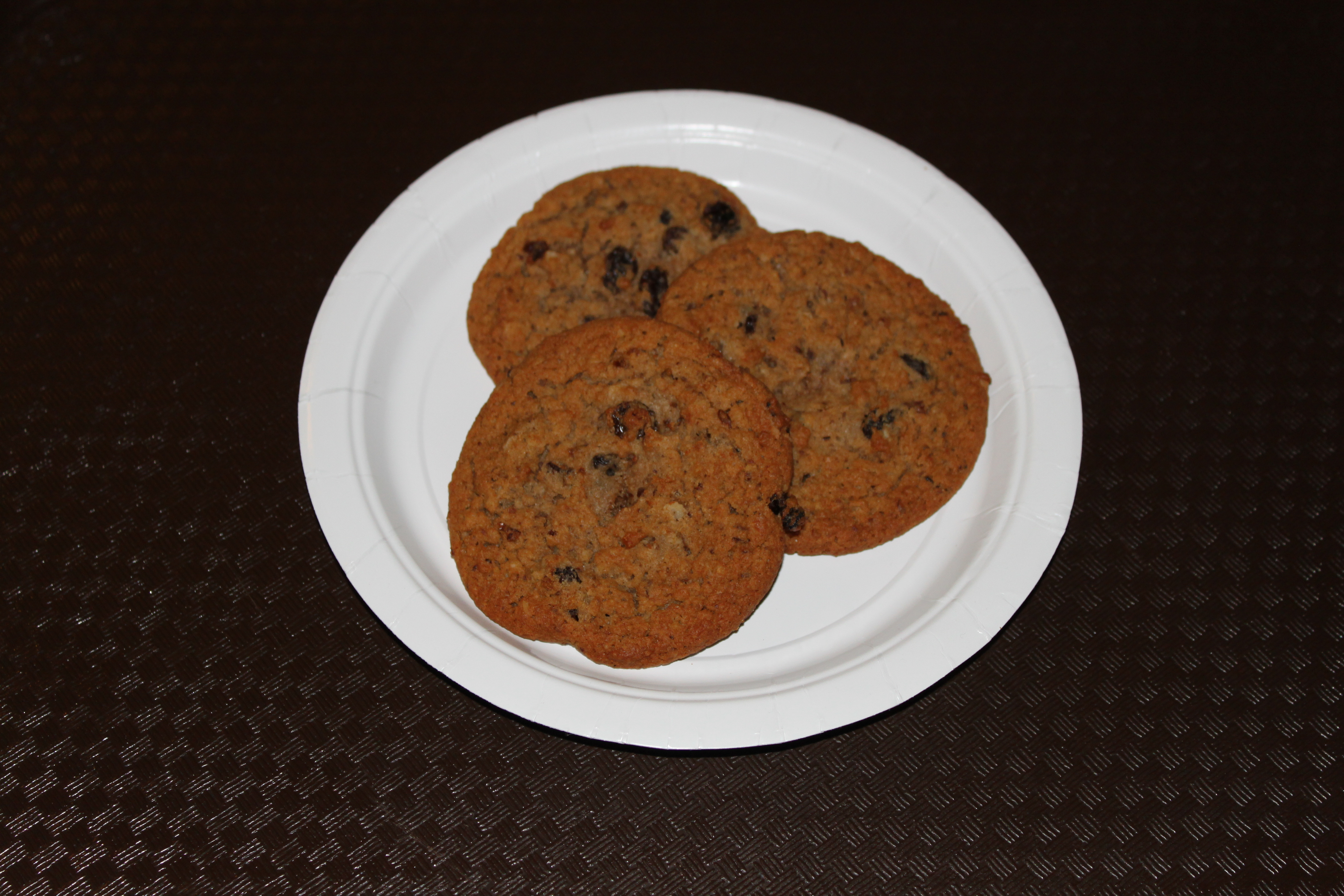
- Commercial oatmeal raisin cookies from Archway Cookies
- Type: Cookie
- Course: Dessert or snack
- Place of origin: United States
- Main ingredients: Oatmeal, raisins
- Ingredients generally used: Flour, sugar, eggs, salt, spices
- Similar dishes: Oatcake

An oatmeal raisin cookie is a type of drop cookie, featuring raisins throughout and oatmeal as the basis of the dough. Other typical ingredients include flour, sugar, eggs, salt, and spices.

When the cookies were becoming prominent in the United States in the early 1900s, they came to be known as a health food because of the fiber and vitamins from the oatmeal and raisins. Nonetheless, the nutritional value of an oatmeal raisin cookie is essentially the same as a chocolate chip cookie in sugar and calorie content. Depending on how many raisins or oats are added, the fat and fiber content may not be much different either.

== History ==
The first recorded recipes for oatmeal cookies appeared in America in the 1890s, at a time when industry was heavily promoting the recently invented rolled oats. These early versions did not contain raisins. Food writer Stella Parks does not give an exact date for the first rolled oatmeal cookie, but describes recipes for them close to their modern versions "[seeming] to multiply throughout the cookbooks of the 1890s". Cookbook author Jean Anderson traces the earliest oatmeal cookie recipe to Fannie Farmer's 1896 cookbook The Boston Cooking-School Cook Book.

By the 1910s, it was raisins that were being heavily marketed in America. Parks identifies Souvenir California Raisin Recipe Book, a 1915 cookbook published by California-based raisin producers Sun-Maid, as containing the first oatmeal raisin recipe. Noting that Sun-Maid and Quaker Oats both employed the same marketing firm, Parks speculates that the combination may have been an attempt to simultaneously serve multiple clients. Over the following decades, various cookbooks featured recipes for oatmeal raisin cookies. The low sugar and flour content may have contributed to the cookie's appeal in this period, which included wars and recession.

The inclusion of raisins grew more common over time, due in part to the oatmeal raisin cookie recipes featured on every Quaker Oats container beginning in the early 1900s.

== Variations ==
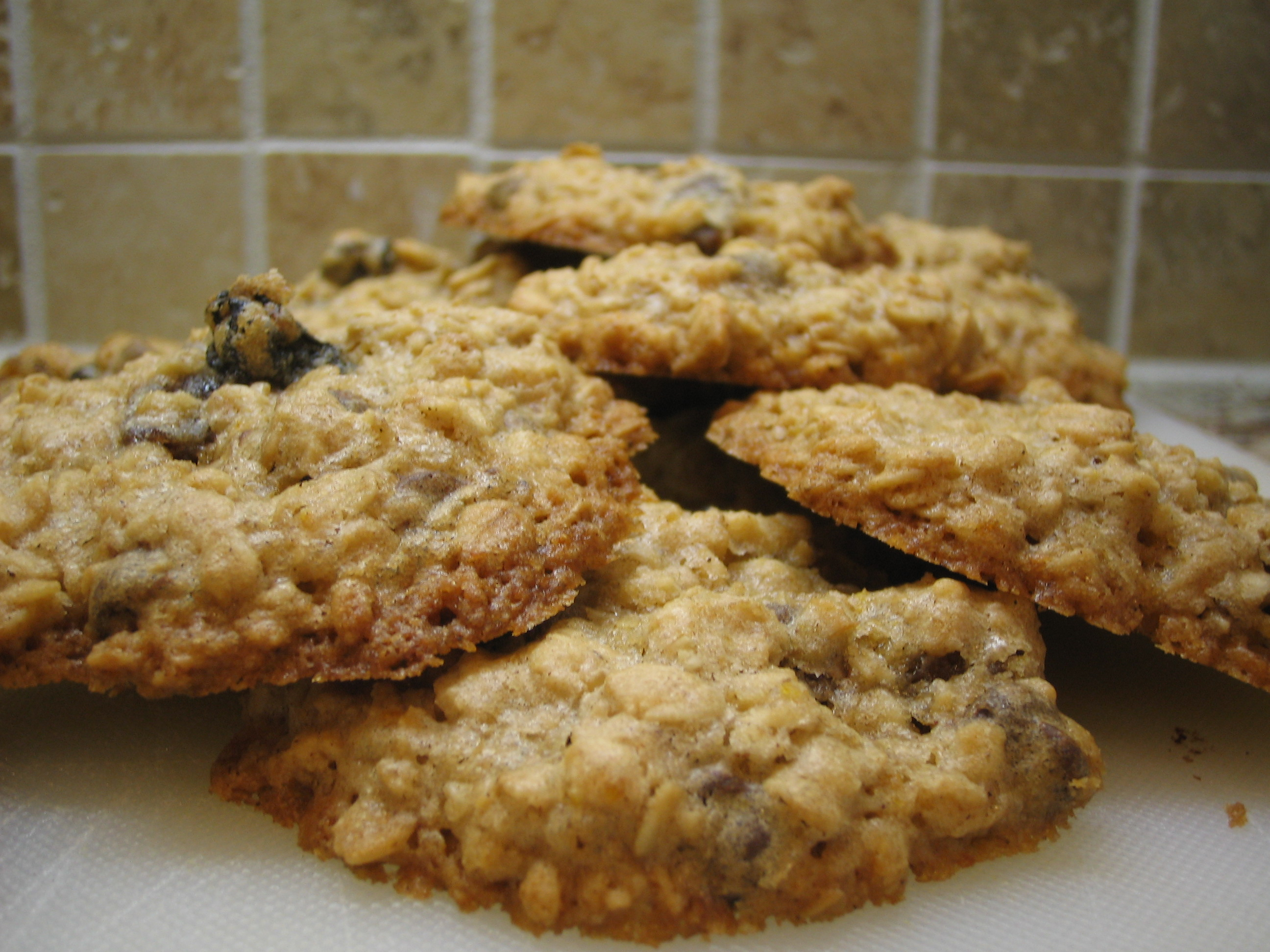
Orange zest and chocolate chips added

In addition to plain oatmeal cookies, chocolate chips may be added instead of raisins. Other flavorings may be added in addition to the traditional spices.

== Reputation ==
Today, oatmeal raisin cookies have a reputation for being old fashioned, and their appeal is polarizing.

== See also ==
- Anzac biscuit, made with rolled oats
- List of cookies
