= Hochdorf Holding =

Swiss food company

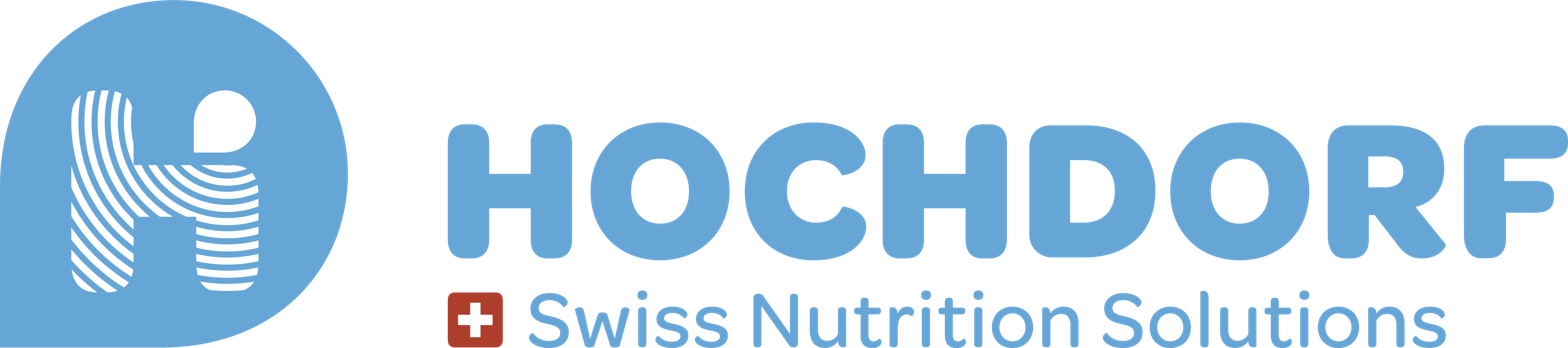
- ISIN: CH0024666528
- Industry: Dairy
- Founded: 1895
- Headquarters: Hochdorf, Switzerland
- Key people: Ralph Siegel (Chairman of the Executive Board and Delegate of the Board of Directors); Jürg Oleas (President of Board of Directors)
- Revenue: 303.5 mil. CHF(2021)
- Number of employees: 387 (2021)
- Website: hochdorf.com

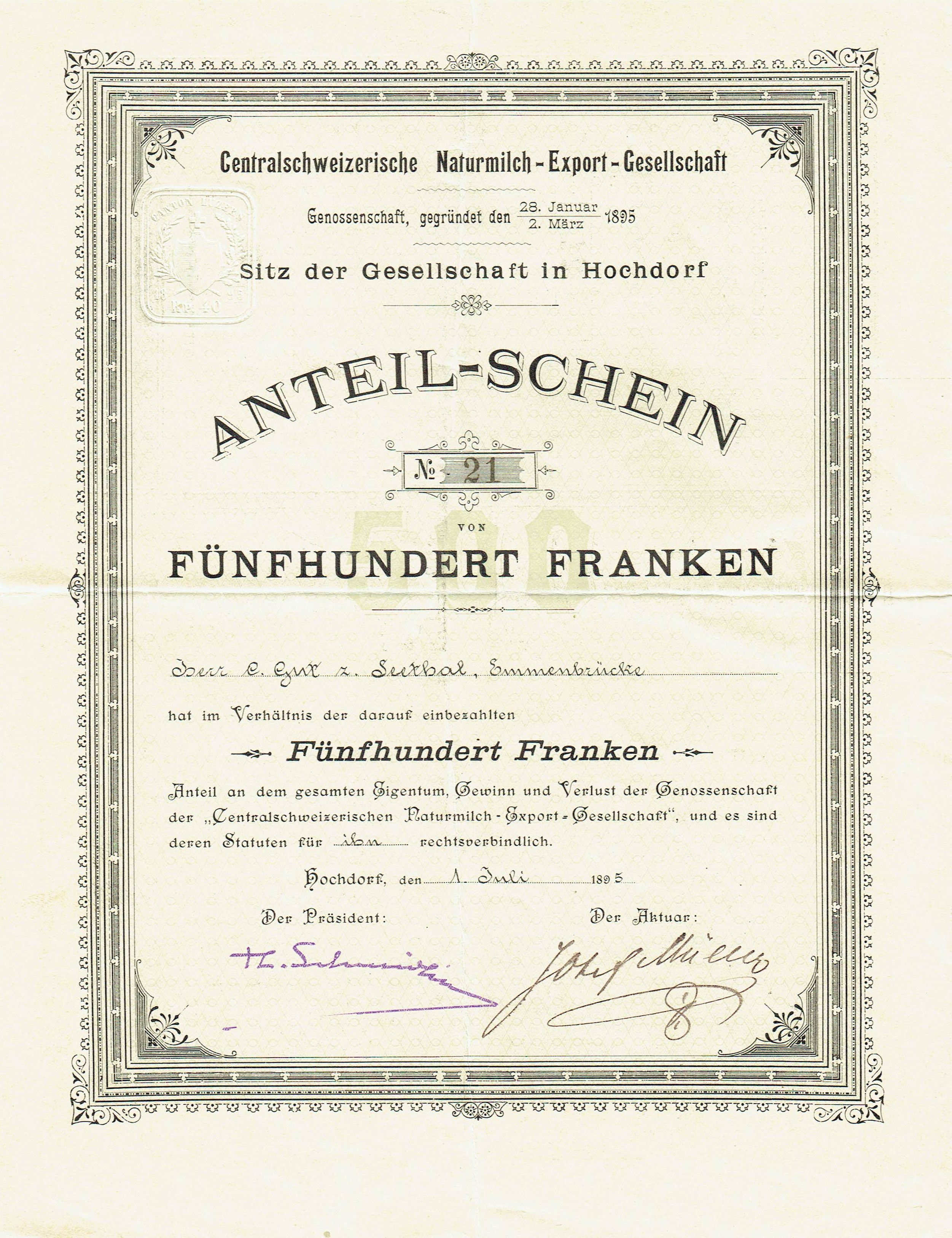
Share certificate worth 500 francs of the Centralschweizerische Naturmilch-Export-Gesellschaft dated July 1, 1895

Hochdorf Holding, often referred to as the Hochdorf Group, is a Swiss food company based in Hochdorf and the fourth largest dairy company in Switzerland (after Emmi, Cremo and Estavayer Lait and ahead of Züger Frischkäse). As of 31 December 2021, the group of companies employed 387 people and generated a consolidated net sales of 303.5 million Swiss francs. Hochdorf Holding is one of the 500 largest companies in Switzerland. Its shares have been listed on the SIX Swiss Exchange since 17. May 2011.

== Production ==
The Hochdorf group produces milk powder, baby food, sports and diet products and other milk-based ingredients and products. Production takes place at the Hochdorf and Sulgen sites.

== History ==
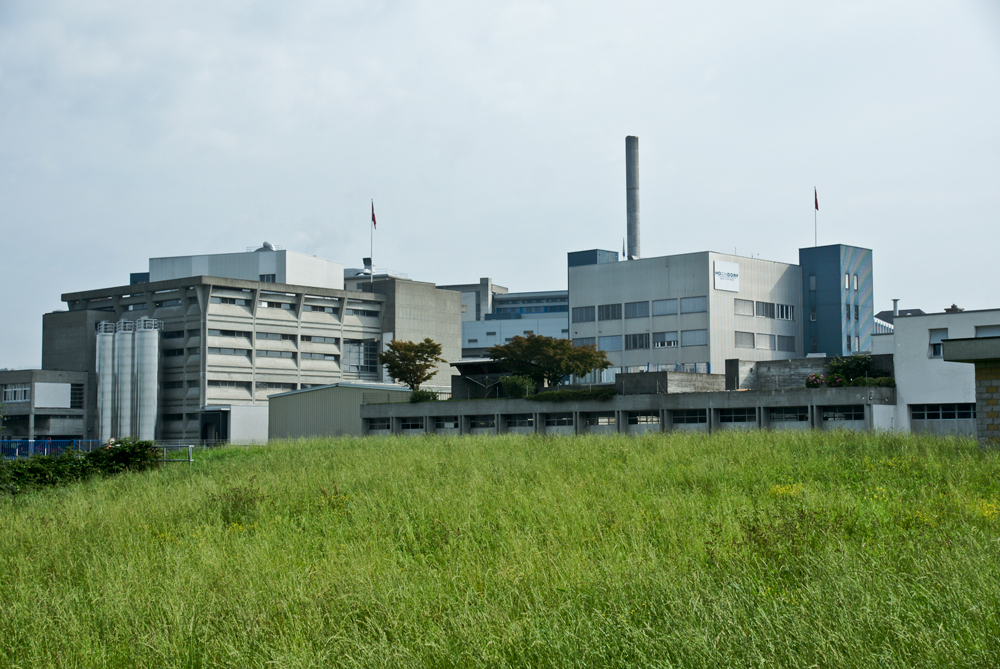
Production site Hochdorf

The company was founded in 1895 as the 1. Centralschweizerische Natur-Milch-Exportgesellschaft (1. Central Swiss natural milk export association) by 21 members of the Hochdorf cheese dairy cooperative and was renamed to Swiss Milk Company in 1899.

Around 100 years later, in 2000, the company was renamed Hochdorf Nutritec AG. In 2003, they acquired Multiforsa AG in Steinhausen and Schweizerische Milch-Gesellschaft AG (Swiss Milk-Association AG) in Sulgen.

In 2006, the now total of seven companies, were recognized under the umbrella of Hochdorf Holding and the market presence was unified under the Hochdorf name. Multiforsa AG, which specifies in the field of animal health, was sold to Vital Holding GmbH in 2007. At the beginning of 2009, the two subsidiaries Hochdorf Nutrifood and Hochdorf Nutrition were merged.

Hochdorf Nutrimedical AG was founded in 2011 and then sold in 2013.

In September 2014, Hochdorf announced the acquisition of a 60% stake in the east German dairy factory Uckermärker Milch GmbH, which would be officially complete by the beginning of 2015. They also took over 26% each (block minority) in the Ostmilch Handels GmbH (which markets Uckermärker Milch products and holds the remaining 40% of its stakes) and in two associated fresh-service companies. The dry milk plant was said to receive an expansion to produce baby food for sales in Europe, Central and South American markets, which the previous Hochdorf capacities were insufficient for. At the end of February 2020, Hochdorf sold its 60% stake in Uckermärker Milch GmbH to Ostmilch. The milk protein plant in Medeikiai Lithuania had already been sold in 2018.

At the end of 2014, Hochdorf took over the German wheat germ processor Marbacher Ölmühle in Marbach am Necker with a turnover of almost 10 million euros (2013). Marbacher Ölmühle GmbH was sold at the end of 2020. In April 2018, Bimbosan AG, which specializes in baby food and is based in Welschenrohr, was taken over. In 2021, the headquarters were relocated to Hochdorf and merged with HOCHDORF Swiss Nutrition AG. Production in Welschenrohr was then closed down. In 2021 Bimbosan baby food made out of goat milk was introduced.

At the beginning of 2019, Hochdorf took over the majority of shares (56.12 percent) in Thur Milch AG. Before 17.65 percent of the shares were already owned by Hochdorf. As a consequence, a third of the suppliers quit. In addition, Hochdorf still owned 51 percent of the Tunisian marketing organization Pharmalys Laboratories SA until the end of 2019. In 2019, Hochdorf reported a net loss of around 271.4 million Swiss francs.

In August 2021, the Hochdorf Group announced that production in Hochdorf would be phased out by the end of 2023 and more than a hundred jobs would be cut. The area in Hochdorf is to be sold and production pooled in Sulgen. Group management and administration will remain in Hochdorf. Eventually the Hochdorf Group and its pension fund sold the land and area in Hochdorf to the municipality for a total of CHF 60.2 million. The transaction is scheduled to be completed on 30 December 2021. The Hochdorf Group would therefore become the tenant of these properties.

In September 2023, it was announced that the site in Hochdorf would be retained until 2026. Then in March 2024, the company announcement that the site was to be sold. In April 2024, it was announced that the Italian food group Newlat had acquired almost 11 percent of the share capital. At the Annual General Meeting on 15 May 2024, the current Board of Directors was confirmed for another year of office, after Newlat wanted to replace the entire Board of Directors with its own candidates.

== Ownership ==
The main shareholder of the Hochdorf Group is Amir Mechria, the owner of Pharmalys Laboratories SA with 20%. He became the majority shareholder of the Hochdorf Group by converting three quarters of his mandatory convertible bonds. Other shareholders are ZMP Invest AG (18%; a 100% subsidiary of the Zentralschweizer Milchproduzenten and majority shareholder of the largest Swiss milk processing company Emmi AG), Bermont Investments Ltd. (British Virgin Islands) (14.6%), Innovent Holding AG of the Weiss family from Wollerau (5.58%), HOCHDORF Holding AG (1.38%), Quaero Capital SA (1.14%), Credit Suisse Asset Management (Switzerland) AG (0.76%), Dimensional Fund Advisors LP (0.73%), UBS Asset Management Switzerland AG (0.33%) and Pictet Asset Management SA (0.11%).

== Miscellaneous ==
- In 2015 alone, the Hochdorf Group collected 11.2 million Swiss francs in state export subsidies.
- Hochdorf Holding is a member of IG Bio.
