= Cremo (company) =

Swiss milk processing company

Cremo S.A.
- Industry: Dairy
- Founded: 1927
- Headquarters: Villars-sur-Glâne, Switzerland
- Key people: Ralph Perroud (CEO), Georges Godel (President of Board of Directors)
- Revenue: 512.9 mln CHF (2022)
- Number of employees: 794 (2022)

Cremo S.A., based in Villars-sur-Glâne, is a Swiss milk processing company and the second largest dairy company in Switzerland after Emmi and ahead of Hochdorf, Estavayer Lait and Züger Frischkäse.

It produces and markets various dairy products, such as butter, milk, UHT-cream, portioned coffee cream, yoghurts, hard and semi-hard cheeses such as Le Gruyère AOC and Vacherin Fribourgeois, but also milk powder and protein concentrates, which are used in the food and pharmaceutical industries.

Cremo is one of the 500 largest companies in Switzerland.

== History ==
Cremo's roots lie in the nationwide butter centers founded in 1917 by decree of the Swiss Federal Council. The butter center in Freiburg was put into operation in 1917 and was owned by the Milchverband Waadt-Freiburg (Vaud-Freiburg Milk Association) and the Milchverband der Berggebiete (Mountain Area Milk Association). In 1927, the two responsible milk associations combined into a stock corporation called Cremo. Its aim was to produce and market all dairy products and milk by-products produced in the associations' catchment area.

Until the end of the 1960s, Cremo's growth was based primarily on the expansion of its product range. From the 1970s onwards, various takeovers took place, including the Freiburger Zentralmolkerei (Freiburg Central Dairy, 1972), the activities of the butter centers of Vevey, Neuchâtel and Lausanne (1973) and the chocolate factory Chocolats et Cafés Villars SA (1985), which specialized in the production of chocolate and the roasting of coffee and was sold ten years later to Soparind Bongrain (now the Groupe Savencia Saveurs & Spécialités). In 1987, Cremo acquired a stake in Lacto Prospérité SA.

On 13 April 1990, the production facility in Villars-sur-Glâne was destroyed by arson. As a result, production had to be stopped for several days and weeks.

In 1991, Cremo entered cooperation agreements with Laiteries Réunies de Genève (LRG) and Intermilch in Bern. In 1998, Cremo signed a cooperation agreement with Toni AG, which had integrated into Intermilch in 1997. That same year, Cremo took over the production of portioned coffee cream from the Toni Group's Gossau SG plant, after taking over Dietikon's plant a few years earlier.

Cremo is a shareholder of BO Butter GmbH.

At the end of 2002, Cremo, with the support of various milk associations and the relevant cantons, signed a takeover agreement for part of the activities of Swiss Dairy Food, which was in debt moratorium at the time. This led to the integration of the production sites Le Mont-sur-Lausanne (UHT bottling), Lucens (cheese and milk powder) and Thun (also cheese and milk powder) into Cremo.

The Association des Producteurs de Lait Cremo Valais (APLCV) is involved in the export company Lactofama which was founded in 2014.

In 2014, plans to build a new organic dairy factory in Lyss were announced. For this purpose, the Bio-Molkerei Seeland AG (BMS AG) was founded in 2015. The Lysser Molkerei Wasserfallen and the Molkerei Zaugg AG based in Biel were merged into BMS AG. In 2020, BMS AG merged into Cremo S.A. The factory was closed at the end of June 2023 because of a lack of products sold on the market, whereafter the Lyss site was abandoned.

Cremo is a founding member of the Interessensgemeinschaft Bio Schweiz (IG Bio) which was founded in 2015.

The company generated losses in the millions in 2017 (CHF −2.7 million) and 2018 (CHF −7.5 million). The company was able to end the 2019 financial year with a profit (CHF 0.4 million). In 2020 there was again a loss of CHF 3.1 million. In 2021, a profit of 20.3 million francs was made, before a loss of over 20 million francs was reported in 2022.

In 2019, the Federal Court confirmed that Cremo must reimburse the Swiss federal government 2.8 million francs in improperly received cheese-making bonuses from 2006 to 2015.

In order to maximize competitiveness, the Thun production site in Steffisburg was closed at the end of August 2021. As a result of the closure, around 40 jobs were cut. In 2022, Cremo sold the factory site to STI Bus AG from Thun. The delivery platform Petit Crémier, which is based at various locations, closed the Thun location at the end of September 2023. Production in Lucens is scheduled to be relocated to the Villars-sur-Glâne site by the end of 2023. As of 1 January 2022, the Augstbord cheese dairy from Turtmann, which specializes in Valais raclette cheese, was taken over. In 2022, the takeover of Innoprax AG, with the associated Lattesso brand, was announced. The mixed milk drink has been produced exclusively at the Cremo factory in Sierre since its launch in 2013.

Today Cremo is supplied by three regional direct supplier organizations: APLC (Freiburg), APLCV (Valais) and VBMC (Berne). The VBMC, or the Association of Bernese Milk Producers of CREMO AG, is based in Wattenwil.

== Management ==
From 1995 to 2020, Paul-Albert Nobs was the managing director of Cremo, Hervé Perret took over from 2020 to 2021. The company was led by Frédéric Métrailler, until Ralph Perroud took over the position in August 2023.

In 2023, Georges Godel was elected chairman of the board of directors. A position previously held by, Alexandre Cotting (2020–2023), Benoît Perroud (2012–2020), Alexis Gobet (1993–2012), and Pierre Reynaud (1943–1984) among others.
