= Metrecal =

1960s diet drink

Metrecal was an American brand of low-calorie, powdered diet foods (to be mixed with water as a beverage) "containing the essential nutrients of protein, carbohydrate, fat, vitamins and minerals" introduced in the early 1960s by the Mead Johnson company, with the first variety going on the market on October 6, 1959, the same day as another Mead Johnson product, Enfamil. Though the initial Metrecal products were criticized for their taste, which newer varieties of flavor tried to improve upon, it attained a niche in the popular culture of the time. Created and marketed initially by C. Joseph Genster of Mead Johnson & Company, it was eventually replaced in the market by competitors such as SlimFast and lost popularity.

== History ==
=== Founding ===
Mead Johnson had a long history of creating nutritional supplements for infants (Enfamil) and invalids, and Metrecal was seen as a logical progression into weight loss for the general public. Genster was the group director for nutritional specialties at Mead Johnson, which launched the product in September 1959, though it was unclear who conceived the original concept. Food innovator Sylvia Schur's company provided consulting work on the product's development. The name for the product was generated by an IBM syllable-scrambling program, that when "meter" and "calories" were entered, referring to the measured caloric intake of the diet, the name "Metrecal" was created.

=== Popular phase ===
Originally the product came as a powder (containing powdered skim milk, soybean flour, sugar and corn oil and fortified with vitamins and minerals) which was to be mixed with water. Metrecal included more protein than other weight-loss products available at the time. The Metrecal diet plan had people consume four self-prepared shakes (or portion-controlled cans) of Metrecal a day, with each can providing 225 calories for a total of 900 per day.

Many of those trying to subsist on 900 calories per day experienced hunger pangs, which would typically dissipate after a few days. In addition to the original vanilla flavor, later offerings included chocolate and butterscotch along with several other flavors, and the product line was extended to include Metrecal cookies, clam chowder and tuna with noodles. Stating that "most users agree that the stuff is vile-tasting", Time reported that many dieters would add liquor to make it more palatable.

Forbes noted how "Metrecal moved out of the medicine cabinet toward the kitchen, the patio, the pool", while an article in a November 1960 article in Time magazine reported that it was being purchased by "growing hordes of Schmoo-shaped addicts who were insisting on guzzling their way to the vanishing point" who were joined by the royalty of Greece and Saudi Arabia. In her 1963 book The Feminine Mystique, Betty Friedan lamented how women "ate a chalk called Metrecal, instead of food, to shrink to the size of thin young models".

=== Decline ===
The fad started fading in the mid-1960s, when Peter Wyden, author of the 1965 book The Overweight Society, noted that "even reasonably steadfast dieters simply grew tired" of the monotony of drinking the shakes day after day, as well as copycat products, such as Sego, taking market share. By March 1977, The New York Times said that Metrecal had "gone the way of all flesh" and a spokesperson for Bristol-Myers, which then owned Mead Johnson, acknowledged that "Times change. The market changes." Warnings regarding a wide range of liquid protein weight loss products were issued by the Food and Drug Administration starting later in 1977. In 1978, Metrecal and other similar products were pulled off shelves after the FDA connected 59 deaths, between late 1977 to early 1978, to liquid protein products.
