= C. Joseph Genster =

American businessman

- Born: September 5, 1917; Sheffield, Illinois
- Died: August 17, 2010 (aged 92)
- Known for: Executive at Mead Johnson
- Spouse: Barbara Anna Burke

Charles Joseph Genster (September 5, 1917 – August 17, 2010) was an American business executive at the nutrition company Mead Johnson who oversaw the development and marketing of Metrecal, a liquid diet drink that became a weight loss craze in the early 1960s.

Genster was born September 5, 1917, in Sheffield, Illinois, where he graduated from high school when he was 16 years old and spent a year working on a farm before attending college. While in college he enlisted in the United States Army during World War II and saw action in North Africa and Italy, winning a Silver Star and attained the rank of captain. He returned to college and earned his undergraduate degree in economics from the University of Illinois at Urbana–Champaign and earned a master's degree at Harvard Business School. He was recalled to Army duty during the Korean War and was ultimately hired by Mead Johnson in 1957.

As group director for nutritional specialties, the firm made nutrition products for infants and children. His team conceived of using many of the same ingredients to create a weight loss product. Originally sold in powder form, the name was generated by an IBM computer program. The Metrecal plan had dieters consume four cans daily, with each can providing 225 calories for a total of 900 calories per day, a quantity that was far lower than adults typically consumed and that would guarantee weight loss of a half pound per day if no other food was consumed. It was a marketing success from its launch in 1959, and Time gushed the following year that "no diet fad has ever taken the U.S. so overwhelmingly as the craze for the food supplement Metrecal". The main criticism was taste, with Betty Friedan describing in her 1963 book The Feminine Mystique that women "ate a chalk called Metrecal".

Genster was named president of the Edward Dalton Company, a new division within Mead Johnson that was centered on Metrecal. In that role he won advertising awards for campaigns that used the term "figure enhancement" rather than "weight loss". Genster oversaw the addition of chocolate, butterscotch and several other flavors, and created brand extensions such as Metrecal cookies and clam chowder, many of which were first tested on his own children. In 1963, Peter Wyden wrote in The Overweight Society that "the American consumer made clear that Joe Genster and his teammates had won a hallowed place in the hearts of their countrymen". Genster himself lost 20 pounds while he was on the diet, but Wyden noted that "even reasonably steadfast diners simply grew tired" of consuming the product several times daily, day after day, and the fad faded.

Genster died at age 92 on August 17, 2010, at his home in Princeton, New Jersey. He was survived by four daughters, one son and 10 grandchildren. His wife, the former Barbara Anna Burke, died in 2006.
