= Meyenberg Goat Milk =

Brand of goat milk products

- Type: goat milk
- Manufacturer: Emmi
- Origin: California, USA
- Introduced: 1934
- Website: http://www.meyenberg.com

Meyenberg Goat Milk is a brand of goat milk products. Established in 1934, the brand was created by John P. Meyenberg. The first to evaporate goat milk, Meyenberg was the son of John Baptiste Meÿenberg.

In 1921, John P. Meyenberg established the Meyenberg Milk Product Company in Salinas, California. The company, now owned by Jackson family, is located in Turlock, California. As majority stake owners Carol and Robert Jackson were set to retire, they sold the company to Emmi Group in 2017.

On the back of a carton of Meyenberg goat milk it reads: "The MEYENBERG tradition of producing quality goat milk in the late 1800s when a Swiss immigrant invented the process for evaporating cow's milk."

In 2021, the company launched Tailspring, a brand of goat milk alternatives for puppies and kittens.

== Production ==
Meyenberg Goat Milk Products are the top producers of commercially distributed goat milk in the United States. Among the products sold by the company are powdered and liquid milk, butter and cheddar cheese.
