= Aaremilch =

Swiss milk producer

Aaremilch AG
- Industry: Dairy
- Founded: 2007
- Headquarters: Lyss (BE), Switzerland
- Key people: Rudolf Bigler (President of administrative board); Donat Schneider (CEO)
- Website: aaremilch.ch

Aaremilch AG is a Swiss milk producer organization based in Lyss.

== History ==
Aaremilch AG goes back to Lobag Milch AG based in Ostmundingen, which was founded in 2007 by the LOBAG Genossenschaft, Landwirtschaftliche Organisation Bern und angrenzende Gebiete (LOBAG cooperative, agricultural organisation Bern and neighbouring areas, since 2015 Berner Bauern Verband). The cooperative decided in February 2012 to separate its advocacy representations and milk trades. In 2013 the company was renamed Aaremilch AG and the headquarters was moved to Lyss. Aaremilch is involved in the export company Lactofama, which was founded in 2014. In 2018, Aaremilch took over the membership of the Berner Bauern Verband in the Schweizer Milchproduzenten (Swiss Milk Producers, SMP).

In June 2022, it was announced that Estavayer Lait (Elsa) wanted to acquire 50% stake in Aaremilch AG and Simmental Switzerland AG. The administration of the Migros-Genossenschafts-Bundes and the shareholders of Aaremilch AG as well as the Competition Commission approved the transaction. Managing director, Donat Schneider, will leave the company at the end of June 2024, after having held the position since 2013. Schneider was previously managing director of what is now the Berner Bauern Verband since 2006. He was replaced in his position as managing director by Reto Burkhardt starting as of 1 March 2023.

=== Naturparkkäserei Diemtigtal ===
In March 2018, construction of the Naturparkkäserei (nature park dairy farm) in the municipality of Diemtigen began, and Elsa, together with Migros Aare, invested in a milk bottling plant. Around 90% of the cheese is intended for export. The Naturparkkäserei Diemtigtal AG rents the dairy farm to Simmental Switzerland AG and Elsa. At the end of May 2021, it was announced that Migros Aare would be taking over 23% stakes in the Naturparkkäserei Diemtigtal AG, that the milk bottling plant was to be expanded and that organic milk will also be bottled there. Aaremilch AG holds 77% of the shares, the other 23% is held by the Dutch company Royal A-Ware.

=== Simmental Switzerland ===
Simmental Switzerland AG was founded as a subsidiary of Aaremilch AG but has been completely taken over by Elsa. The cheese dairy company also produces Switzerland Swiss, a foil-ripened large-hole cheese made from silage milk, which, among other things, is sold as M-Budget cheese under the name “Simmentaler” for Migros. Meadow milk is processed at the Estavayer location and bottled directly in the Diemtigtal nature park dairy farm for Migros Aare, bears the label “From the region” and is marketed as such.

== Members ==
Members of Aaremilch AG is made up of around 2,000 milk producers, 60 cheese factories, and dairy farms from the Bern, Freiburg, Neuchâtel and Lucerne regions. The milk producers are grouped into 14 regional milk rings.

== Criticism ==
The vertical integration of Migros is critically viewed by Boris Beuret, President of the Schweizer Milchproduzenten and the MIBA Genossenschaft. The participation of Migros would weaken the position of producers.
