= Schrafft's =

Former American candy company

Coordinates: 42°23′04″N 71°04′20″W

The Schrafft Candy Company
- Founded: 1861
- Founder: William F. Schrafft
- Defunct: 1984
- Parent: Frank G. Shattuck Company (1929–1967); Helme Products (1967–1974); Gulf and Western Industries (1974–1981); American Safety Razor Company (1981–1984)

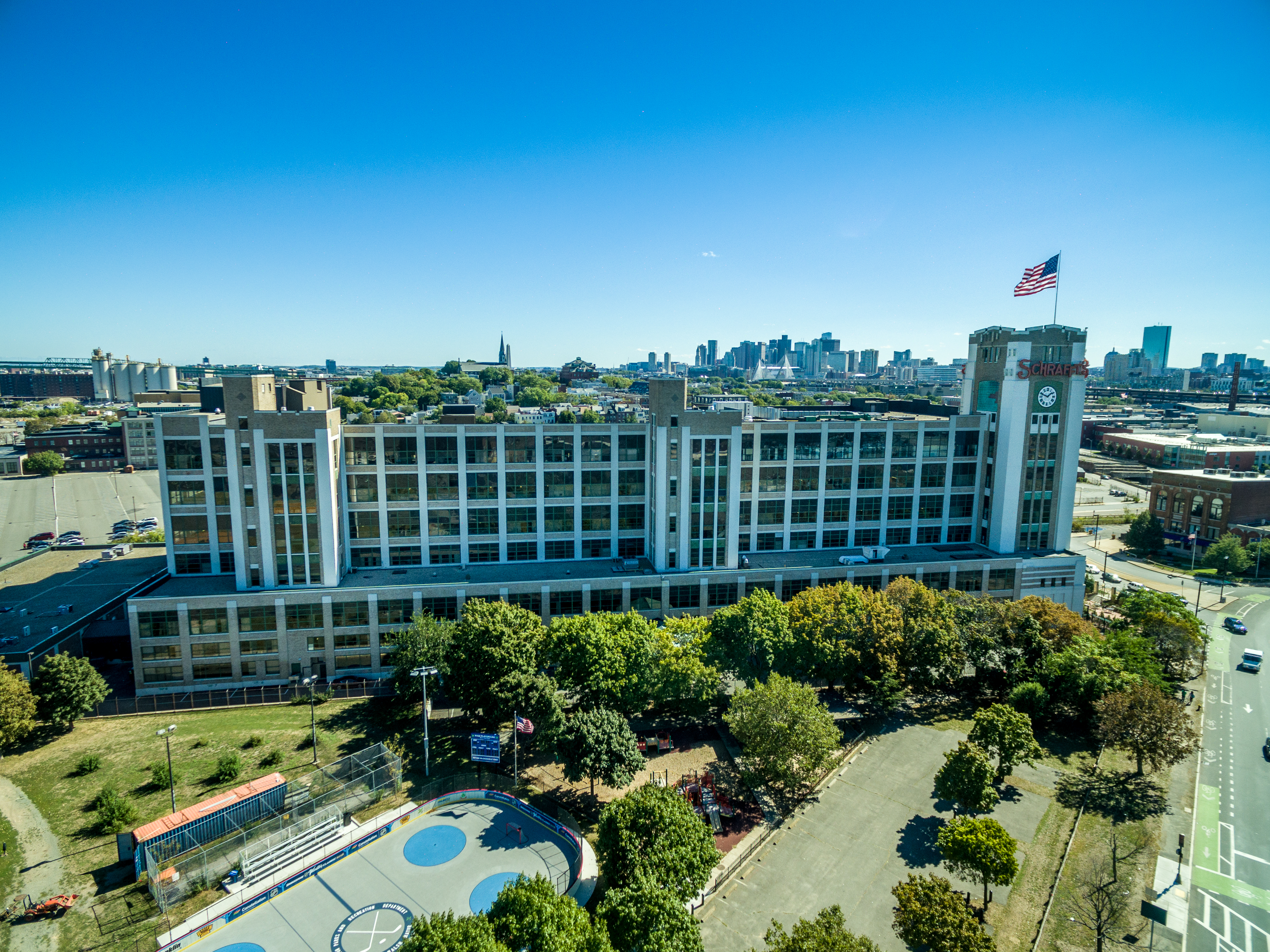
Schrafft's City Center campus (September 2016)

The Schrafft Center office complex in Charlestown, Massachusetts, the former factory that produced Schrafft's candies (March 2008)

The Schrafft Candy Company was a candy, chocolate and cake company based in Sullivan Square, Charlestown, Massachusetts. In 1861, it introduced jelly beans to the United States and told the customers to send them off to civil war soldiers. The famous Schrafft's neon sign is a significant landmark in Boston, although the former factory it sits above, constructed in 1928, has been redeveloped for business accommodation. Schrafft's later expanded to form a chain of Schrafft's restaurants in New York, and a collection of motor inns and restaurants along the eastern seaboard from New England to Florida during the 1950s and 1960s.

== History ==
Schrafft's was founded as a candy company by William F. Schrafft in Boston, in 1861. The company expanded into the restaurant business, and by 1915, they had nine stores in Manhattan, one in Brooklyn, and one in Syracuse, NY, as well as the facility in Boston. In 1929, Schrafft's was acquired by the Frank G. Shattuck Company. They had grown to 22 stores in 1923, 42 stores in 1934, and 55 stores in 1968.

Schrafft's sponsored the 1959 CBS telecast of The Wizard of Oz, the first of the film's annual telecasts (it had been shown once before on television in 1956).

PET milk merged with the Frank G. Shattuck Company in 1967, breaking the ice cream, restaurant and cake, and candy operations into separate companies. Gulf and Western Industries acquired the candy operations in 1974 from Helme Products.

In 1968, in an attempt to broaden their customer base, Schrafft's commissioned a 60-second television commercial from pop artist Andy Warhol.

In 1981, Gulf and Western announced it would shut down its Schrafft Candy subsidiary after it had continued to be unprofitable. Schrafft's was later sold to the American Safety Razor Company.

In 1984, it was announced that Schrafft's last candy factory would be closed. American Safety Razor originally had plans to sell the plant to a group of private investors led by Samuel R. Kostick, but the deal fell through when the group could not raise enough money. After its closure, the plant was sold to The Flatley Company.

The former candy factory was renovated and turned into a commercial office space. Located at 529 Main Street, Charlestown, Massachusetts, it is known as The Schrafft Center. Among its tenants are Business Valuation Resources, Boston Digital, Fitcorp, All IT Supported, Bright Horizons Family Solutions, Beacon Hospice, iCorps Technology, Mary Kay Cosmetics, Newton Scientific, Telemundo Boston, Crestron Electronics, Quadratic 3D, and the Massachusetts Department of Public Health.
