= Progresso =

American food company

- Progresso logo
- Industry: Food processing
- Founded: New Orleans, Louisiana (1925; 101 years ago)
- Founder: Vincent Taormina, and Joseph Uddo
- Parent: General Mills

Progresso, a brand of General Mills, is an American food company that produces canned soups, canned beans, broths, chili, and other food products.

== History ==
Progresso emerged from the merging of two prominent Italian importing companies in New Orleans, Louisiana. In 1925, Vincent Taormina, who had traveled east to start a tomato importing business, and Giuseppe Uddo merged their companies. Vincent's family owned the "Taormina Brothers Grocery" of New Orleans, Louisiana. Frank had emigrated from Italy and joined his cousin Vincent in the venture.

They were so successful selling tomatoes that they sold more orders than they could fill and needed funds to set up the infrastructure for a larger canning operation. Giuseppe Uddo, who had already established a national canning operation, brought the Taorminas on board to form a new merged company. The resultant company was "The Uddo and Taormina Corporation" and they created the Progresso label, specializing in canned Italian food products, which became mostly soup, olive oil, tomatoes, spaghetti, ravioli and beans, sold since 1949.

In 1979, Ogden Corporation bought Progresso for $35 million. In 1986 Ogden Foods was sold to Pet, Inc. for $320 million. In 1995, Pet, Inc. was acquired by the Pillsbury Company, then a subsidiary of Grand Metropolitan. General Mills acquired Pillsbury in 2001.

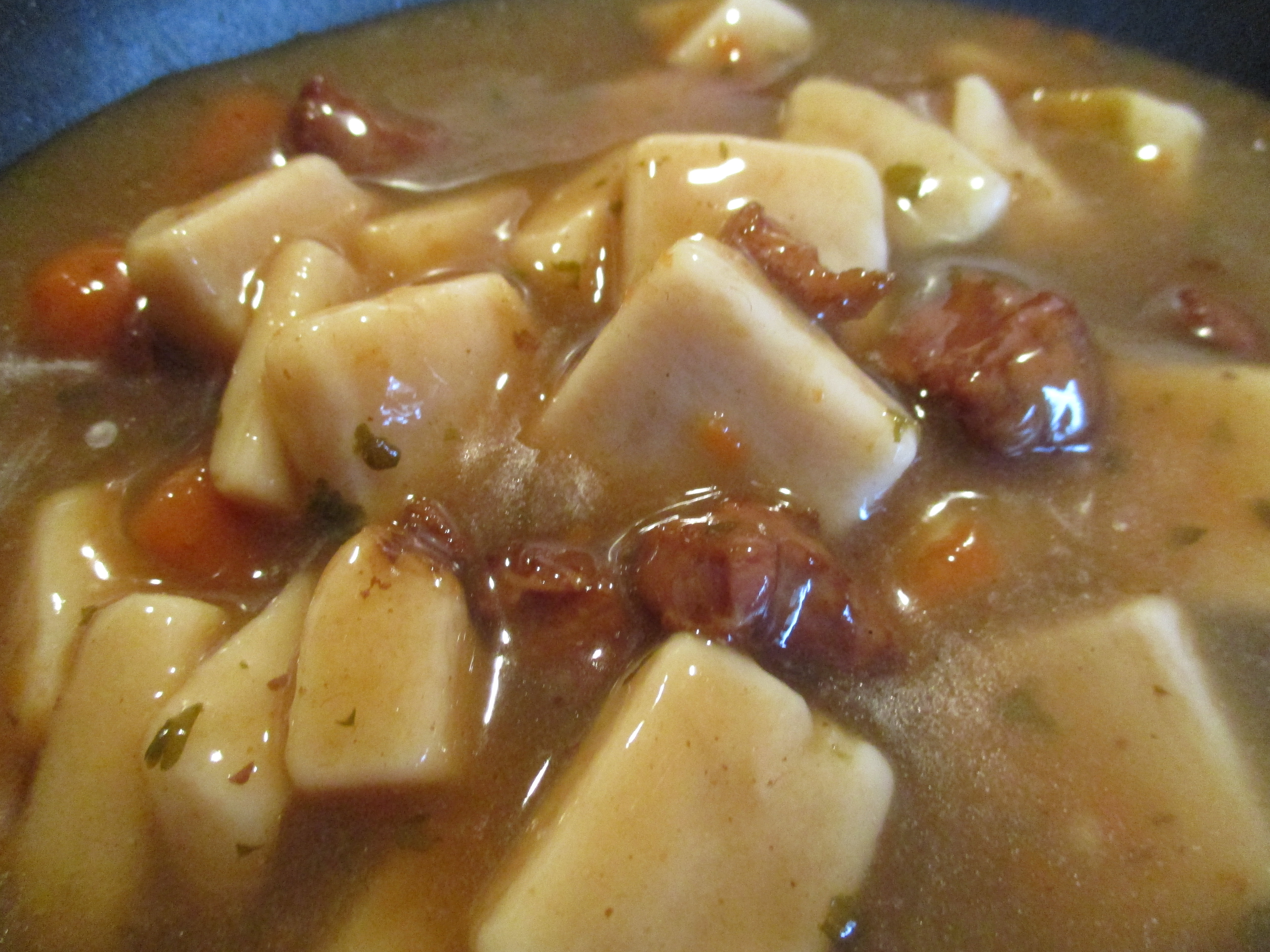
A can of "Steak and Roasted Russet Potatoes" ready to be heated on the stove
