= Old El Paso =

American brand of Tex-Mex food

- Product type: Tex-Mex food
- Current owner: General Mills
- Country: United States
- Introduced: 1938; 88 years ago
- Markets: Worldwide
- Previous owners: Mountain Pass Canning Company; Pet, Inc. Pillsbury Company
- Tagline: "Make some noise"
- Website: www.oldelpaso.com

Old El Paso is a brand of Tex-Mex-style foods from American food producer General Mills. These include dinner kits, tacos and tortillas, taco seasoning, sauces, condiments, rice, and refried beans.

Old El Paso products are marketed across the globe. The brand is owned by General Mills. Pillsbury acquired it in 1995, when its then-parent company Grand Metropolitan bought Pet, Inc., which had itself taken over the brand in 1968 from the Mountain Pass Canning Company.

The name is a reference to the city of El Paso, Texas, and the historical "Old" period when Texas was a part of Mexico.

== History and products ==
In 1917, the Mountain Pass Canning Company in New Mexico was bought from a local in El Paso, Texas. The Old El Paso company originally started by selling canned tomatoes and pinto beans. By 1938, Old El Paso was registered as a trade mark.

Old El Paso relocated to many locations around the United States, before finally settling in Texas in 1958. In 1969, Old El Paso became the first national brand to offer a full line of Mexican meals in supermarkets and the first to advertise Mexican cuisine in the United States.

In the 1970s, American supermarkets created a Mexican food section in their stores for the first time, due to the influence of Old El Paso and other Mexican food products. Also in the 1970s, Old El Paso introduced a taco dinner globally, where many international markets were unfamiliar at the time with Mexican cuisine.

In 2010, Old El Paso released products under the "Smart Fiesta" line, also known as "Healthy Fiesta" in some regions. This line features healthier alternatives for their traditional dinner kits. The Smart Fiesta dinner kits include hard and soft taco shells and tortillas made with whole grain, and fajita and taco seasoning with reduced sodium.

A commercial for Old El Paso products aired primarily in Australia in the mid/late 2000s featured a young girl asking in Spanish, "¿Por qué no los dos?" ("Why not both" or literally, "Why not the two?"). Clips of this catchphrase in the commercial became an Internet meme.

In 2013, Old El Paso introduced their new frozen entrees line, only available in the United States. The product line features frozen ready-made burritos, quesadillas, enchiladas, and fajitas. The entrees are available in chicken, ground beef, or steak. There are no vegan or vegetarian options currently.

In 2019, Old El Paso introduced a new shredded cheese line in partnership with Crystal Farms Dairy Company.

In September 2026, General Mills announced that it would become the new title sponsor of the Sun Bowl, a college football bowl game played in El Paso, Texas, via the Old El Paso brand, rebranding the game as the Old El Paso Sun Bowl.

Old El Paso is sold in the United States, Canada, Denmark, the United Kingdom, Germany, Australia, New Zealand, Ireland, France, Italy, Spain, Portugal, Switzerland, Sweden, Norway, and Finland, among other countries.
