= Sego (diet drink) =

American meal replacement drink

Sego was a US meal replacement diet drink formally marketed by Pet, Inc., (at the time Pet Milk) as Sego Liquid Diet Food. Introduced in 1961 and selling for approximately US25¢ each, Sego sales registered US$22 million to the company's Milk Products Division by 1965.

The name Sego derived from a Salt Lake City-based company, Sego Milk Products Company, that Pet Milk had purchased in 1925.

Sold in 10-ounce cans, before the advent of aluminum cans or cans with pull tabs, the beverages were available in flavors including Chocolate, Chocolate Coconut, Chocolate Malt, Vanilla, Strawberry, Banana and Orange—each providing 225 calories (four cans to be consumed daily, for a total of 900 calories). Marketed under the taglines "See the pounds go with Sego" and "Sego, it's great for your ego," Pet advertised the drinks as being "thicker" and having 10% more protein and 2 more ounces than other 900-calorie foods—for example, Metrecal, its predecessor in the market and the market leader—asserting that protein "helps control hunger." In 1966, milk chocolate, caramel fudge and butter pecan flavors became available, and Pet Milk subsequently offered Sego branded pudding and soup—and, later still, diet bars.

By 1961, there were more than 100 meal replacement products on the U.S. market, and Sego competed with such products as Metrecal, and Figurines from Pillsbury, and was ultimately superseded in the market place by such liquid diet drinks as Slimfast.

In the 2010 book The Hundred Year Diet, author Susan Yager called Sego "baby formula mixed with water and a poor substitute for food."

Actress Tippi Hedren was discovered by Alfred Hitchcock while shooting a television commercial for Sego on the Today Show. Hedren later described the spot as "a story line; it wasn't just holding up a product and talking about it. It was a story and apparently he (Hitchcock) saw it."

== See also ==
- Slimfast
- Metrecal
