= Schrafft's (restaurant chain) =

Former American restaurant chain

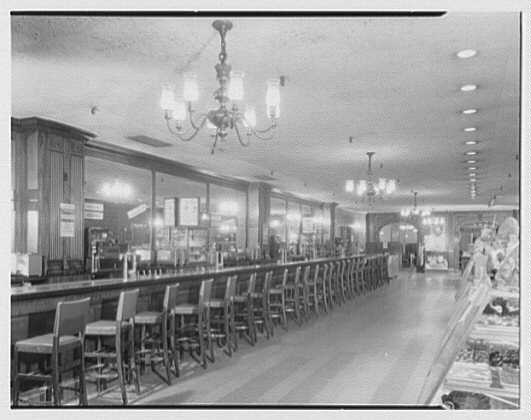
- Interior of Schrafft's 58th St. location in 1957
- Industry: Restaurant
- Founded: 1898
- Defunct: 1981
- Number of locations: Over 50 (peak)
- Parent: Schrafft's; Pet, Inc. (from 1967)

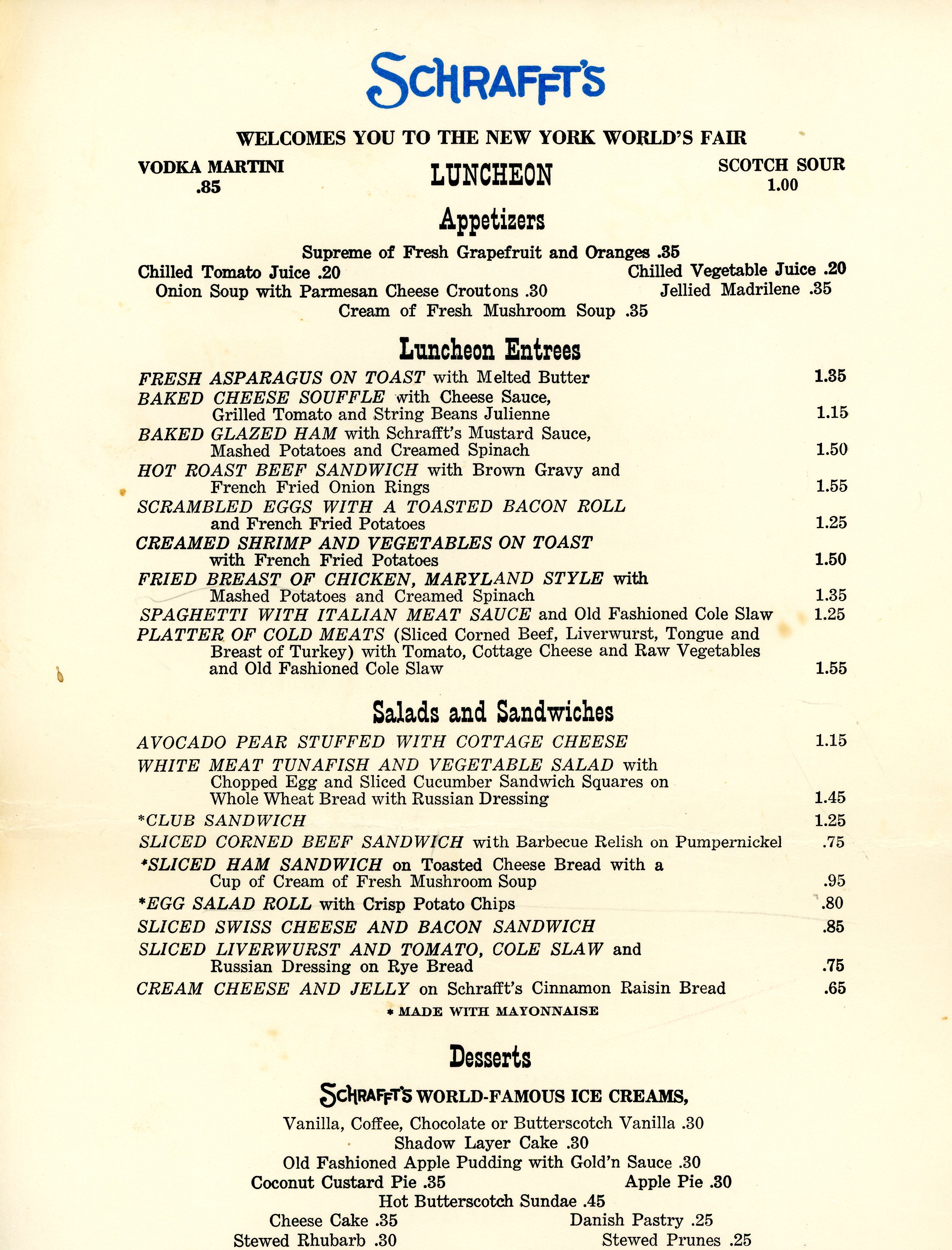
Menu from the 1964 New York World's Fair

Schrafft's was a chain of high-volume moderately priced New York City restaurants connected to the Schrafft's food and candy business of Boston. The dining rooms, which had tablecloths at dinner time, and later had separate standing bar areas, were supplemented by fountain service lunch counters, separate rooms in which were displayed for sale Schrafft's branded candy and ice cream, and various items such as wrapped gift baskets of fruit, candy and stuffed toys.

== History ==
Schrafft's was founded by William G. Schrafft as a candy manufacturer in Boston, but over time the company also became a well-known restaurant. In 1898, Frank G. Shattuck, a salesman for the Schrafft company from Upstate New York, opened a candy store at Broadway and West 36th Street in Manhattan, New York City. His sister, Jane Shattuck, was largely responsible for the introduction of light lunches into the stores.

The first location to serve food was the Syracuse store in 1906. By 1909, Jane introduced meals to the second New York City Schrafft's, at 54 West 23rd Street in the heart of the Ladies' Mile shopping district. By 1927, there were 25 units, mostly in New York City, and by 1928 Schrafft's revenue from lunch sales was US$1 million a month. (Note: US$1,000,000 in 1928 is equivalent to $18,750,000.00 in 2025, according to calculations based on the consumer price index measure of inflation.)

Schrafft's was known for an air of gentility typical of the upper-middle-class home. Cooks, supervisors, and even some executives were women. Menus of the 1920s and 1930s included many salads, more desserts than entrees, and vegetable selections such as creamed cauliflower and fried eggplant.

Rent cuts in the Great Depression encouraged chain expansion, and by 1937 there were 43 Schrafft's, primarily in the New York metropolitan area, and several others in Boston and Philadelphia. In 1939, WPA Guide to New York City said Schrafft's had 38 locations in the metropolitan area, serving American home food. At its peak there were about 50 units in greater New York.

In the late 1960s, the Schrafft's candy company was sold to Helme Products while Pet, Inc. bought the restaurants in 1967 for US$14 million. (Note: US$14 million in 1967 is $135.20 million in 2025, according to calculations based on the consumer price index measure of inflation.) Pet made a renewed effort to renovate Schrafft's image, attract men with men-only sections of the restaurants, and diversify by opening a chain of Schrafft's motels.

In the 1970s, however, the chain dwindled with most restaurant locations closing within the decade. In 1981, the candy company ceased operations while the few restaurants remaining were in various hands.
