= Land-O-Sun =

American dairy product brand

- Product type: Dairy products
- Current owner: Dairy Farmers of America
- Country: Johnson City, Tennessee
- Introduced: 1925
- Website: www.petdairy.com

Land-O-Sun is an American brand of dairy products that was introduced in 1925 in Johnson City, Tennessee. It was acquired in 1998 by Suiza Foods for $224 million. It is currently owned by Dairy Farmers of America and doing business as Pet Dairies.

== Legal issues ==
In 1992, Land-O-Sun entered a guilty plea with the United States Department of Justice, agreeing to pay a $3.5 million fine for public school bid rigging in South Carolina between 1985 and 1988.

In July 1992, Land-O-Sun Dairies emerged from bankruptcy after previously filing for bankruptcy in February 1991.
