= Emmi AG =

Swiss dairy products company

- Type: Public company
- Traded as: SIX: EMMN
- ISIN: CH0012829898
- Industry: Food
- Founded: 1907
- Headquarters: Lucerne, Switzerland
- Area served: Worldwide
- Key people: Konrad Graber (Chairman); Urs Riedener (Group Chief Executive Officer)
- Products: Dairy and vegan dairy alternatives
- Production output: 11 countries (Austria, Brazil, Chile, France, Germany, Italy, Netherlands, Spain, Switzerland, Tunisia, U.S.)
- Services: Exports from Switzerland to around 60 countries
- Revenue: CHF 3,706 million (2020)
- Net income: CHF 188.4 million (adjusted CHF 220.3 million) (2024)
- Owner: 53.2 % of shares held by ZMP Invest AG (cooperative of milk farmers)
- Number of employees: 12200+ (01 März 2025)
- Divisions: Switzerland, Europe, Americas (incl. North Africa), Global Trade (exports from Switzerland)

Emmi AG is a Swiss milk processor and dairy products company headquartered in Lucerne. The company employs a total of 12,000+ people in Europe (including Switzerland), North America (USA and Mexico), South America (Brazil and Chile) and North Africa (Tunisia). Emmi AG is listed on the SWX Swiss Exchange. The company generates about 42.5 percent of its sales locally and the other 57.5 percent abroad. Numerous production companies in Switzerland belong to the Emmi Group. Outside of Switzerland, Emmi has production facilities, in Chile, Germany, Italy, the Netherlands, Austria, Spain, Tunisia, Brazil, Canada and the U.S. Emmi is one of the 500 largest companies in Switzerland.

== History ==
In 1907, 62 cooperatives founded the Zentralschweizerischen Milchverband Luzern (Central Switzerland Milk Association in Lucerne) (MVL). After the incorporation of an association from the canton of Zug, the MVL was renamed to Zentralschweizerischer Milchverband (Central Swiss Milk Association, ZMV) in 1916. In 1947 they produced soft cheese and yoghurt for the first time in Emmen under the brand name Emmi, which was derived from the name of the town. In 1993, the ZMV founded Emmi AG in order to separate commercial activities from association activities. In 1996/1997, Emmi AG was founded as a holding company. In 1998, Emmi Deutschland GmbH was founded and registered in the commercial register the following year. The company's headquarters at the time was in the municipality of Willstätt in Baden-Württemberg.[8] In 1999, the ZMV changed its name to Zentralschweizer Milchproduzenten (Central Swiss Milk Producers, ZMP). In 2021, Thomas Grüter (Die Mitte) became president of ZMP. ZMP is a member of Swiss Milk Producers and the main shareholder of Bergkäserei Marbach AG in Escholzmatt-Marbach. Emmi became the largest milk processor in Switzerland in 2001 through acquisitions, including the Josef Hosp GmbH, with headquarters in Nüziders, which was renamed Emmi Österreich GmbH. In 2002, Emmi took over the cheese business of Swiss Dairy Food in Switzerland and Germany and exported cheese to Russia for the first time. Since December 2004, Emmi has been listed on the SIX Swiss Exchange in the Swiss equities segment.

In 2003, the four processed cheese manufacturers Gerberkäse AG, Chalet Käse AG, Tigerkäse AG and Zingg AG merged to form Emmi Fondue AG, which is a member of the Association of the Swiss Processed Cheese Industry(SESK).

In November 2020, it was announced that Emmi intends to replace the cheese factory in Emmen with a new building. This was completed and commissioned in 2022. In 2021, the Emmi subsidiary Studer invested in a new cheese factory in Hefenhofen. In March 2022, Emmi announced that it had ceased business with Russia following the Russian invasion of Ukraine.

== Products ==
In March 2004, Caffè Latte was added to the Emmi product range. The mixed drink made from milk and coffee is Emmi's most successful branded product. Erich Kienle is considered to be the inventor. Since March 2018, Coop also offers a version in Bio Suisse quality. In April 2019, it was announced that the name Caffè Latte would be replaced by Emmi Republic of Blends for some markets, as the previous name was also used by the competition. With a market share of 17.2%, Emmi is the market leader in Western Europe for cold coffees.

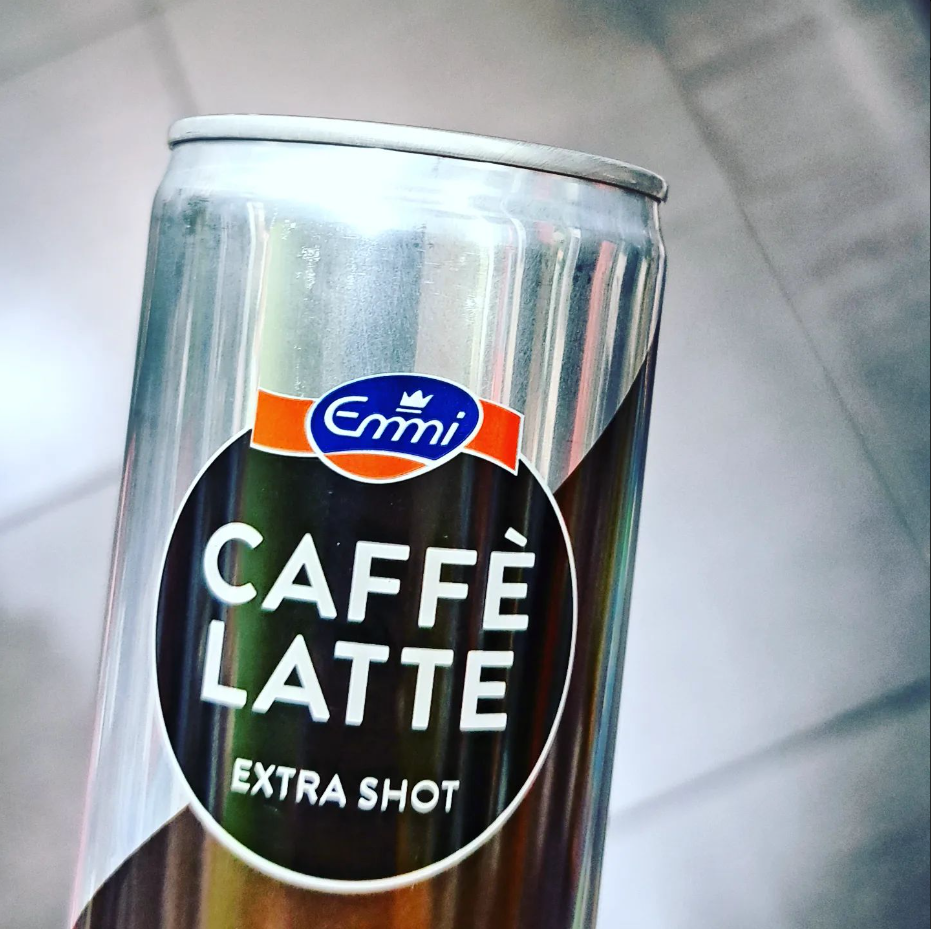
Caffè Latte from Slovenia

In 2010, Emmi entered the business of goat milk by taking over the Le Petit Chevrier brand in Switzerland. Since then, a number of other acquisitions have been made, including Meyenberg Goat Milk and in the sheep milk sector. At the end of 2010, Emmi acquired the trademark rights for Onken from the Oetker Group. In 2019, the Austrian company Leeb, which through the Hale company also sells organic vegan milk substitutes under the MyLove-MyLife brand, was taken over. In 2020, the vegan milk substitutes brand Beleaf was launched. Emmi has been using Swiss oats for its Beleaf oat milk since 2021. While this means the Beleaf oat milks are of IP-Suisse quality, the Coop owned-brand Karma oat milk has been produced from Swiss organic oats since 2023 and is of Bio Suisse quality.

In March 2022, following the Russian invasion of Ukraine, Emmi said it had ceased doing business with Russia. In October 2022, Denner added Emmi's Knospe organic milk to its range. In 2023, Emmi took over the marketing of Sbrinz AOP. In 2023, a new dessert production plant was opened in Campogalliano, Italy.

== Presidents and CEOs ==
From 1993 to 2003, Franz Jung, President of MVL, was President of the Board of Directors. From 2004 to 2009 Fritz Wyss held this position. At the Annual General Meeting on May 20, 2009, Konrad Graber was elected the new Chairman of the Board of Directors of Emmi AG. In 2023 the former CEO Urs Riedener was elected as President of the Board of Directors.

Ricarda Demarmels has been CEO since January 2023. She succeeded Urs Riedener, who had headed the company since March 2008. He was preceded by Walter Huber (2004–2008) and Fritz Wyss (1998–2004).

== Facts and Figures ==
With the collapse of Swiss Dairy Food (SDF) in mid-2002, Emmi became the leading food group in the Swiss dairy industry, followed by Cremo, Hochdorf, Estavayer Lait and Züger Frischkäse. By 2024, Emmi had subsidiaries in 15 countries. In 2020, the company employed almost 8,700 people, more than two-thirds of them abroad. In 2024, net sales by product group were:

- 29.0% cheese
- 25.6% dairy products
- 29.6% fresh produce
- 5.9% cream cheese
- 4.4% powder/concentrates
- 5.5% other products/services

In 2008, the foreign share of sales, with exports from Switzerland and products manufactured by foreign subsidiaries, was 23 percent and increased to 57 percent by 2021. In contrast, sales in Switzerland have fallen by around a fifth since 2008. Since the IPO in 2004, the share price has increased from 100 to over 1,000 francs.

== Company acquisitions and sales ==
=== Switzerland ===
Date	Company	Revenue (At the time of acquisition)	Number of employees
July 2020	Acquisition of Chäs Hütte Zollikon GmbH from Baumann Käse AG, part of the Emmi Group.		
April 2019	Sale of Emmi Frisch-Service AG (CH).	approx. 110 million CHF	approx. 160
July 2016	Complete takeover of Mittelland Molkerei, Suhr (CH) (previously 60%).	approx. 500 million CHF	approx. 350
April 2013	Acquisition of Käserei Studer AG (CH).	approx. 20 million CHF	approx. 24 employees
March 2013	Resale of the 60% interest in Nutrifrais SA (CH) to LRG Groupe SA.		
July 2011	Acquisition of Rutz Käse AG (CH). Deleted in 2013.	approx. 40 million CHF	approx. 40 employees
May 2011	Complete takeover of the Molkerei Biedermann (CH) (previously a minority interest) deleted in 2023 and Molkerei Biedermann, a branch of Emmi Schweiz AG, was created.		approx. 110 employees
September 2010	Purchase of the property, building and production facilities of the former Regio Milch beider Basel AG (CH) (together with the Milchverband der Nordwestschweiz). Emmi holds 80% of the new Regio Molkerei beider Basel AG, MIBA 20%.		
July 2010	Acquisition Fromalp (CH).	approx. 100 million CHF	approx. 150 employees
April 2009	60% stake in Nutrifrais SA (CH) from LRG Groupe SA.	approx. 2 million CHF	
June 2008	Sale of the stake in Baer AG (CH) to Lactalis (F).		
June 2008	Baumann Käse AG, part of Emmi Group, acquires Chäsbueb AG.		
January 2008	Acquisition of Walter Schmitt AG (CH).		
January 2003	Takeover of former Swiss Dairy Food operations in Ostermundigen (CH).		
January 2003	Acquisition of Tiger Käse AG (CH).		
2002/2003	Takeover Gerberkäse AG (CH).		
June 2002	Takeover of Chäs Renz Schilling AG (CH).	CHF 2 million	
2001	Takeover of Zingg AG (CH).		
January 2001	Takeover of Burra AG (CH).		
2001	Acquisition of Baumann Käse AG		
2000	35% participation in Baer AG (CH).		
1998	Acquisition of the Coop Cheese Center		
1998	Acquisition of the cheese trading company Gebrüder Joost AG		

In 2000, Emmi acquired 35% of Baer AG, founded by Edwin Baer, and sold the shares to Lactalis in 2008. In 2003, the four processed cheese manufacturers Gerberkäse AG, Chalet Käse AG, Tigerkäse AG, and Zingg AG merged to form Emmi Fondue AG. This, in turn, is a member of the Swiss Processed Cheese Industry Association (SESK). In 2010, Fromalp AG in Zollikofen was acquired by Hochland SE. In 2016, the Mittelland Molkerei AG (MIMO) in Suhr with an annual turnover of around 500 million Swiss francs was fully acquired. It was founded in 2005 as a merger of the Emmi subsidiary Butterzentrale Luzern with the AZM Aargauer Zentralmolkerei (formerly part of the Aargau Milk Association). From the outset, Emmi held a 60% stake in MIMO, AZM Verwaltungs AG (a subsidiary of the Genossenschaft Milchproduzenten Mittelland (MPM); formed in 2007 from the Aargauer Milchverband; its president is the former mayor of Suhr, Marco Genoni) held 40%. For the sale of all shares, the cooperative received a cash share and further shares in Emmi AG. In 2019, Emmi Frisch-Service AG was sold to the Transgourmet Group.

=== International ===
Date	Company	Revenue (At the time of acquisition)	Number of employees
2024	Emmi acquires the Mademoiselle Desserts Group (France).	approx. EUR 420 million	approx. 2000
August 2023	Emmi sells the Gläserne Molkerei, with locations in Dechow and Münchehofe, to Mutares.		
July 2023	Emmi sells its 25% stake in Ambrosi S.p.A. (ITA) to Lactalis (France).		
2022	Emmi sells, subject to the approval of the responsible competition authorities, their 25% stake in Ambrosi S.p.A. (ITA) to Lactalis (F).		
December 2020	Emmi sells its 80% stake in Spanish Lácteos Caprinos S.A. to Lácteas García Baquero S.A.	approx. 10 million EUR	approx. 50
October 2020	Emmi takes over 87.7% of the shares in the US American Indulge Desserts Intermediate Holdings, LLC. Since the closing, this has been trading under Emmi Dessert USA	approx. 80-90 million USD	approx. 350
August 2020	Increase in stake in Bettinehoeve (NED) from 60% to 90%. The increase in stake in Bettinehoeve also affects Emmi's stake in Goat Milk Powder (GMP), the joint venture between Bettinehoeve and AVH dairy, another Dutch subsidiary of Emmi. Emmi now holds 80.9% of the shares in GMP.		approx. 115
October 2019	Acquisition of the Italian Pasticceria Quadrifoglio.	approx. 19 million EUR	approx. 90
October 2019	Increase in stake in Brazilian Laticínios Porto Alegre Indústria e Comércio S.A. from 40% to 70%.	approx. 630 million BRL (160 million CHF)	approx. 1250
October 2019	Acquisition of a 66% stake in Leeb Biomilch GmbH based in Wartberg an der Krems (AUT).	approx. 15 million EUR	approx. 50
January 2019	Purchase of additional production facility in Seymour, Wisconsin (USA).		approx. 50
July 2018	Increase in the stake in Emmi Ambrosi France (FRA) from 51% to 85%.	approx. 80 million CHF	
July 2018	Increase in stake in AVH Dairy Trade B.V. (NED) from 75% to 90%.	approx. 35 million EUR	
January 2018	Increase in stake in Centrale Laitière de Mahdia (TUN) to 54.7%.	approx. 140 million CHF	approx. 785
January 2018	Sale of 22% stake to The Icelandic Milk and Skyr Corporation (USA).		approx. 50
January 2017	Acquisition of Italian Fresh Foods S.p.A. (ITA).	approx. 20 million EUR	approx. 70
January 2017	Acquisition of Jackson-Mitchell, Inc. (USA).	approx. 20 million USD	approx. 30
December 2016	80% stake in Lácteos Caprinos S.A. (ESP).	approx. 13 million EUR	approx. 30
May 2016	Increase in stake in Surlat S.A. group (CL) from 60% to 72%.	approx. 90 million CHF	
February 2016	60% stake in Bettinehoeve (NED).	approx. 40 million EUR	approx. 115
February 2016	Increased stake in Goat Milk Powder (NED) from 50% to 60%.		
January 2016	Complete takeover of Gläserne Molkerei (DEU) (previously 76%).	approx. 100 million EUR	approx. 100
2016	Acquisition of Cowgirl Creamery Corporation (USA).	approx. 20 million USD	approx. 95
December 2015	Acquisition of Redwood Farm & Creamery (USA).	approx. 22 million USD	approx. 70 employees
January 2015	Acquisition of cheese business J.L. Freeman (CAD).	approx. 35 million CHF	approx. 20 employees
December 2014	Full takeover of Emmi Fondue AG (CH) (previously 65%).		
December 2014	Sale of Emmi Penn Yan (USA).	approx. 30 million USD	
October 2014	Sale of Trentinalatte (ITA).		
August 2014	Increase in the stake in the Gläserne Molkerei (DE) from 24% to 76%.		
January 2014	50% stake in Mexideli 2000 Holding SA de CV (MEX).	approx. USD 50 million USD	approx. 250 employees
December 2013	25% stake in The Icelandic Milk and Skyr Corporation (USA).	approx. 17 million EUR	
July 2013	Acquisition of Rachelli (ITA).	approx. 25 million EUR	approx. 85 employees
January 2013	70% stake in AVH Dairy Trade (NED).	approx. 16.5 million EUR	
October 2012	24% stake in Gläserne Molkerei (DE).		
August 2012	Increase of stake in Venchiaredo S.p.A. (ITA) from 10% to 26%.		approx. 85 employees
July 2012	Increase of stake in Diprola S.A.S. (FRA) to 63% (previously 25%, with Ambrosi Emmi France).	approx. 80 million EUR	approx. 140 employees
July 2012	Increase in the stake in Kaiku Corporación Alimentaria (ESP) from 42.6% to 66%.	approx. 320 million EUR	approx. 100 employees
June 2011	Acquisition A-27 S.p.A. (ITA).	approx. 65 million EUR	approx. 230 employees
August 2010	Acquisition of Cypress Grove Chevre (USA).	approx. 10 million USD	approx. 45 employees
August 2010	Full takeover of CASP LLC (later Emmi Penn Yan) (USA).	approx. 6 million USD	approx. 20 employees
January 2010	25% stake in Diprola (FRA).		
January 2010	10% stake in Venchiaredi S.p.A (ITA).		
January 2009	Acquisition of Roth Käse USA Ltd (USA).	approx. 90 million USD	approx. 125 employees
January 2009	Increase in stake in Kaiku Corporación Alimentaria (ESP) to 42.6%.		
January 2008	Acquisition of Haerten & Interimex SA (BE).		
2007	25% stake in Ambrosi S.p.A (ITA).		
July 2006	Acquisition of Trentinalatte S.p.A. (ITA).		
January 2006	Minority stake in Kaiku Corporación Alimentaria (ESP).		
January 2004	Acquisition of Craamer (NED).		

In 2014, Emmi expanded its activities in the Latin American market by acquiring 50% of the Mexican cheese importer Mexideli. The loss-making Italian yogurt producer Trentinalatte (recent sales of CHF 43 million) was sold to the industrial holding company Livia, owned by financial investor Peter Löw. At the end of 2016, Emmi acquired 80% of the Spanish goat milk processor Lácteos Caprinos and sold it again at the end of 2020. In July 2019, the purchase of the Italian Pasticceria Quadrifoglio was announced; the completion of the transaction is still subject to approval by the relevant competition authorities. In 2021, it was announced that Emmi, subject to approval by the relevant competition authorities, intends to acquire Athenos, the number one in the US feta market, from Lactalis.

== Distribution of shares ==
Holding shares in Emmi AG (as of the end of 2024, nominal capital):

- ZMP Invest AG 53.3%
- Zentralschweizer Käsermeister Genossenschaft 4.0%
- MIBA Genossenschaft 3.1%
- Other 39.6%

In June 2025, the Miba Genossenschaft sold 110,000 registered shares. On 3 May 2024, UBS Fund Management (Switzerland) AG reported a 3.322% stake. Capital Group Companies Inc. reported a 5.019% stake as of 7 June 2016.

== Miscellaneous ==
- In 2012, Emmi received more than 43 million francs from the federal treasury solely for the Verkäsungszulage (Cheesemaking bonus).
- Emmi is heavily involved in the processing trade. For example, in 2020 Emmi imported more than 100 tonnes of butter in order to then process it and export it again as cheese spread.
- The use of the Nutri-Score for Emmi Caffe Latte products led to criticism, as these were awarded a green B despite their high sugar content. The BLV is searching for a solution. Meanwhile, Emmi announced that it would no longer use the Nutri-Score for new products.

== See also ==
- Swiss cheeses and dairy products
