= Enfamil =

Infant formula brand

- Product type: Infant formula
- Current owner: Mead Johnson
- Produced by: Reckitt
- Country: United States
- Introduced: October 5, 1959
- Markets: Worldwide (more than 60 countries)
- Ambassadors: Ashley Tisdale; Erin Andrews; Jesse Tyler Ferguson
- Tagline: "Fuels a World of Possibilities"
- Website: enfamil.com

Enfamil (a play on words of 'infant meal') is an American brand of infant formula that is made by Mead Johnson, a subsidiary of Reckitt. From 1989 through 2011, Mead Johnson used Beatrix Potter's Peter Rabbit on its U.S. packaging. However, in 2012, the company transitioned to its signature duck across its U.S. Enfamil product line. Enfamil is a product name associated with formulas for babies.

== History ==
This baby formula brand was put on the market on October 5, 1959, by the Mead Johnson company as "a low protein duplication of mother's milk". The corporation had been founded in 1905 in New Jersey by Edward Mead Johnson and then relocated to Evansville, Indiana in 1915. Enfamil R was Mead Johnson's first routine infant formula designed to be a nutritional formula based on the pattern of human milk. Since then, Mead Johnson has produced a broad variation of Enfamil Products.

== Ingredients ==
The types of ingredients used in Enfamil R vary, based on the type of formula. The base of each formula may vary extensively, but Enfamil provides different formulae for different infants needs.

While many of the ingredients in Enfamil meet with considerable approval, a growing number of watch groups point to ingredients that might not be safe. According to the United States Food and Drug Administration, test results have shown that traces of cyanuric acid have been found in Enfamil Lipil With Iron, however, the products still are approved by the FDA due to small consumption levels, being considered tolerable.
