= Elsa Group =

Swiss food company

Elsa Group SA
- Industry: Dairy
- Founded: 1955
- Headquarters: Estavayer-le-Lac FR, Switzerland
- Key people: Matthew Robin (Company director)
- Revenue: 657 mln. CHF (2005)
- Number of employees: 696 (2022)
- Website: www.migrosindustrie.ch

The Elsa Group SA (previously known as Estavayer Lait SA, ELSA for short), based in Estavayer-le-Lac, is a company belonging to the Swiss retail group Migros that produces dairy products and colonial goods. In the 2005 financial year, the company had 622 employees and achieved 657 million francs in sales. The products are primarily manufactured for the Migros cooperatives and sold in their stores; a selection of products are sold abroad under Migros’s export label Swiss Delice. The Elsa Group is one of the largest dairies in Switzerland and one of its 500 largest companies.

== History ==
In 1955, the Migros-Genossenschafts-Bund (Migros Cooperative Association) founded the company Conserves Estavayer SA (CESA), which from 1956 canned peas, beans, pickled cucumber, spinach and jam. The production of dairy products began in 1960, where Migros competed against organized dairies. CESA was the first Swiss company to begin packaging pasteurized milk in Tetra Paks in 1968. Over the years, CESA gradually divested itself of almost all business areas (selling to sister companies) with the exception of milk processing and changed its name to Estavayer Lait SA (ELSA) in 1998. The changeover was completed in 2003 with the conversion of the headquarters in Estavayer-le-Lac into ELSA's central production and logistics location and the closure of all other locations.

The ELSA-Mifroma Group was founded in 1999. In 2010, a stake was acquired in Schwyzer Milchhuus AG. In 2016, ELSA took over the majority of the company Idhéa in Hochfelden, Alsace. The production of salad and other sauces were gradually relocated there from Estavayer-le-Lac in the beginning of 2018. In 2017, ELSA increased its stake in Schwyzer Milchhuus AG from 34 to 60 percent, thereby taking over the majority in the central Swiss family business founded in 1899. At the end of 2017, ELSA and Migros left the Branchenorganisation Milch (BOM, Milk Industry Organization).

In mid-2019, ELSA took over SoFine Foods, located in the province of Limburg, Netherlands, which had belonged to Alpro since 2006. SoFine Foods produces vegan meat substitute products, including the Migros Cornatur brand. Until 2019, ELSA and the Migros Aare cooperative, together with Aaremilch AG, had built a new milk bottling plant in the municipality of Diemtigen. At the end of 2019, IP-Suisse-Wiesenmilch, which at the time was still produced by Emmi in Suhr, was to be bottled there. In 2022, 50% of Aaremilch AG and 100% of Simmental Switzerland AG were acquired. ELSA also produces for direct competitors, including Coop.

In 2023, Estavayer Lait SA was renamed Elsa Group SA and the Mifroma SA was merged into the group. Dörig Käsehandel AG (Dörig cheese trade AG) in Wittenbach also belongs to the Elsa Group. The Elsa Group is a member of IG Bio.

== Products ==
Elsa Group's products include milk, milk drinks, cream, yogurts, cheese, cream cheese, quark and milk-based desserts. other goods which they produces include mayonnaise, salad dressings, fresh barbecue- and sidedish sauces and vinegar.
