= MIBA Genossenschaft =

Swiss Cooperative

- Type: cooperative
- Industry: Dairy
- Founded: 1905
- Key people: Andreas Gugger (CEO); Thomas Springer (President)
- Website: https://mibabasel.ch/

The MIBA Genossenschaft (MIBA cooperative, formerly MIBA Milchverband der Nordwestschweiz) based in Aesch is a cooperative with around 1,200 members from six cantons in northwestern Switzerland (AG, BL, BS, BE, JU, SO). The members are all dairy farmers who produce milk for Genossenschaft mooh (Mooh Cooperative) or a MIBA-accredited cheese or dairy factory. MIBA is a member of the Schweizer Milchproduzenten (Swiss Milk Producers) and is involved in the export company Lactofama, which was founded in 2014.

Boris Beuret has been on the board since 2009 and has held the position as president from 2019 to 2023. Christophe Eggenschwiler was managing director of MIBA from 2009 to 2022, when he moved to IP-Suisse to become managing director.

== Genossenschaft mooh ==
In April 2016, it was decided to merge the MIBA milk trading activities with Nordostmilch AG. While Nordostmilch would be liquidated after the merger, the MIBA cooperative remained in existence after the milk trade had been outsourced to the Genossenschaft mooh. All milk producers remain members of MIBA, even if they deliver their milk to mooh in the future. This made mooh the new market leader in the Swiss milk trade. mooh merged the trading and marketing of organic raw milk with Biomilchpool GmbH in April 2018. Prolait’s milk trading business and its industrial milk marketing was also taken over beginning 1 January 2018. In 2017, mooh exported almost 5 million litres of milk, mainly in the form of cheese, to China, after trade agreements nearly halved tariffs on cheese. In April 2019, the SVP politician and farmer Martin Hübscher was elected the new president of mooh. Despite some critical opinions, Fenaco's Urs Feuz was also elected to the board on the same day. The previous president was Robert Bischofberger, who also was president of Nordostmilch from 2005 until the merger with MIBA.[14] The first managing director was Christophe Eggenschwiler (2016 to 2017), followed by Eugen Luz (2017 to 2019) and René Schwager (since 2019). In 2021, 2925 farms produced milk for mooh.

== Fromagerie des Franches-Montagnes ==
From spring 2017, a new cheese dairy, including a show dairy, was built near Le Noirmont with the support of the Swiss federal government and the canton of Jura. The dairy was officially opened in April 2019 and is primarily used to produce the cheeses Tête de Moine and Gruyère.
