= Mead Johnson =

Food and drink company of the United States, division of Reckitt

Mead Johnson & Company, LLC
- Type: Subsidiary (LLC)
- Traded as: NYSE: MJN (2009–2017)
- Industry: Pediatric nutrition
- Founded: 1905; 121 years ago
- Founder: Edward Mead Johnson
- Headquarters: Evansville, Indiana
- Area served: Worldwide
- Key people: Aditya Sehgal, EVP Infant and Child Nutrition
- Number of employees: 7,500 (2017)
- Parent: Reckitt
- Website: www.meadjohnson.com

Mead Johnson & Company, LLC is an American company that is a manufacturer of infant formula, both domestically and globally, with its best-known product Enfamil. It operates as an independent subsidiary of Reckitt.

The company dates back to a firm created by Edward Mead Johnson, one of the co-founders of Johnson & Johnson, who created his own business in 1895, which was renamed Mead Johnson & Company in 1905. The company was majority owned by Bristol-Myers Squibb after an acquisition in 1967, but was spun-off in 2009 as an independent firm. Almost all products are used by infants and children under 7 except Enfaschool which covers students from childhood to youth under 15 years.

In the year ending December 31, 2016, Mead Johnson reported net sales of $3.7 million, of which 50% was generated in Asia, 17% in Latin America and 33% in North America/Europe. For the same time period, the company reported total assets of $4.8 billion.

In February 2017, British consumer goods company Reckitt (then known as Reckitt Benckiser) bid $16.7 billion for the company. In June 2017, MJN announced that its merger with RB had been completed, which meant that MJN's common stock was no longer traded on the New York Stock Exchange.

== History and products ==
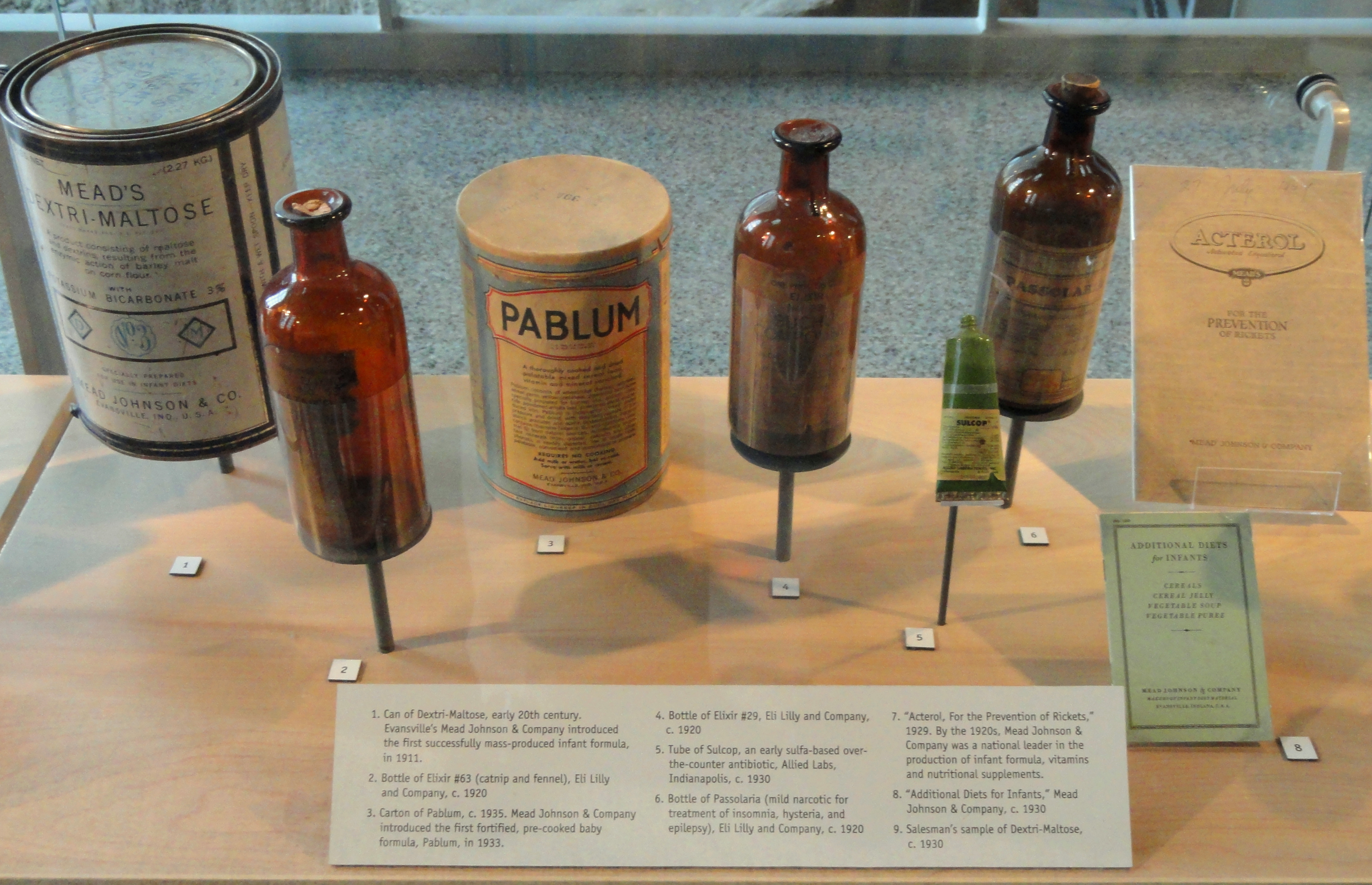
Dextri-Maltose and Pablum, early Mead Johnson products

Edward Mead Johnson co-founded Johnson & Johnson in 1886 together with his brothers. In 1895, Johnson developed a side business called The American Ferment Company to create a digestive aid. In 1897, E. Mead Johnson left the family business to go out into business on his own in Jersey City, New Jersey, and in 1905, the company was re-established as Mead Johnson & Company. The firm's first major infant formula was developed in 1910, and Dextri-Maltose, a carbohydrate-based milk modifier was introduced in 1911, making it the first American product for infants to be clinically approved and recommended by doctors. The firm moved to Evansville, Indiana, in 1915, in the wake of World War I, as part of an effort to have easier access to the raw agricultural ingredients that were needed for its products, which required Johnson to build a series of new plants and factories to replace the ones he had left behind in New Jersey.

After Edward Mead Johnson died in 1934, Lambert Mead Johnson succeeded his father as president and served in the position until 1955, making him the longest-serving president in company history. His son, D. Mead Johnson was the third generation of the family to serve as chief executive of the firm. During his tenure, which lasted from 1955 until the firm's takeover by Bristol-Myers in 1968, the firm's annual sales tripled to $131 million and grew to nearly 4,400 employees.

=== Acquisition and spin-off from Bristol-Myers ===
Bristol-Myers reached agreement in August 1964 for an acquisition deal under which Mead Johnson would be acquired, with shareholders receiving a mix of common and preferred stock in a deal valued at $240 million. Mead Johnson's net sales in 1966 were $131 million with earnings of $7.3 million.

Bristol-Myers announced in February 2009 that it was going to spin off Mead Johnson to focus on its primary pharmaceutics business, with an initial public offering estimated to bring in $562.5 million and would leave Bristol-Myers with 90% ownership of the firm. A plan offered in November 2009 would allow shareholders of Bristol-Myers to exchange one dollar of stock in that company for $1.11 worth of shares in Mead Johnson for the 133.5 million shares in the firm, which would value the company at $7.7 billion based on the stock's then current closing price. The stock swap was intended to provide a tax-free exchange. CEO James M. Cornelius of Bristol-Myers said that "With a successful execution of this split-off, we fully consider ourselves a BioPharma company".

=== Acquisition by Reckitt Benckiser ===
Reckitt Benckiser announced in February 2017 that it was in advanced negotiations to acquire Mead Johnson. On February 10, 2017, Reckitt Benckiser Group announced it had agreed to buy Mead Johnson Nutrition Co. for $16.6 billion.

Reckitt Benckiser's intention was to acquire Mead Johnson Nutrition for $90 per share in cash. In order to effect the transaction, RB incorporated a subsidiary in Delaware into which Mead Johnson Nutrition has merged, with Mead Johnson Nutrition being the surviving entity at completion.

Mead Johnson announced in June 2017, that the final regulator approval to complete the acquisition had been received, after which the merger was completed and Mead Johnson became the Infant Formula and Child Nutrition (IFCN) Division of Reckitt Benckiser.

=== Acquisition by Primavera Capital Group ===
In 2021, Primavera Capital Group, a Chinese company, acquired the infant formula and child nutrition business of Mead Johnson Nutrition Company in China from Reckitt Benckiser Group plc at an implied enterprise value of $2.2 billion, in a deal in which Reckitt retained an 8% shareholding.
