= Pet, Inc. =

Former American branded foods company

- Formerly: Helvetia Milk Condensing Co. (1885–1923); Pet Milk Co. (1923–1966)
- Type: Private
- Industry: Dairy
- Founded: 1885; 141 years ago in Highland, Illinois
- Founder: John Meyenberg
- Defunct: 1995; 31 years ago
- Fate: Acquired by Pillsbury, becoming a brand
- Headquarters: St. Louis, Missouri, United States
- Products: Evaporated milk
- Parent: IC Industries (1978–1988); Whitman Corp. (1988–1991)
- Subsidiaries: Hussmann Refrigerator (1966–1978); William Underwood Company (1982–1995)
- Website: PET Milk; PET Dairy

Pet, Inc., was an American company that was the first to commercially produce evaporated milk as a shelf-stable consumer product with its "PET Milk" brand. While evaporated milk was popular before refrigerators were common in homes, sales peaked in the 1950s and it is now a niche product used in baking and as a cooking ingredient.

PET anticipated this change and starting in the 1950s became a multi-brand food products conglomerate through a series of acquisitions. This gave it ownership of consumer brands like Old El Paso Mexican foods, Progresso soups, Whitman's chocolates, Underwood canned meats, and others. Pet was a subsidiary of multi-industry conglomerate IC Industries between 1978 and 1991 when it once again became independent.

Pet ceased independent operations in 1995 when it was acquired by the Pillsbury Company with "PET" becoming a Pillsbury brand. When Pillsbury was acquired by General Mills in 2001, the PET brand was sold to International Multifoods to avoid antitrust concerns. Multifoods in turn was acquired by J.M. Smucker in 2004 who spun off its US sweetened condensed and evaporated milk operations, including PET, as Eagle Family Foods Group in 2014.

The "PET" trademark is owned by Eagle who still produce the PET Milk brand of evaporated milk. Eagle also licenses the PET trademark to the Dairy Farmers of America (DFA) farmers cooperative who use the "PET Dairy" brand as a regional tradename for fresh and processed dairy products sold in the Southeastern United States.

== History ==
=== Background ===
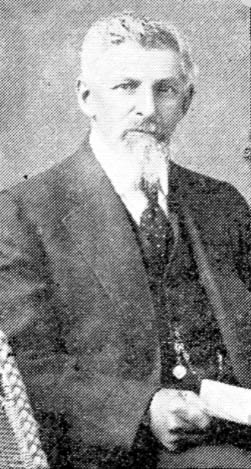
John B. Meyenberg, founder

John Baptist Meyenberg (1847–1914) was an operator at the Anglo-Swiss milk condensery at Cham, Switzerland. Anglo-Swiss made sweetened condensed milk. From 1866 through 1883, Meyenberg experimented with preservation of milk without the use of sugar. He discovered that condensed milk would last longer if heated to 120 °C (248 °F) in a sealed container, and hence could be preserved without adding sugar. When Anglo-Swiss declined to implement Meyenberg's work, he resigned from the company and emigrated to the United States. John Meyenberg first moved to St. Louis, but soon relocated to Highland, Illinois, due to its large Swiss population. On 25 November 1884, U.S. Patents 308,421 (Apparatus for Preserving Milk) and 308,422 (Process for Preserving Milk) were issued to Meyenberg.

=== Founding ===
Meyenberg associated with various local merchants in Highland, many of Swiss background, and starting in December 1884 had a series of meetings with John Wildi, Dr. John Knoebel, and Adolph Glock. On February 14, 1885, they founded the Helvetia Milk Condensing Company, named after the Latin word for Switzerland, with US$15,000 in funds collected from other local farmers and businessmen including Louis Latzer, George Roth, and Fred Kaeser. Knoebel was named president and Wildi secretary and treasurer. Roth, Latzer, and Kaeser took director roles with Meyenberg as superintendent of manufacturing.

Production of Helvetia's first product, "Highland Evaporated Cream" unsweetened condensed milk, started on June 14, 1885, in an old, converted wool factory. They were soon processing 300 gallons of raw milk a day. But, on July 8, 1885, the steam-powered sterilizer exploded and the company ceased operations for a month for repairs.

Production restarted in August 1885 and by the end of the year, Helvetia's evaporated milk was beginning to gain recognition in the Southern US. Its reputation was boosted after it donated 10 cases to victims of a fire in Galveston, Texas, and a grocer in El Paso, Texas, ordered 100 cases after crediting it with helping to bring his sick infant back to health.

However, throughout its first year the company experienced a number of setbacks. The new equipment required frequent adjustment, the factory was short of water and the company had to drill a number of additional wells, and, most concerning, cases of its milk began spoiling on store shelves. Production was halted several times to deal with these issues and much of the blame was placed on Meyenberg. He was asked to take a reduced salary until the issues were resolved. Although he believed that the cause of the spoilage was inadequately sealed cans, others claimed that Meyenberg's sterilization process was to blame. Meyenberg refused to accept a reduced salary and left the company in August 1886. He went on to assist Elbridge Amos Stuart in producing Carnation Evaporated Milk in 1899.

At Helvetia, Latzer, who had resigned within a year of the company's founding, rejoined and assumed the role of technical director and president. Latzer had both a college degree and an education in chemistry and went to work to determine the cause of the spoilage. Assisted by Dr. Werner Schmidt, Wildi, and Knoebel, all of whom had studied chemistry, the company determined that the spoilage had been caused by bacteria and resolved the problem. During the investigation, Latzer made improvements to Helvetia's operations, automating its plant and improving production speed and safety in the process.

=== Successful production ===
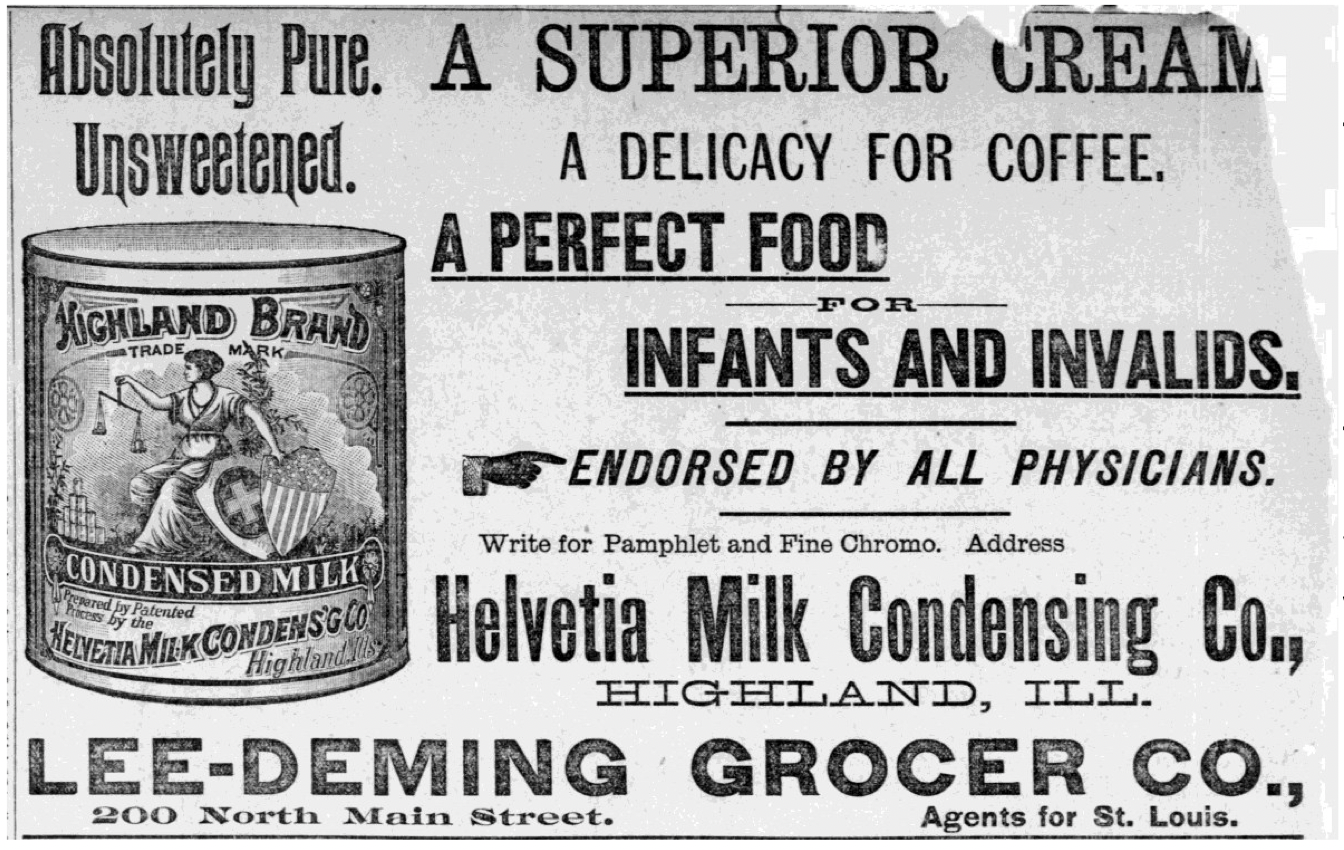
An 1889 advertisement for Highland Condensed Milk in the St. Louis Post-Dispatch

By 1890, they had resolved the spoilage issue and Helvetia began growing nationally and internationally. Wildi led the company's marketing efforts and, after seeing the benefits from its actions after the Galveston fire, one major strategy was to send in free product following natural disasters. Particular focus regions for marketing were the Southern US where fresh milk spoiled quickly in the heat and mining regions in the Western US where it was scarce.

The company exhibited its products at international events including the Paris Exposition of 1889 and the World's Columbian Exposition in Chicago in 1893. A major aspect of the company's marketing under Wildi in the 1890s was to promote it as an infant formula, particularly as a better alternative to sweetened condensed milk which had previously been one of the only alternatives to breastfeeding. Sales began to slow in the 1890s, however, with competing products entering the market. In response, Wildi convinced the company to launch the "Economy" brand which sold alongside their Highland brand.

The "Our Pet Evaporated Cream" brand was introduced when a New Orleans food broker asked Helvetia for a can priced at 5¢ and sized to fill a baby bottle. Helvetia registered "Our PET" as a trademark in 1895 and by 1907 it had eclipsed the Highland and Economy brands to become the company's best seller.

=== Contested management ===
Just after the turn of the century, disputes between Latzer and Wildi on the direction of the company began to become more prominent. By 1906, they were two of only three stockholders in the company with the third being Kaeser. One aspect of the increased tensions was related to the number of family connections within the company. John Flournoy Montgomery, who had married Wildi's only child, Hedwig, in 1904, was hired as an advertising executive in 1905 or 1906. Latzer disliked Montgomery. After Kaeser's son, Albert, married Latzer's daughter, Mary Jane, in 1906, Latzer and Kaeser became a voting bloc, often opposing Wildi.

At the 1907 annual meeting of the company, Wildi was forced out of daily operations and was no longer the secretary and treasurer. He still owned over 33% of the company's stock and so was still a member of its board but in 1907 the board passed new laws which forbade board members from working in the milk condensing industry.

Despite the new rules, Wildi and Montgomery organized the "John Wildi Evaporated Milk Company" six months after Wildi was forced out. The new company was headquartered in Highland with a factory in Marysville, Ohio. The Helvetia board was outraged at this move but Wildi had enough votes to remain on the board, though he was denied access to meetings. The Wildi family successfully sued the company and, in November 1911, the court ruled that the 1907 change in rules was invalid.

However, Wildi died on February 5, 1910, over a year before the court case was ruled on. He left his stock in Helvetia to his wife Louisa and his stock in the John Wildi Evaporated Milk Company to his daughter. Since the Helvetia stock was no longer owned by someone who held stock in a competing company, the 1907 rule change no longer had any impact on the Wildi family. After John's death, his family attorney, William Nardin, joined Helvetia's board. Louisa Wildi eventually sold her stock in the company in 1923 for US$3,250,000. The John Wildi company, under Montgomery's management after Wildi's death, merged with Nestlé during World War I.

=== Government contracts ===
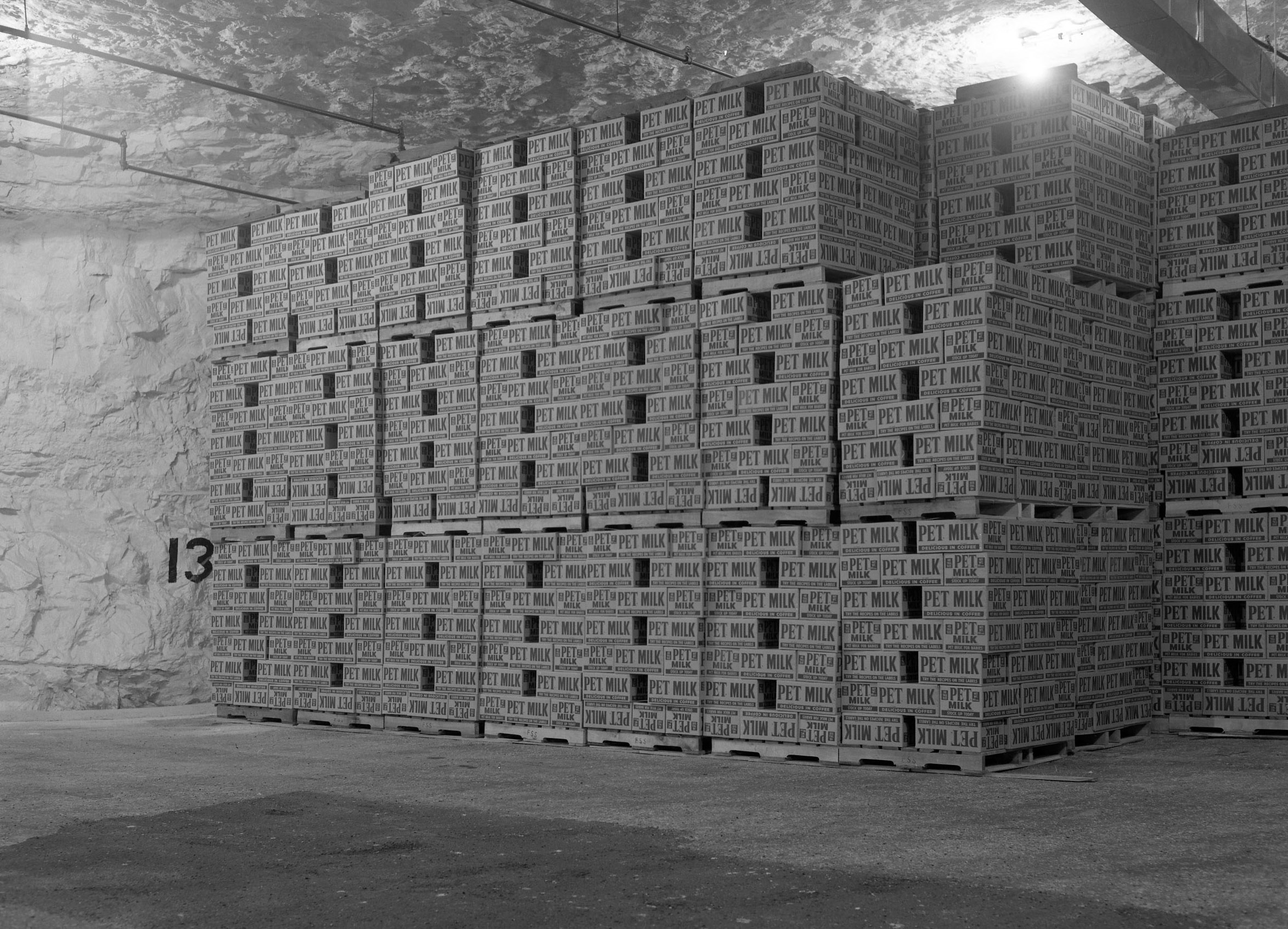
Pet Milk in the Missouri Civil Defense Ozark Terminal Warehouse in the 1950s

Since it was easy to transport and did not spoil, "Our PET" was widely used by the US military, including Teddy Roosevelt's Rough Riders, during the Spanish–American War and World War I. American troops referred to a Helvetia milk can as a "Tin Cow". To fulfill these large government orders, Helvetia built a second plant in Greenville, Illinois and bought and converted a limburger cheese factory in New Glarus, Wisconsin to milk production in 1910. By 1918, it was operating 10 production facilities across the US Midwest, Pennsylvania, and Colorado. Many of these were closed after World War I as government orders tapered off and as a result the company was no longer able to supply buyers in the Western US. In 1919, Pet formed a joint venture with Carnation, General Milk Co., for the purpose of expanding internationally. Pet's share of the venture cost US$875,000.

The company's Highland plant was closed temporarily in 1920 when local farmers went on strike. During a strike in St. Louis, Latzer had sold Helvetia's excess supplies to businessmen in the city when the St. Louis area milk producers association went on strike. Learning of this, the strikers in St. Louis convinced Highland area producers to strike as well.

=== PET Milk Company ===
Helvetia moved its headquarters to St. Louis in 1921 and Louis Latzer's son, John Latzer, took over leadership of the company though the former remained involved with the company. Two years later, Helvetia renamed itself the PET Milk Company after its signature product.

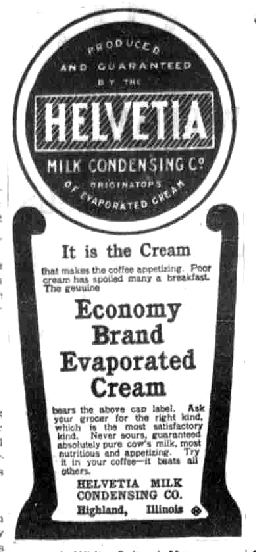
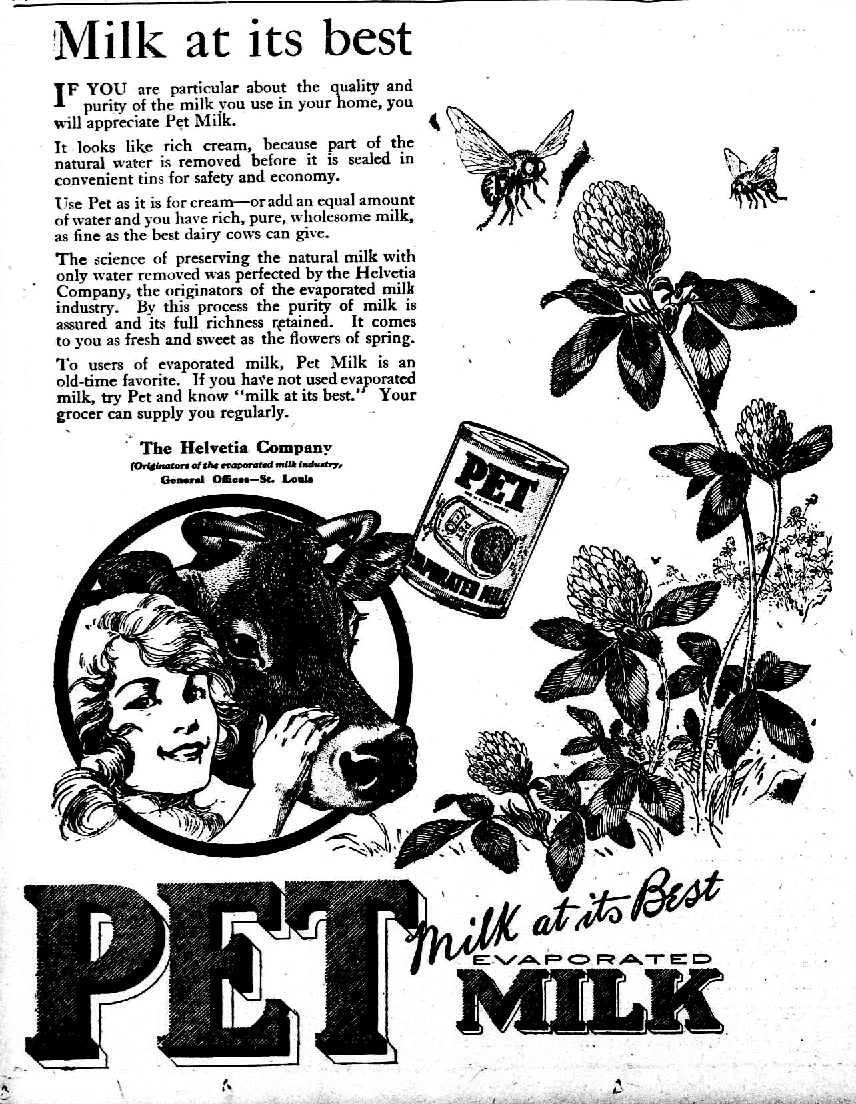
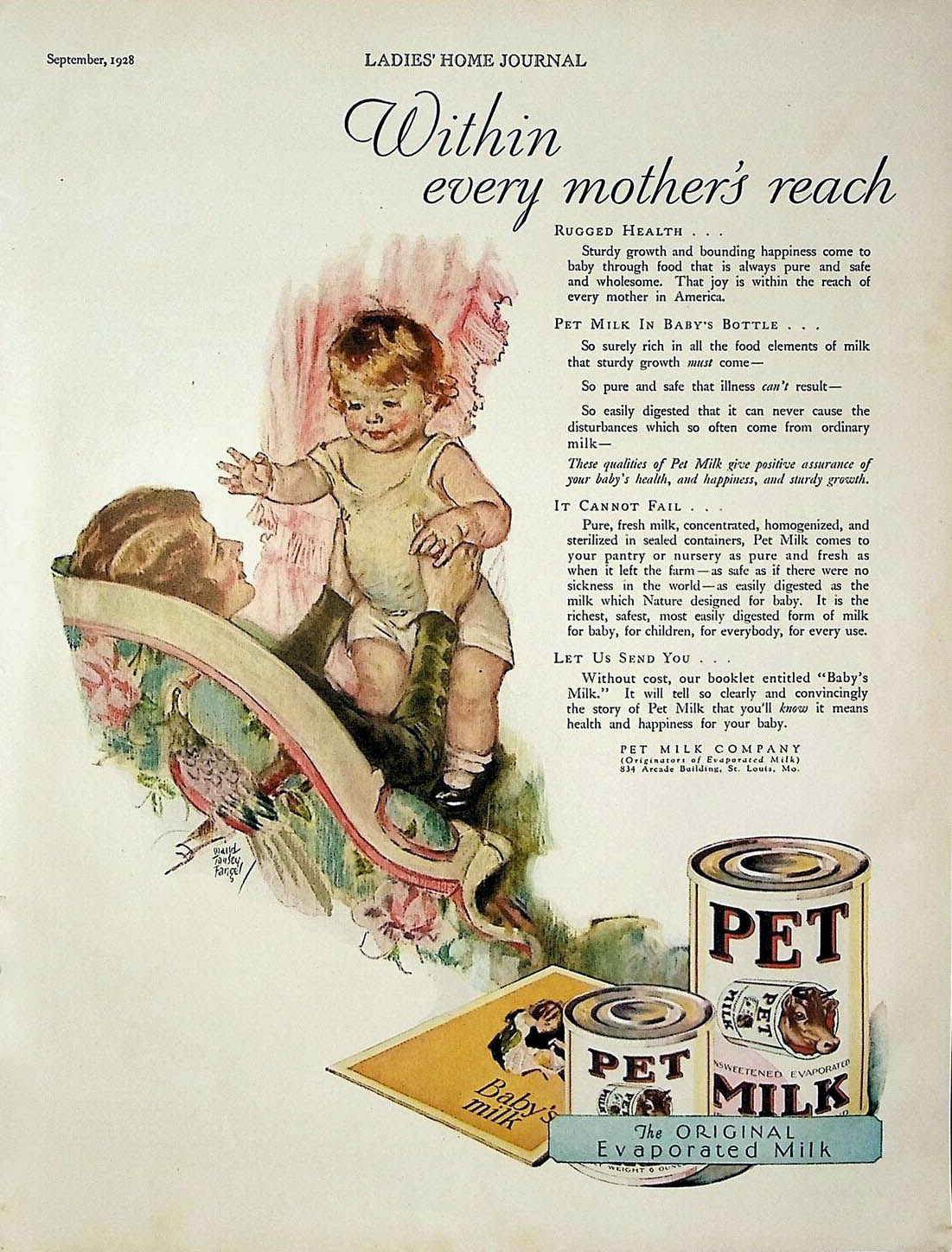
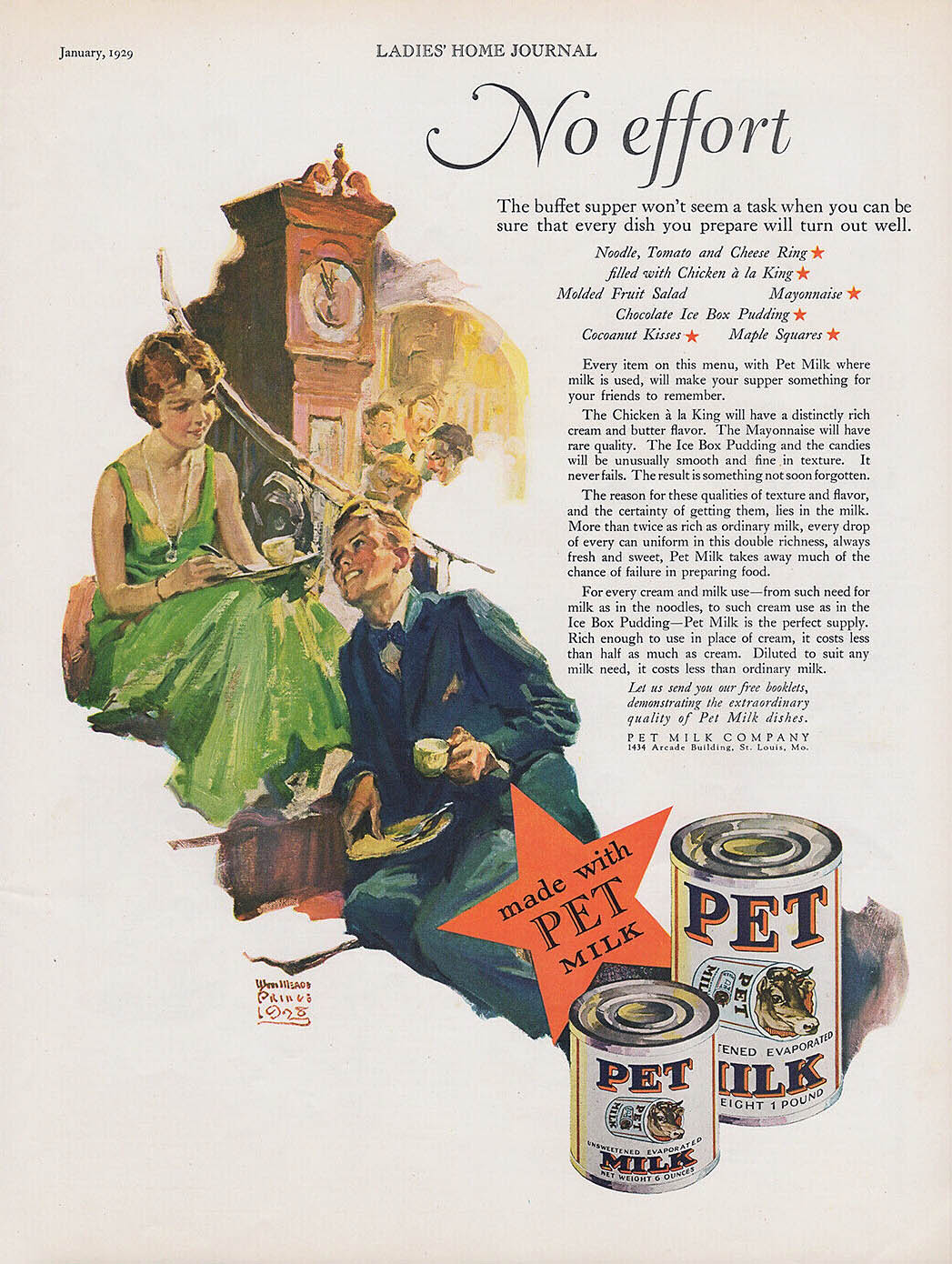
Pet, Inc. advertisements through the years, (above, left): "Helvetia" milk, 1903; (right): "Milk at its best", 1921; (below): "Within every mother's reach" (1928), "No effort", illustrated by William Meade Prince (1929)

In 1925, Pet bought the Sego Milk Products Company of Salt Lake City which restored the company's access to the Western US markets lost after its post-World War I draw-down. The Sego purchase was followed by the acquisition of a Greenville, Illinois ice cream plant and a Johnson City, Tennessee fluid milk processing plant all in the late 1920s.

Following its significant expansion during the 1920s, Pet Milk began trading on the New York Stock Exchange in 1928. The next year, it established a subsidiary, "Pet Dairy Products Company", to start selling fluid milk produced at its newly-acquired Johnson City plant.

After Louis Latzer died in 1924, John Latzer put Nardin in charge of sales and marketing. Nardin convinced his friend, copywriter Erma Proetz, to take over the Pet account at its advertising agency, Gardner Advertising Company. Proetz began a successful campaign promoting Pet Milk in Ladies' Home Journal in May 1927 followed by creating the "Pet Milk test kitchen" developing recipes and extensive marketing around the concept.

Most notable of her marketing efforts was Proetz's development of a pseudonym, "Mary Lee Taylor", who was said to be a "nutritionist and home economist" for Pet Milk. Under this character, Proetz began making bi-weekly radio broadcasts in 1933 offering recipes and cooking tips which incorporated Pet Milk. The show was called "The Mary Lee Taylor Show" and broadcast from the PET Milk test kitchen. By 1943, these segments had been extended to a half hour airing on CBS Radio on Saturdays with the first half being a soap opera called "The Story of the Week" featuring a young married couple, Jim and Sally Carter. The second half would be "Mary Lee Taylor" discussing her recipes and cooking tips while promoting Pet Milk products. In the 1940s, Pet began offering free recipe books by mail for listeners of the show. At its height, the show was aired on 200 radio stations. It continued after Proetz's 1944 death with other actors playing the titular role. The show moved to NBC in 1948 and aired until 1954.

Pet became the first company to add vitamin D to its dairy products via irradiation in 1943 but sales of PET Evaporated Milk peaked in 1950 leading the company to look to diversification. It began expanding its products with a mix of acquisitions and product development. It introduced first of its kind nonfat dry milk made with an improved process. John Latzer died in 1952 succeeded in leadership by his brother Robert Latzer.

=== Diversification ===
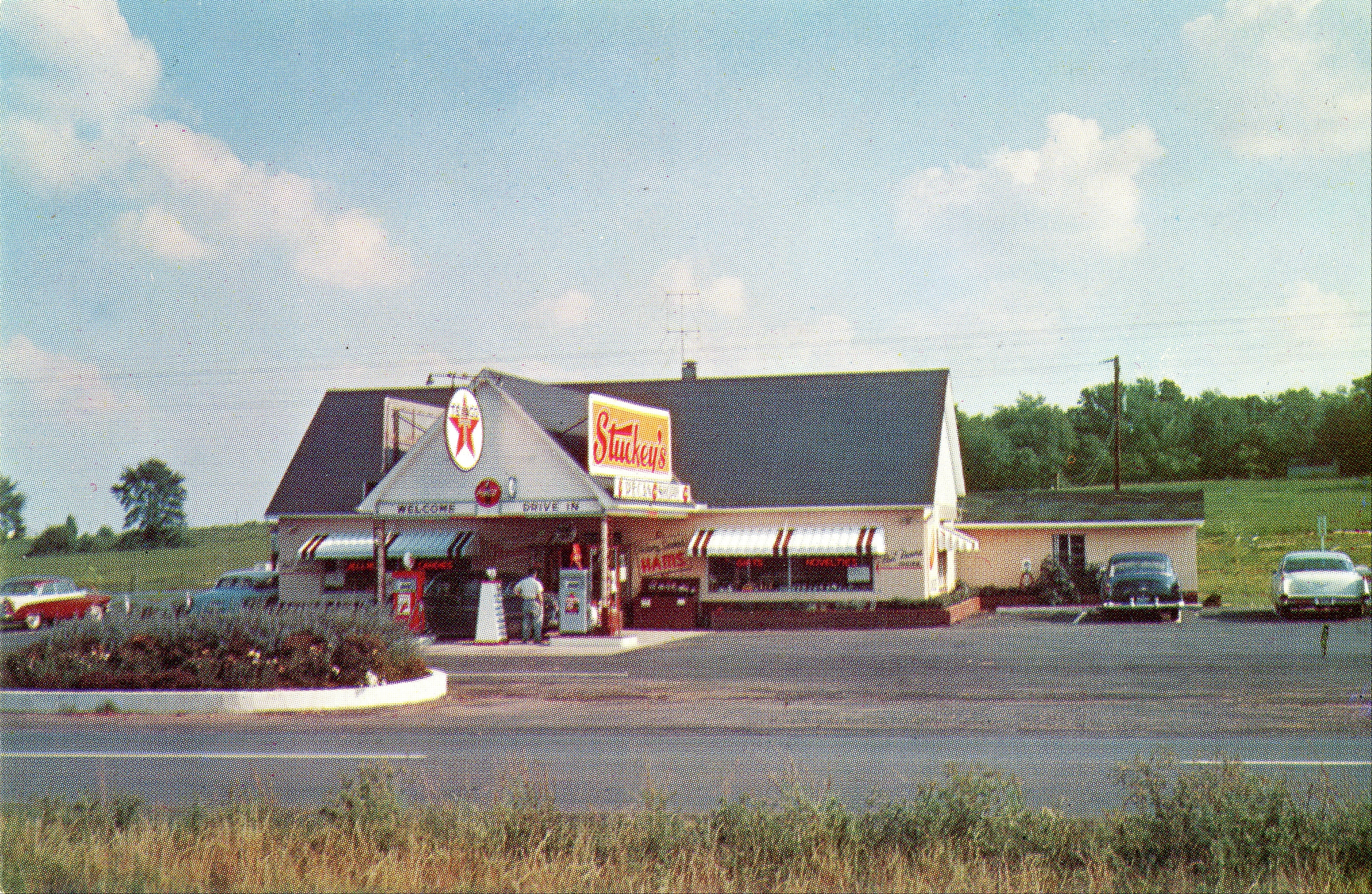
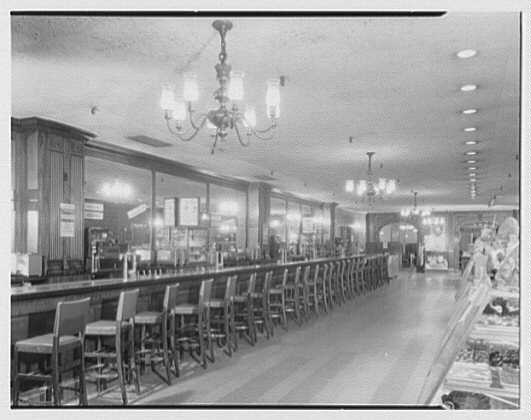
Pet bought Stuckey's roadside stores (top) and Schrafft's restaurants (bottom) in the 1960s

Pet acquired Michigan-based Pet-Ritz Foods Company in 1955, a deal orchestrated by Louis Latzer's grandson Theodore Gamble, and established a Canadian subsidiary. Gamble was elected president in 1959 and Robert Latzer became chairman.

Pet created the Mary Lee Taylor Ice Milk brand in 1959 and in 1960 Pet's Canadian subsidiary acquired Canadian cheese company Old Cherry Hill Cheese House for over US$1 million. Also in 1959, Pet created another frozen pie brand, Swiss Miss. By 1960, it also had significant international operations through the General Milk Co. which was jointly owned by Pet (35%) and Carnation (65%). General Milk itself operated a number of joint ventures including with Standard Brands in Brazil and Beechnut-Life Savers in West Germany.

The company became a food products conglomerate in the early 1960s, purchasing or developing many new brands, as Gamble steered its focus toward the more profitable specialty and snack markets. It bought applesauce producer C. H. Musselman of Biglerville, Pennsylvania in 1961 and the same year introduced Sego Liquid Diet Food. In 1962, Pet announced the closing of its factory in New Glarus but bought Laura Scudder's, a California producer of snack foods, peanut butter, and mayonnaise, from the Signal Oil and Gas Company.

Between 1961 and 1962, Pet also bought Stephen F. Whitman & Son, Inc. chocolates, Downyflake frozen waffles, and pecan producer R. E. Funsten. Its Canadian subsidiary bought Van Kirk Chocolate and Dominion Dairies' Numilk Division. Pet bought Dutch jelly and confectionary producer C. V. Gebroeders Pel in 1963 as Pet sought high-growth markets. The gourmet foods market was Pet's next target with its 1964 acquisitions of Reese Finer Foods, Inc. and fruit-juice producer D. E. Winebrenner Co. Snack foods producer George H. Dentler & Sons and Stuckey's, Inc. were bought in 1965. Stuckey's was Pet's first operation that was not food processing. Stuckey's did produce pecan candy, which fit nicely with Pet's Funsten business, but also owned and operated 27 roadside stores. The company also founded the Matutano company in Barcelona, Spain in 1965 as a joint venture with a local snack foods producer. Pet introduced Skimmed Milk and "99% Fat Free Evaporated Skim Milk" products in 1966. By this point, Pet's sales had increased 123% since 1959 when Gamble became president.

=== Pet Incorporated ===
In 1966, changed its name to Pet Incorporated to reflect its more diverse interests. It then merged with the Hussmann Refrigerator Company and bought a controlling interest in American Refrigeration Products S.A., a Mexican company in the process of expanding to Guatemala which had been partially owned by Hussmann. Continuing with its expansion strategy, Pet bought Aunt Fanny's Bakery in Atlanta in 1966 and in 1967 Schrafft's restaurants for US$14 million.

Mountain Pass Canning Company was Pet's next acquisition, buying the Texas-based company in 1968. With Mountain Pass came its Old El Paso brand of Mexican food. Around this time, Pet sold its portion of General Milk Co., receiving US$30.8 million more than its initial investment of US$875,000. Pet further diversified its product lines in October 1968 buying the 9-0-5 Liquor Store chain of 31 St. Louis-area stores for $6 million.

This period was not without its challenges. While Pet was in the process of moving Hussmann production to a new US$13 million St. Louis site from two old plants, a teamsters strike impacted the division's performance. The strike combined with negative market pressures due to slower housing and supermarket building meant Hussmann's performance was flagging. Additionally, a number of Pet's new products introduced in the previous decades had either failed or were facing competition from newcomers.

These challenges led to several changes to the organization in the late 1960s. Pet replaced the head of its milk division with the head of frozen foods, John Bittner, closing two milk plants, and cutting corporate employees by almost 200. Pet's president and COO Gordon Ellis also resigned and took the president role at Fairmont Foods. At Pet, Boyd F. Schenk became president and CEO after Gamble's death in March 1969.

Schenk had worked for Pet since 1947 starting as a laboratory technician then becoming president of the newly-formed frozen foods division in 1963. By the late 1960s, under Schenk's direction, frozen foods had become the largest of Pet's four divisions. With Schenk at the helm of the entire company, Pet saw record earnings, invested more in advertising than it had been, and continued to create new products, especially those aimed at nice markets. These included frozen Mexican pizzas from the Old El Paso brand, Pet-Ritz pizza crusts, frozen donuts, natural peanut butter, and Sego diet bars. It expanded its liquor store holdings buying Vendome Liquor Markets of Woodland Hills, California in 1970 and sold off two less profitable operations in 1971: Red Seal based in Denver to T&W, Inc. and its Spanish snack foods brand, Matutano, to PepsiCo.

=== ICI ===
After almost tripling its revenue in 12 years to US$1.1 billion in 1977, Pet became the target of an unfriendly takeover bid by IC Industries (ICI) completed in 1978. The deal was complicated by the fact that Pet was in the midst of negotiations to finalize its acquisition of restaurant chain Hardee's which it had agreed to buy for US$95 million in March 1978. Since ICI was not interested in Hardee's, the Pet/ICI merger put an end to that discussion. However, Hardee's accused both Pet and ICI of using the merger as a defensive move to avoid carrying through on Pet's agreement. In the end, ICI paid Hardee's US$1.1 million to settle the issue prior to completing the acquisition of Pet.

ICI, named for the Illinois Central Railroad and led by former Railway Express Agency president William B. Johnson, was a Chicago-based conglomerate. It already owned diverse assets including the Illinois Central Gulf Railroad, the American Brake Shoe Company, real estate in Chicago and New Orleans, Pepsi-Cola General Bottlers, Dad's Root Beer Company, Midas International, and the Gulf, Mobile and Ohio Railroad. It said it had been planning the Pet takeover for two years.

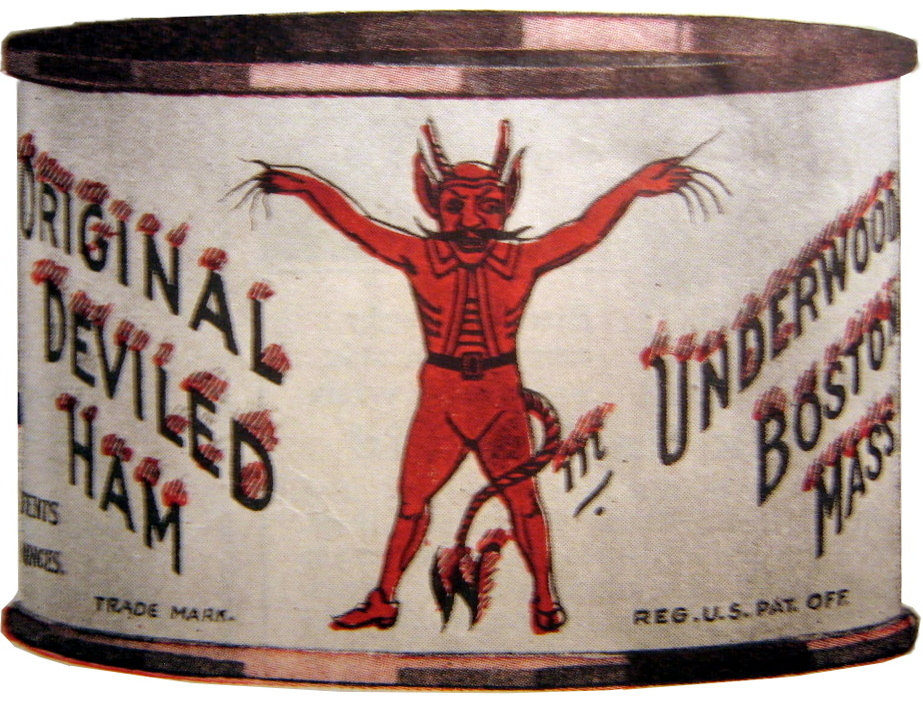
Pet acquired Underwood Deviled Ham in 1982

Within a year of the acquisition, ICI split the businesses of Pet and Hussmann into separate subsidiaries with Hussmann keeping commercial refrigeration, environmental control, and store equipment product lines and Pet holding the food lines. Pet's sold its Musselman division in 1981 to MFP Enterprises of Vincentown, New Jersey for US$35 million and was subsequently bought by Knouse Foods in 1984. In 1982, ICI bought specialty foods producer William Underwood Company for US$150 million merging it into Pet. This brought with it Underwood canned meats, B&M beans, and Ac'cent flavor enhancer. Pet also bought printing company McGrew Color Graphics which it added to its existing St. Louis Lithographing subsidiary. In 1983, Pet left the retail liquor business selling its 52-store 9-0-5 Liquor Stores chain to David C. Kay and a group of investors and the last 24 of its Vendome Liquor Markets stores to Rider Stores of Woodland Hills, California in November. It also sold off its Laura Scudder's business in December 1983.

The head of Pet's grocery group, Ray Morris, took the role of Pet's president in 1984 and Shenk became ICI's president and COO in 1985 but continued to serve as Pet's chairman. Also in 1985, the PET Dairy division was sold to the Challer Foods subsidiary of Finevest Dairy Holdings. This did not include the canned milk products.

By the mid 1980s, Pet had undergone significant restructuring going from 30 operating divisions to 4 groups: Grocery, Specialty, Frozen & Baker, and International. In 1986, Pet acquired Ogden Food Products (including the brands Progresso, Las Palmas, Hollywood, and Hain) for US$320 million and Primo Foods, a Canadian Italian foods marketer. Prepared salad maker Orval Kent Food Company, Inc. was Pet's next acquisition in 1988. Pet then bought Van de Kamp's frozen seafood from Pillsbury in 1989 and specialty meat producer Coorsh and Bittner was acquired by Pet's Canadian subsidiary.

=== Resumed independence ===
Pet's parent company ICI changed its name to Whitman Corp. in 1988 and sold its railroad and defense units to focus on food products. A few years later, in 1991, Whitman spun-off Pet, Inc. to once again operate as an independent company.

By the early 1990s, Pet owned the LaCreme brand of whipped topping and Pet's subsidiary Pet-Ritz also held a regional brand of pie shells, Oronoque. Pet sold the Whitman's chocolate brand in 1993 to Russell Stover Candies. The next year, it sold Orval Kent a group of investors led by former Land O'Lakes executive Dick Fogg.

In 1995, Pet was acquired by the Pillsbury Company, a division of Grand Metropolitan, marking the end of Pet's independent operations.

=== Post independence ===
Over the next decade, Pet's primary brands would be split-up as it and its parent companies underwent a number of transitions. In 1997, Pillsbury's parent Grand Metropolitan merged with Guinness to form Diageo. In 1999, Pillsbury sold the Underwood business, including the B&M, Ac'cent and Sa-son Ac'cent, Las Palmas, and Joan of Arc brands, to B&G Foods. Pillsbury's rationale for the sale was so that it could focus on its larger brands including Green Giant.

A year later, General Mills agreed to acquire Pillsbury, and with it the PET brand and its evaporated milk and dry creamer product lines, from Diageo. However, the Federal Trade Commission (FTC) initially objected to the transaction citing antitrust concerns. To satisfy the FTC, Diageo and General Mills both agreed to sell several Pillsbury and General Mills brands, including PET, to International Multifoods. Both transactions were approved in 2001.

The J.M. Smucker Company acquired Multifoods in 2004 who spun off its US sweetened condensed milk and evaporated milk operations in 2015. The new company, Eagle Family Foods Group, was backed by private investment firm Kelso & Company and based in Akron, Ohio. It took with it a number of Smucker brands including PET.

== PET brand ==
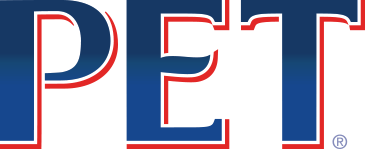
Modern PET logo used by Eagle Foods

The PET brand is used by two companies for their dairy products. The "PET" trademark is owned by Eagle Foods who still produce "PET Milk" brand evaporated milk.

Eagle licenses the "PET" trademark to the DFA cooperative for use in DFA's "PET Dairy" brand. The PET Dairy operations is the successor to the original "Pet Dairy Products Company" founded by the PET Milk Company in 1929. After Pet sold the dairy division to Challer Foods in 1985, it eventually came under the ownership of the Land-O-Sun division of Dean Foods. During Dean's 2020 bankruptcy, the Pet Dairy operation was bought by farmers cooperative DFA who use "PET Dairy" as a regional tradename of fresh and processed dairy products in the Southeastern United States.

== See also ==
=== Former Pet brands ===
- Laura Scudder's snack foods and peanut butter
- Matutano snack foods
- Old El Paso Mexican foods
- Progresso soups
- Schrafft's (restaurant chain)
- Sego (diet drink)
- Stuckey's pecan candies and roadside stores
- Van de Kamp's frozen seafood
- Whitman's chocolates
- William Underwood Company canned meats

=== Related articles ===
- List of defunct consumer brands
- Carnation (brand)
- Milnot
