= Cola =

Carbonated soft drink

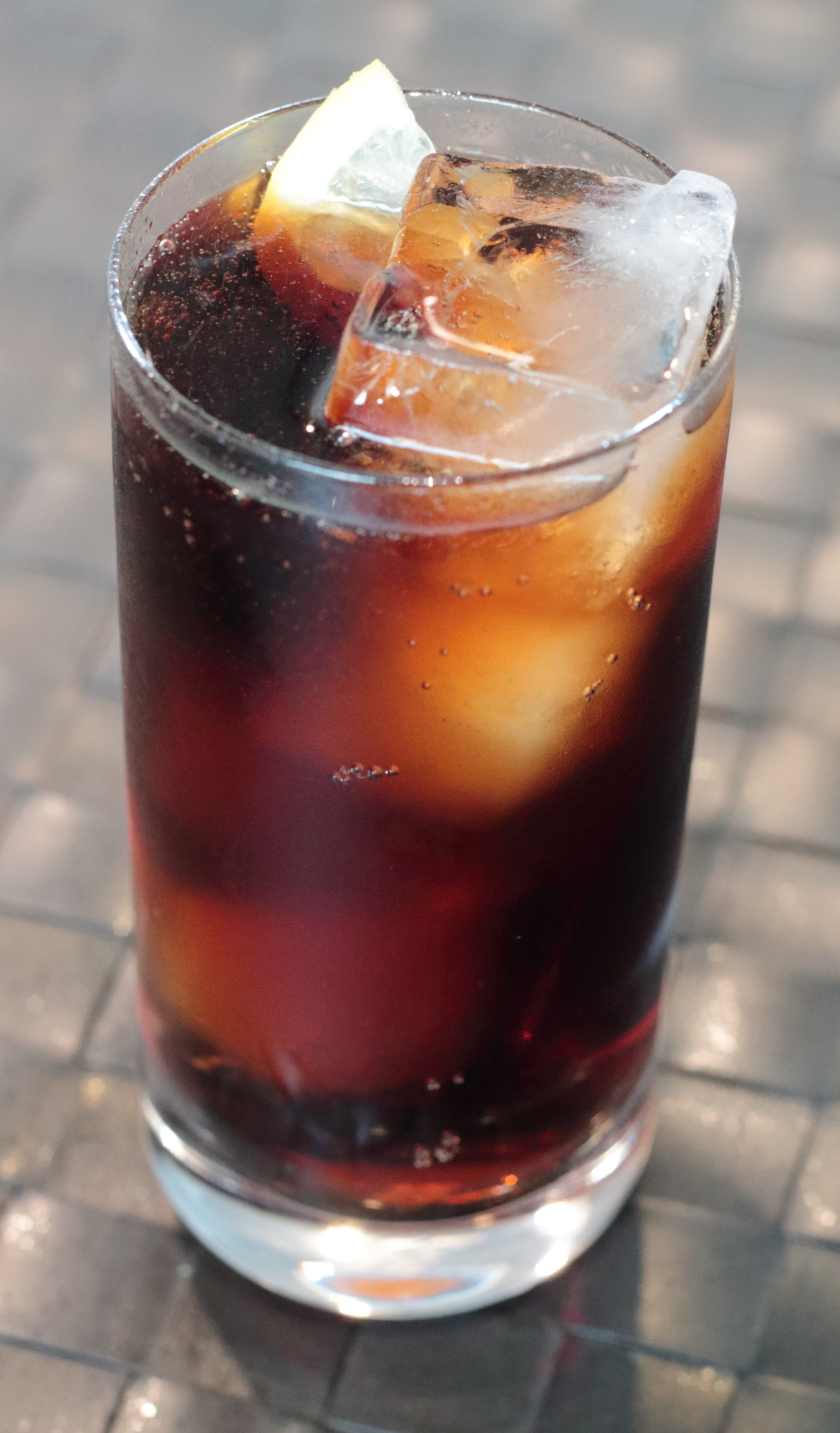
- A glass of cola served with ice cubes
- Type: Soft drink
- Origin: Georgia, U.S.
- Introduced: 1885; 141 years ago
- Color: Caramel (with some exceptions)
- Flavor: Sweet, kola nut, citrus, cinnamon and vanilla

Cola is a carbonated soft drink flavored with vanilla, cinnamon, citrus oils, and other flavorings (typically including sugar or artificial sweeteners). The name, however, comes from the kola nut (Cola acuminata), which imbues the beverage with the stimulant caffeine (though other sources of caffeine are generally used in modern formulations). A stimulating soda using kola appeared circa 1880 in the United States.

Cola became popular worldwide after the success of Coca-Cola, a trademarked brand which has been imitated by other manufacturers. In 1886, American pharmacist John Stith Pemberton finetuned his recipe for a soft drink; it also contained unspent coca leaf extract, and therefore cocaine. His non-alcoholic recipe was directly inspired by the coca wine of pharmacist Angelo Mariani, created in 1863. Local prohibition laws forced him to adapt his recent creation, French Wine Coca.

Most modern colas have a dark caramel color and are normally sweetened with sugar, high-fructose corn syrup or artificial sweeteners. There are numerous different brands, with Coca-Cola and Pepsi being the most popular. These two colas have been competitors since the 1890s, a rivalry that has intensified since the 1980s.

== Flavorings ==
The primary modern flavorings in a cola drink are citrus oils (from orange, lime, and lemon peels), cinnamon, vanilla, and an acidic flavoring. The Coca-Cola syrup was originally manufactured at Joseph J. Jacobs's pharmacy, making it the company's second home. Manufacturers of cola drinks add trace flavorings to create distinctive tastes for each brand. Trace flavorings may include a wide variety of ingredients, such as spices like nutmeg or coriander. Acidity is often provided by phosphoric acid, sometimes accompanied by citric or other isolated acids. Coca-Cola's recipe is maintained as a corporate trade secret.

A variety of different sweeteners may be used in cola, often influenced by local agricultural policy. High-fructose corn syrup (HFCS) is predominantly used in the United States due to the lower cost of government-subsidized corn. In Europe, however, HFCS is subject to production quotas designed to encourage the production of sugar; sugar is thus preferentially used to sweeten sodas. In addition, stevia or an artificial sweetener may be used; "sugar-free" or "diet" colas typically contain artificial sweeteners only.

In Japan, there is a burgeoning craft cola industry, with small-scale local production methods and cola recipes using locally sourced fruits, herbs, and spices.

== Clear cola ==
In the 1940s, Coca-Cola produced White Coke at the request of Marshal of the Soviet Union Georgy Zhukov.

Clear colas were again produced during the clear craze of the early 1990s. Brands included Crystal Pepsi, Tab Clear, and 7 Up Ice Cola. Crystal Pepsi was repeatedly reintroduced in the 2010s.

In Denmark, a popular clear cola was made by the Cooperative FDB in 1976. It was especially known for being the "Hippie Cola" because of the focus on the harmful effects the color additive could have on children and the boycott of multinational brands. It was inspired by a campaign on harmful additives in Denmark by the Environmental-Organization NOAH, an independent Danish division of Friends of the Earth. This was followed up with a variety of sodas without artificial coloring. Today many organic colas are available in Denmark, but, for nostalgic reasons, clear cola has still maintained its popularity to a certain degree.

In June 2018, Coca-Cola introduced Coca-Cola Clear in Japan.

== Health effects ==
A 2007 study claimed that consumption of colas, both those with natural sweetening and those with artificial sweetening, was associated with an increased risk of chronic kidney disease. The phosphoric acid used in colas was thought to be a possible cause. A link has been shown between long-term regular cola intake and osteoporosis in older women (but not men). This was thought to be due to the presence of phosphoric acid, though the risk for women was found to be greater for sugared and caffeinated colas than diet and decaffeinated variants, with a higher intake of cola correlating with lower bone density. Substituting soft drinks for milk may impact adolescent bone development, increasing the risk of fracture.

A 2005 study indicated that soda and sweetened drinks are the main source of calories in the American diet and that of those who drink more sweetened drinks, obesity rates were higher. Most nutritionists advise that Coca-Cola and other soft drinks can be harmful if consumed excessively, particularly to young children whose soft drink consumption competes with, rather than complements, a balanced diet. Studies have shown that regular soft drink users have a lower intake of calcium, magnesium, vitamin C, riboflavin, and vitamin A.

The drink has also aroused criticism for its use of caffeine, which can cause physical dependence (caffeine dependence), and can reduce sleep quality.

Many soft drinks in North America are sweetened mostly or entirely with high-fructose corn syrup (HFCS), rather than white sugar. Some nutritionists caution against the consumption of corn syrup because it may aggravate obesity and type-2 diabetes more than cane sugar. As of 2022, there is no high-quality evidence that replacing cane sugar (sucrose) with HFCS causes any difference in health effects.

== Regional brands ==
=== Asia ===
- Air Koryo Cocoa Honeydew, a 'Coca-Cola-style product' manufactured by the national airline in North Korea.
- Amrat Cola, popular in Pakistan.
- Big/Real/Royal Cola, popular in Indonesia, Thailand, Nigeria and throughout South America.
- Campa Cola, India's most popular brand before the reintroduction of Coca-Cola and Pepsi to the Indian market in 1991.
- Chi Forest (formerly known as Genki Forest) sparkling water cola flavor, a local brand in China.
- Est Cola, a local brand in Thailand.
- Future Cola, a local brand in China.
- KIK Cola, a local brand in Sri Lanka.
- Laoshan Cola, a local brand in China.
- Mecca-Cola, sold in the Middle East, North Africa, as well as parts of Europe.
- Meadows Classic Cola, a DFI brand in Hong Kong, Malaysia, Singapore and Cambodia.
- Mojo, a local brand in Bangladesh.
- MyCola, a local brand in Sri Lanka.
- Pakola, popular in Pakistan.
- Parsi Cola, popular in Iran.
- Red Bull Cola, popular in Thailand.
- Sparkling Super Cola, sold by the A.S. Watson Group (PARKnSHOP, Watsons) of Hong Kong.
- Terelj Cola, sold in Mongolia.
- Thums Up, popular in India.
- Tianfu Cola, a local brand in China.
- Topsia Cola, popular in Iran.
- Vita Cola, produced by Vitasoy of Hong Kong.
- Zamzam Cola, popular in Iran and parts of the Arab world.

=== Europe ===
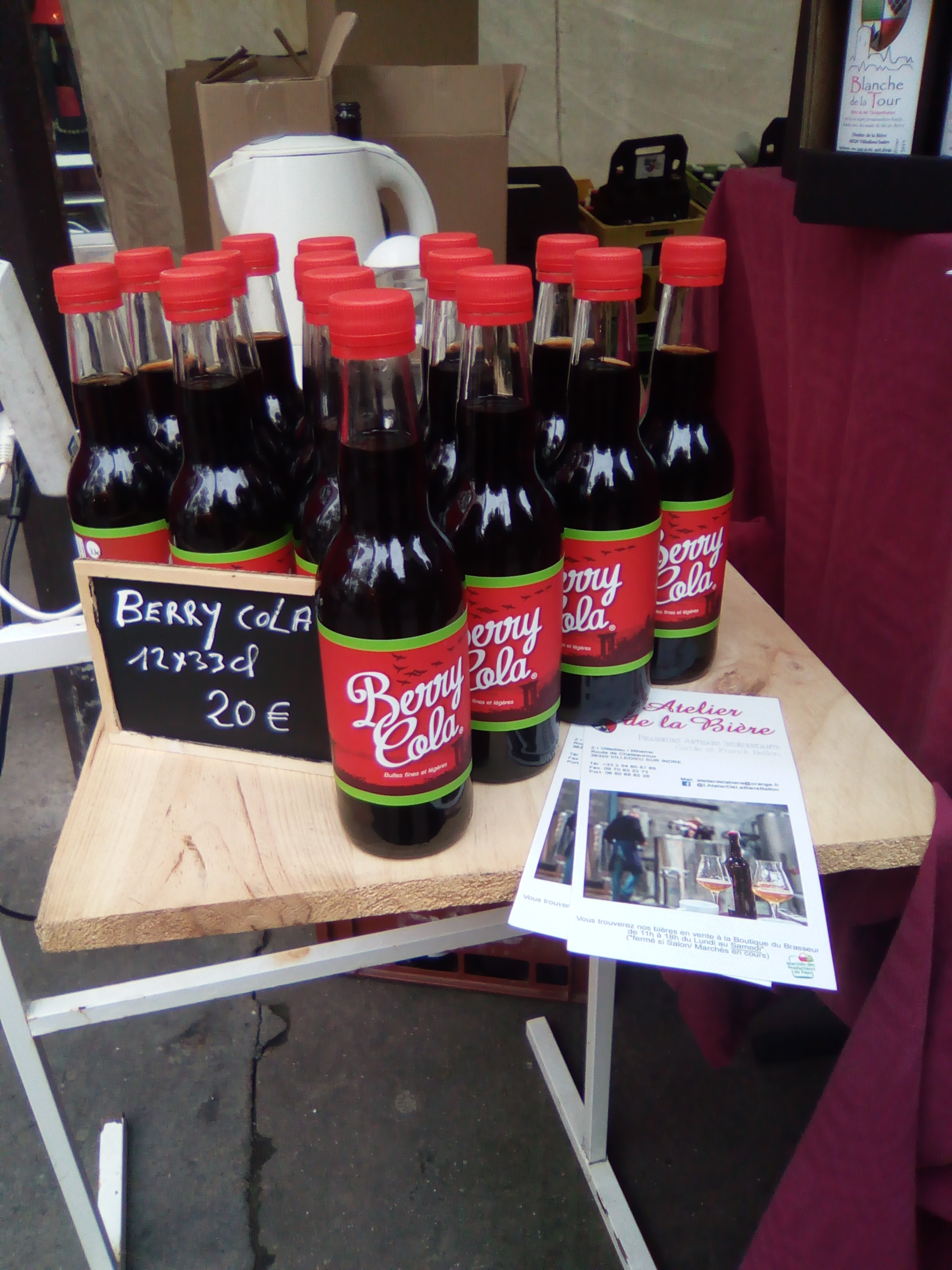
Bottles of Berry Cola, a soft drink produced in Indre, France

- Afri-Cola, a German brand of cola.
- Baikal, a cola brand originally created as a Soviet alternative to Cola. Popular in Russia.
- Barr Cola made by A.G. Barr (the makers of the popular Irn-Bru drink) in the United Kingdom.
- Breizh Cola is a local brand from Brittany (France).
- Brisa Cola is a local brand from Madeira, Portugal and produced by Empresa de Cervejas da Madeira.
- Cola Turka is a local brand in Turkey.
- Cockta is a local brand from former Yugoslavia, which does not contain any caffeine or phosphoric acid.
- Corsica Cola is a regional cola distributed by the Corsican brewery Pietra.
- Cuba Cola is a brand from Sweden.
- Dobry Cola, a Russian brand which replaced Coca-Cola after the departure of global companies from Russia in 2022, produced in the same factories as the original products.
- Evoca Cola is a cola made with mineral water made by Evoca Drinks.
- Fentimans Curiosity Cola, is an upmarket botanically brewed cola produced by Fentimans, from the UK.
- Fritz-Kola, a cola soft drink from Hamburg, Germany, uses the highest possible concentration of caffeine for beverages allowed by German law.
- Green Cola is a brand from Greece that is available also in Germany, Spain, Cyprus, the Baltic states, Romania, the Middle East, Slovenia, etc.
- Hofmuhl Cola is a local brand from Bavaria, made by a regional brewery.
- Jolly Cola, which had a 40% share of the cola drink market in Denmark from the mid-1960s to the late 1980s.
- Kofola is the primary rival to Coca-Cola and Pepsi in the Czech Republic and Slovakia, and does not contain phosphoric acid.
- Kristal Kola is a local brand in Turkey.
- Palestine Cola, a Swedish cola brand created in 2024 as an alternative to Israeli-associated cola brands. Sold in most of Europe.
- Polo-Cockta, a Polish brand.
- Qibla Cola was a British cola brand active from 2003 to 2005.
- Red Bull Simply Cola has been available throughout Europe since 2008.
- Sinalco cola is a German cola brand sold and produced in Europe.
- Sky Cola is a Bosnian cola brand owned by Sarajevski kiseljak.
- Tøyen-Cola is a Norwegian cola brand, based on the open Cube cola recipe.
- Vita-Cola is a German cola brand with a distinct citrus flavor; nowadays it is mostly sold in eastern Germany.

=== North America ===
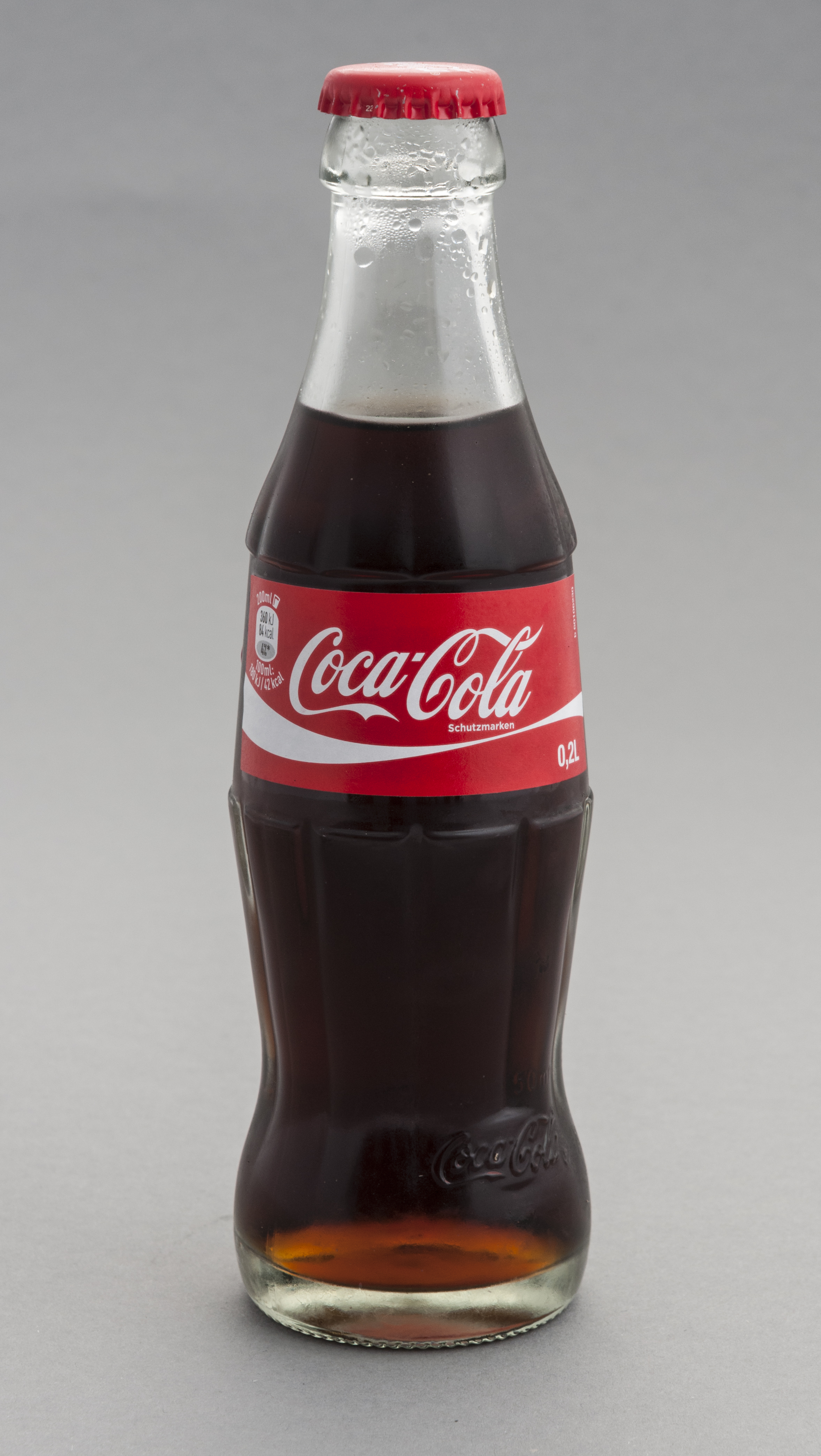
A small glass bottle of Coca-Cola, the first cola

- Coca-Cola, often referred to simply as Coke, is produced and manufactured by The Coca-Cola Company. It is one of the most popular cola brands in North America and worldwide, as well as being the original cola.
- Pepsi, produced and manufactured by PepsiCo, is also one of the most popular cola brands in North America and worldwide. Pepsi is the main competitor and rival of Coca-Cola.
- RC Cola, short for Royal Crown Cola, is now produced by Keurig Dr Pepper.
- Bec Cola is produced in Montreal, Quebec, Canada, sold across Quebec and Ontario. It is sweetened with primarily maple syrup.
- Big 8 Cola is a brand of colas and other flavored sodas that can be found in Atlantic Canada.
- Cott produces many house brand beverages as well as its own line of products, most notably its Black Cherry and Bubba cola.
- The Double Cola Company, Double Cola.
- Faygo Cola is distributed in the Eastern United States and can be found in some regions of Canada.
- Fentimans Curiosity Cola, originating from the United Kingdom in 1905, now sold across Europe and North America
- Jarritos Cola is a brand of cola from Mexico, native to Mexico and widely distributed in the United States.
- Jolt Cola is sold by Wet Planet Beverages of Rochester, New York.
- Jones Soda also makes a cola using cane sugar.
- Polar Beverages of Worcester, MA produces its own brand of cola under the Polar name.
- Red Bull Simply Cola was available in the United States from 2008 to 2011.
- Red Cola, a Mexican soft drink brand produced by Consorcio AGA, which also distributes Jarritos' products in certain regions in Mexico.
- Shasta Cola, produced by Shasta .
- TuKola and Tropicola are brands from Cuba (also sold widely in Italy).
- Zevia Cola is a zero-calorie soft drink sweetened with Stevia.

=== South America ===
- Inca Kola, created by Lindley bottler to compete with Coca-Cola. It is still the best selling cola in Perú.
- Big Cola, a cola produced by Peruvian company Ajegroup which operates in 14 countries in Latin America.
- Perú Cola, created by Peruvian bottler Embotelladora Don Jorge S.A.C. to compete with Coca-Cola and Kola Real.
- Kola Román, a cola that was invented in the city of Cartagena, Colombia in 1865 by Don Carlos Román.
- Dolly Cola, Brazilian soft drink brand known for being a direct competitor to Coca-Cola. Although best known for its guarana flavor, the brand also sells the cola flavor.
- Casa di Conti, in Cândido Mota, SP, Brazil, produces its own brand of cola under the name Conti Cola.
- Cunnington Cola, a popular cola found in most Argentinian supermarkets. It is the third most popular Cola in Argentina, after Coke and Pepsi.

=== Oceania ===
- LA Ice Cola is an Australian cola owned by Tru Blu Beverages, similar to Coca-Cola and Pepsi, its rivals.
- Billson's produces a Heritage Cola, inspired by recipes dating back to the Temperance movement in Australia.
- Foxton Fizz is a New Zealand soft drink company which produces a cola-flavored soft drink beverage, manufactured in Foxton.
- Wests is a New Zealand soft drink company that produces a cola beverage. It is the oldest continuous manufacturer of soft drinks in New Zealand.
- Tahiti Cola is a cola sold in French Polynesia.

== Defunct brands ==
- Export Cola was an Australian carbonated cola drink Manufactured by Cadbury Schweppes (now Cadbury plc) during the 1970s and early 1980s. A series of TV advertisements for the drink featured the Australian cricketer Jeff Thomson. It enjoyed a brief resurgence in popularity when it was re-launched in 1993, but the drink was discontinued in 1999.
- Hansen's Natural Soda, Original Cola, made with cane sugar.
- LOCKWOODS Cola, a British brand introduced in the 1960s produced by Lockwoods Foods Limited at their canning factory site in Long Sutton, England, the drink is not on the market anymore, it was sold nationally and also exported.
- Maxi-Cola was sold by Mac's Brewery in England as a rival to Coke and Pepsi. Production ended in the early 90s.
- Ubuntu Cola was a fair trade cola from the United Kingdom available in parts of Western Europe from 2007 to 2019.
- Virgin Cola was popular in South Africa and Western Europe in the 1990s but has waned in availability.
- XL Cola was a Swedish cola brand introduced in 1985, but the drink is no longer on the market.

== See also ==
- Cola chicken – Hong Kong chicken dish
- Peanuts and Coke – Snack from the Southern United States
- Open-source cola – Cola produced according to a free recipe
- List of brand name soft drinks products
- List of soft drink flavors
- List of soft drink producers
- List of soft drinks by country
- OpenCola (disambiguation)
- Soda geyser – Eruption caused by mixing Diet Coke with Mentos
