= Corsica Cola =

Cola made in France

- Type: Cola
- Manufacturer: Pietra brewery
- Origin: France
- Introduced: May 2003; 23 years ago
- Color: Caramel
- Related products: Coca-Cola
- Website: www.brasseriepietra.com

Corsica Cola is a regional cola distributed by the Corsican brewery Pietra (owner of the brand) but produced in Cholet in western France.

Corsica Cola benefited from an unexpected kick start during its launch in May 2003: a heat wave. The stock was exhausted in two months. On the 31 December 2003 in Corsica alone, the small company sold 1.5 million bottles. According to Armelle Sialelli, director of the Pietra brewery, previously the creator of Corsican chestnut beer, the goal was to have a product that was highly thirst-quenching.
