= OpenCola =

OpenCola, Opencola or open cola may refer to:

- Open-source cola, cola with an openly available recipe.
- Opencola, the free-software P2P company started by Grad Conn, Cory Doctorow, and John Henson.
- OpenCola (drink), a brand of open-source cola produced by the free-software company Opencola.
