= Ubuntu (disambiguation) =

Ubuntu is a computer operating system.

Ubuntu may also refer to:

- Ubuntu (philosophy), an ethical concept of southern African origin
  - Ubuntu theology, a Southern African Christian perception of the philosophy

== Arts and entertainment ==
- Ubuntu (album), by Piso 21, 2018
- Ubuntu (film), a 2017 film in Marathi
- Ubuntu Goode, in 2009 animated sitcom The Goode Family

== Places ==
- Ubuntu (restaurant), Napa Valley, California, U.S. (2007–2012)
- Ubuntu Local Municipality, Northern Cape, South Africa

== Other uses ==
- Ubuntu (typeface), for use with the Ubuntu operating system
  - Ubuntu Titling, an earlier typeface
- Ubuntu Cape Town F.C., a football club
- Ubuntu Cola, a soft drink
- Ubuntu Party, a South African political party

== See also ==
- Ubundu, a city in the Democratic Republic of the Congo
- Ubuntu Edge, a failed 2013 smartphone prototype
