= Free Beer =

Open source beer

- Type: Beer
- Manufacturer: Independent
- Origin: Denmark
- Introduced: 2004
- Related products: OpenCola (drink)
- Website: freebeer.org

Free Beer is a beer brand collaboration between students of IT University of Copenhagen and the artist collective Superflex initiated in 2004. The recipe of the beer is published under a Creative Commons license, granting others the right to freely use and distribute it.

== History ==
=== Vores Øl ===
In December 2004, a group of students from the IT University of Copenhagen, in partnership with Superflex, brewed a batch of beer in the university's cafeteria. The group named the beer "Vores Øl" (Danish for "Our Beer"), inspired by a 1994 Carlsberg beer advertisement slogan. They launched a website to promote the project and released the beer’s recipe and label design under the Creative Commons CC BY-SA 2.5 license. Since cooking recipes are not protected by copyright, the share-alike licensing approach used is legally questionable and had not been tested in any court of law.

=== Free Beer ===
The developers of the beer stated that they wanted to raise awareness of the "dogmatic notions of copyright and intellectual property that are dominating our culture." The group admitted to having limited experience with beer production. After the first batch of the open-source beer was brewed, Superflex continued developing the concept under the name "Free Beer" and designed a new label. Inspired by colourful aesthetics of the 1960s, it was meant to further underline the concept of freedom. The name Free Beer is a play on Richard Stallman's quote about free software being “'free' as in 'free speech,' not as in 'free beer.'”

=== Recipe ===
The first Vores Øl recipe drew criticism from the homebrewing community for its lack of necessary instructions. Community members were concerned the recipe had not outlined how much water to use in the mash, what type of yeast to use, the style of beer being produced (other than being dark and heavy), whether or not to add any hops, what the fermentation temperature should be, or how the beer was supposed to taste.

Due to the free availability of the recipe, the recipe has been changed several times. Major Free Beer recipe iterations (v3.0 and v4.0) were developed in collaboration with a Danish brewery, Skands, in Brøndby. The amount of sugar has been decreased by 90% to improve the quality of the beer.

Version	Codename	Date	Brewery/Comments
	"FREE BEER – Performa Version"	October 31, 2023	Brewed by Evil Twin Brewing for the Performa Biennial in New York.
	"FREE BEER / FREE UKRAINE"	August 9, 2022	Mikkeller and Warpigs in Copenhagen and Berryland Cidery in Ukraine
8.0		May 31, 2022	Brewery 304 in Seoul
6.0	"The Atlantic Brew"	October 30, 2017	Summerskills brewery in Devonport, Plymouth
4.1		August 25, 2010	Brewery in Huntington Beach, California
4.1	"Artspace"	October 2008	Steam Brewing Company in Newton, New Zealand
4.0	"SKANDS"	September 2008	Skands Microbrewery in Brøndby, Denmark
3.5	"Hops & Barley"	March 2008	By the Hops & Barley microbrewery Berlin, Germany
3.4	"Germania"	November 2007	Arnaldo Ribero, Germania brewery in São Paulo, Brazil
3.3	"Linghzi"	November 2007	Everything Mushroom, Knoxville, Tennessee
3.2	"St Austell"	July 2007	St Austell Brewery in Cornwall, England
3.0	"Skands"	June 2006	Skands Microbrewery in Brøndby, Denmark (and more)
2.1	"Apollo"	August 2006	Apollo Microbrewery in Copenhagen
1.5	"Samvirke"		Suited for homebrewing
1.1	FREE BEER	May 20, 2005	First time served under the name Free Beer at the Volksbühne
1.0	"Vores Øl"	December 2004	Brewed by students at the IT university in Copenhagen with Superflex

== Derivatives ==
Known derivatives using the free license include:

- Lausanne, Switzerland: Le Baiser de la Princesse (French for "The Kiss of the Princess"), in 2008.
- Schiltigheim, France: Affichage Libre, brewed for the 2011 edition of the Libre Software Meeting in Strasbourg.

== Reception ==
Free Beer has received coverage in international print and digital media. The brand has been discussed in books on copyright. The project been written about by figures in the free software movement, including Cory Doctorow and Lawrence Lessig. In 2005, Superflex interviewed Richard Stallman on the project.

Free Beer has been distributed at technology conferences, including Summit 2008 and RMLL 2011, 2012, and 2014. The FSCONS 2008 resulted in an ebook that featured Free Beer. Free Beer was also exhibited in art exhibitions and museums, such as the Art Basel Miami Beach 2006, the Van Abbemuseum in the Netherlands in 2007, and the Taipei Biennial 2010.

In 2007, a columnist writing for BeerAdvocate regarded Free Beer's licensing structure as a "great marketing gimmick," even if superfluous, remarking that "recipes are generally not copyrightable to begin with."

== Gallery ==
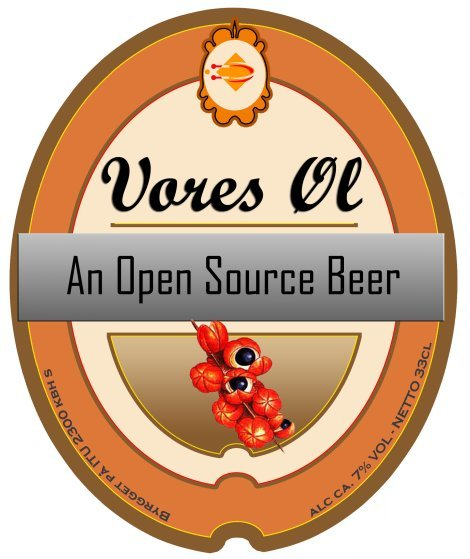
Original Free Beer 1.0 label "Vores Øl" (2004)

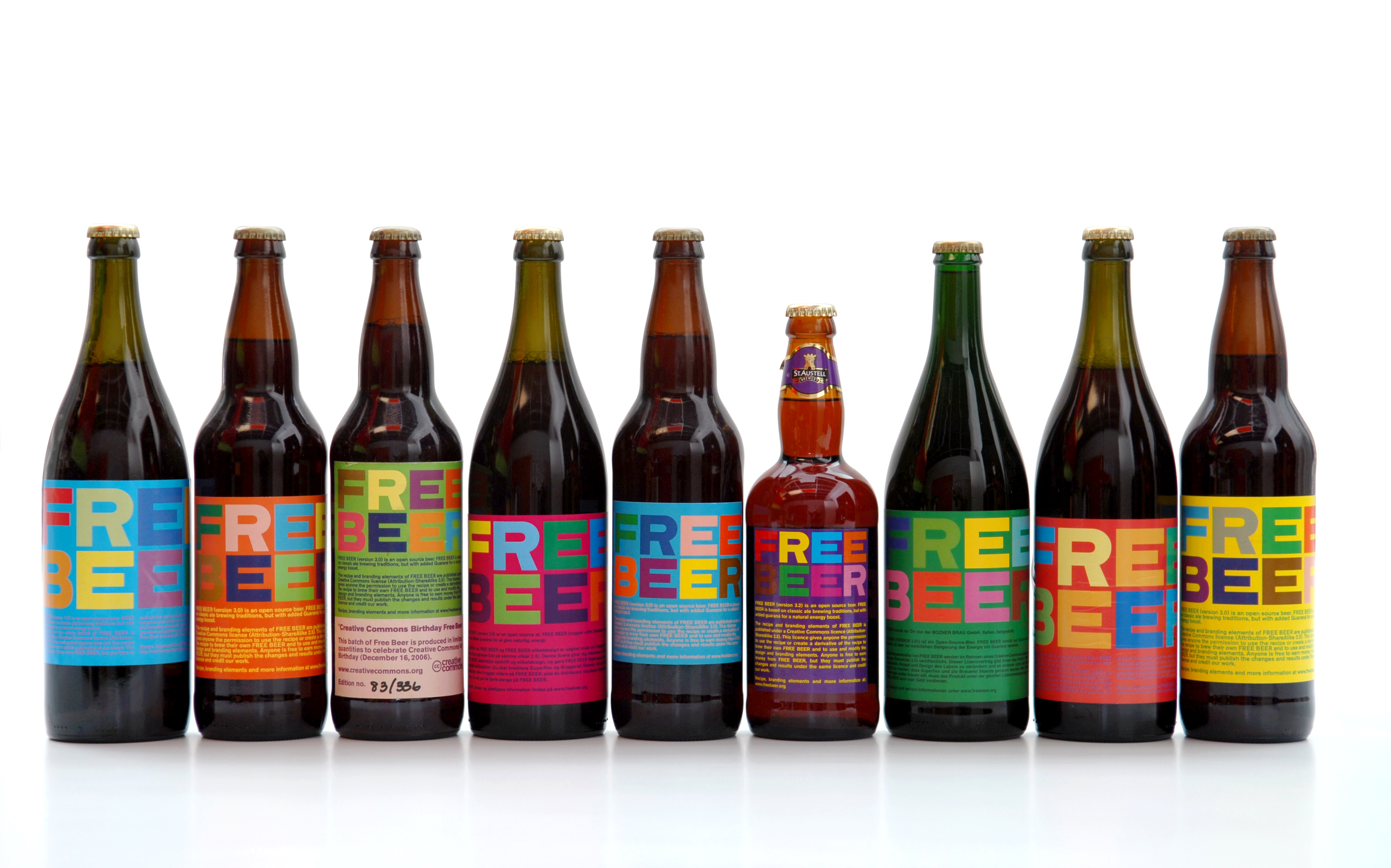
Free Beer bottles based on recipe and label variants created since 2005

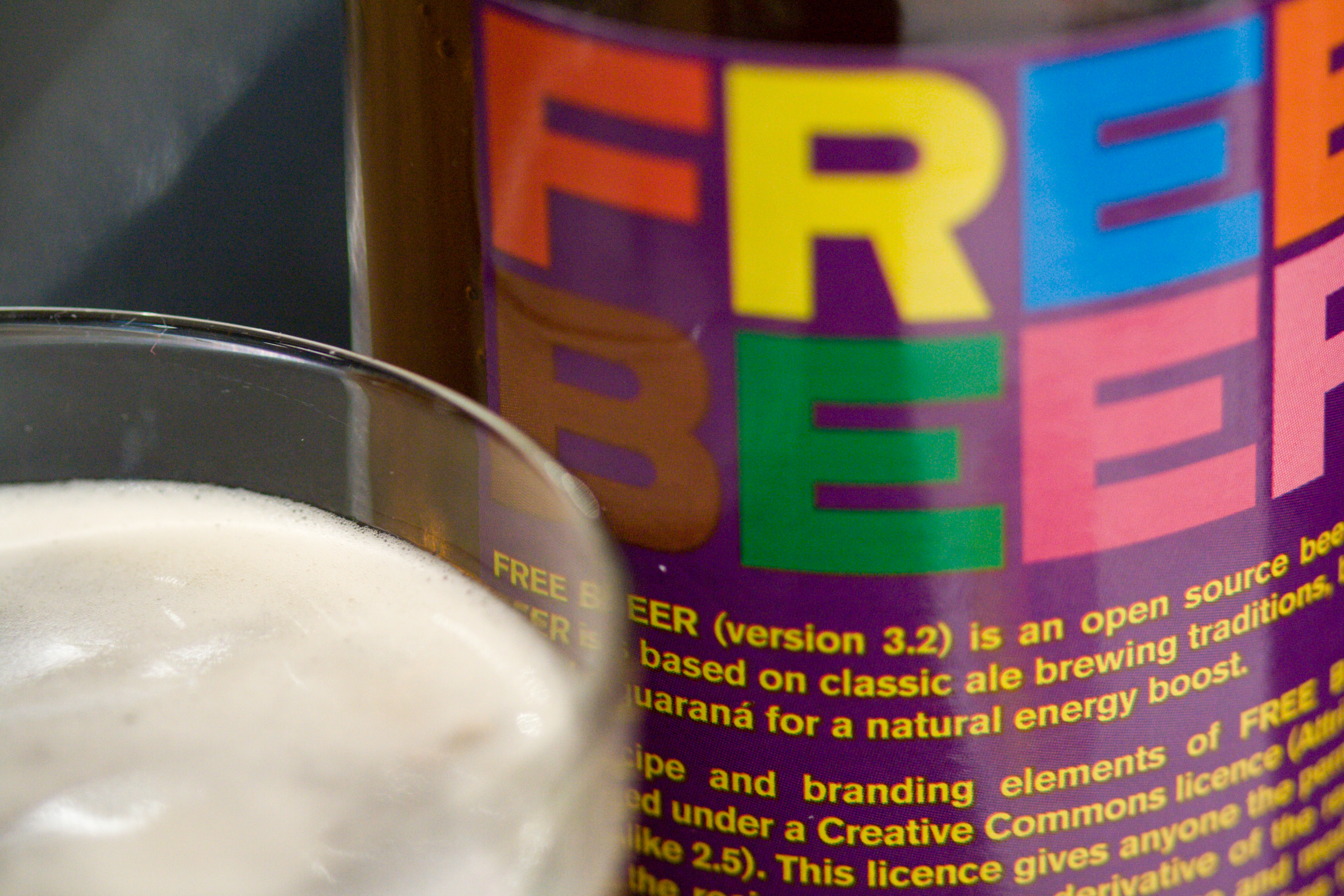
Free Beer "St Austell" (version 3.2) (2007).

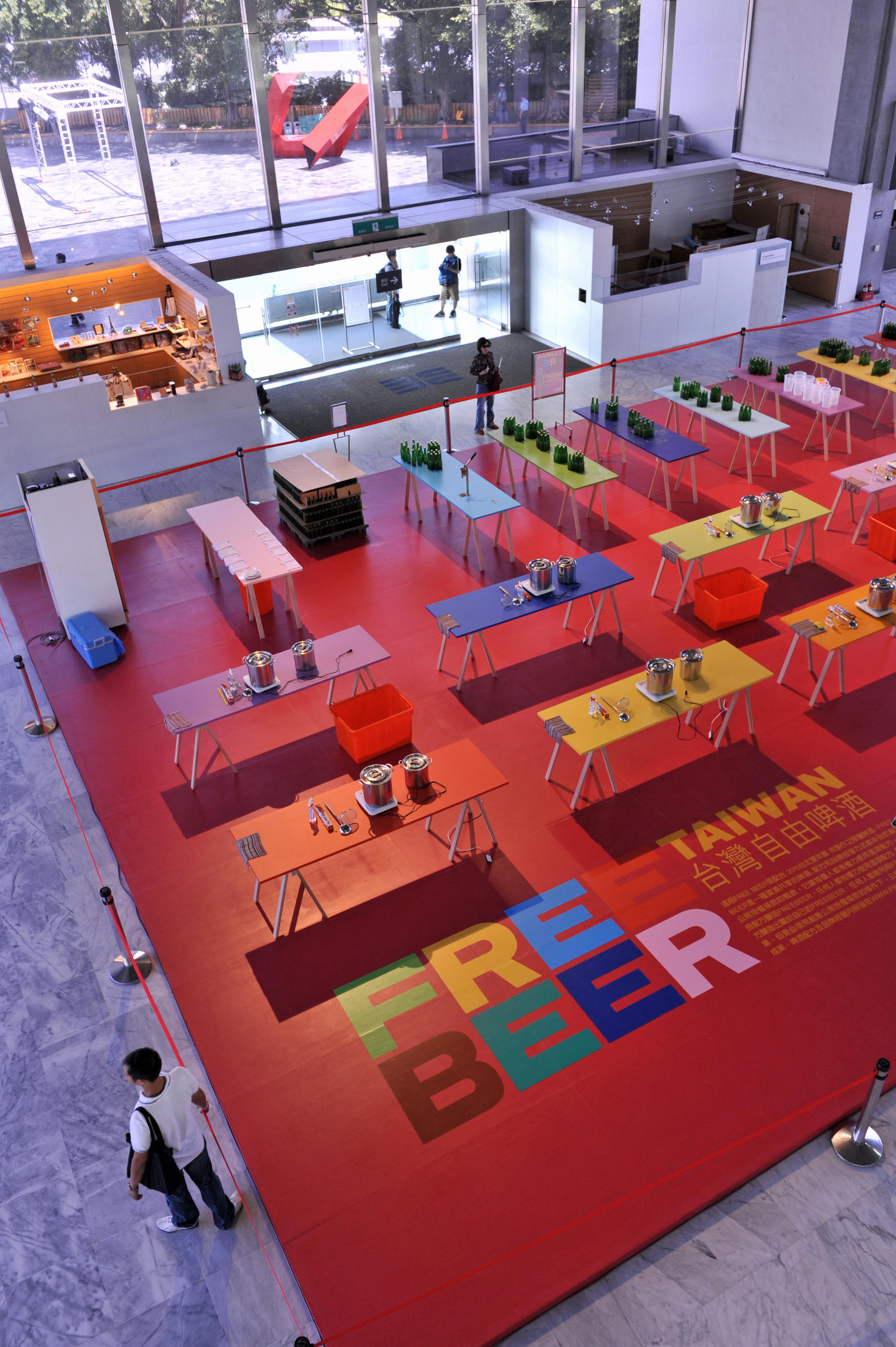
Superflex Workshop at the "Free Beer Factory" event at the Taipei Biennial 2010 in Taipei, Taiwan

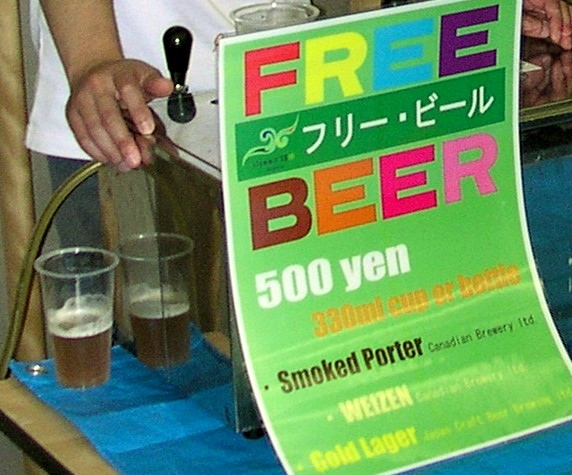
Free Beer on sale at the iSummit 2008 Sapporo in Japan sold for 500yen.

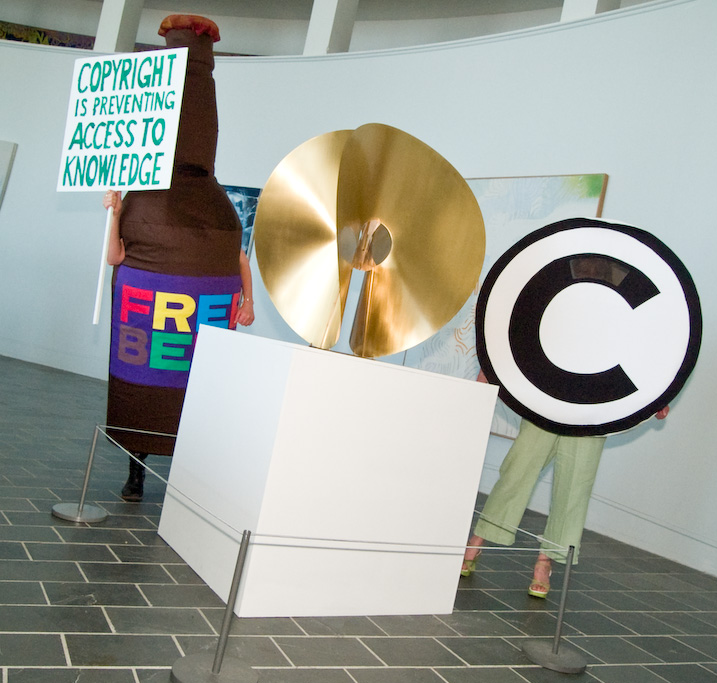
Anti-copyright display with a "Free Beer version 3.2 St. Austell" mascot and a sign reading "Copyright is preventing access to knowledge" (2007)

== See also ==
- OpenCola (drink)
- Moonshine
- Open-source software
- Copyright
