= Neroli =

Essential oil of the bitter orange blossom

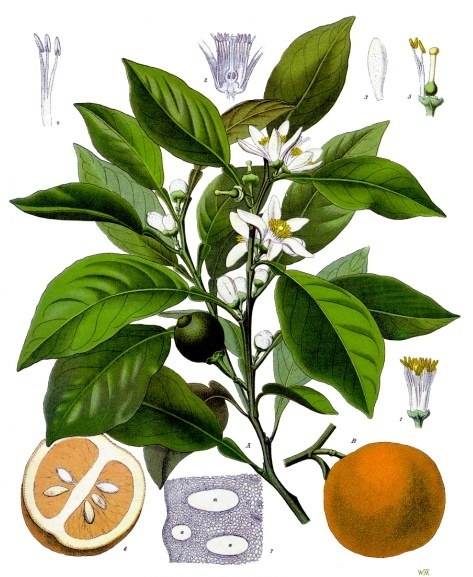
Bitter orange foliage, blossoms and fruit

Neroli oil is an essential oil produced from the blossom of the bitter orange tree (Citrus aurantium subsp. amara or Bigaradia). Its scent is sweet, honeyed, and somewhat metallic with green and spicy facets. Orange blossom water is also extracted from the same blossom and both extracts are extensively used in perfumery. Orange blossom can be described as smelling sweeter, warmer, and more floral than neroli. The difference between neroli and orange blossom is a result of the different extraction processes used to obtain the oil from the blooms. Neroli is extracted by steam distillation, whereas orange blossom is extracted through either enfleurage or solvent extraction.

== Production ==
The blossoms are gathered, usually by hand, in late April to early May. The oil is extracted by steam distillation. Tunisia, Morocco, and Egypt are the leading producers of neroli.

== History ==
By the end of the 17th century, Anne Marie Orsini, duchess of Bracciano and princess of Nerola, Italy, introduced the essence of bitter orange tree as a fashionable fragrance by using it to perfume her gloves and her bath. Since then, the term "neroli" has been used to describe this essence. Neroli has a refreshing and distinctive spicy aroma with sweet and flowery notes.

== Use ==
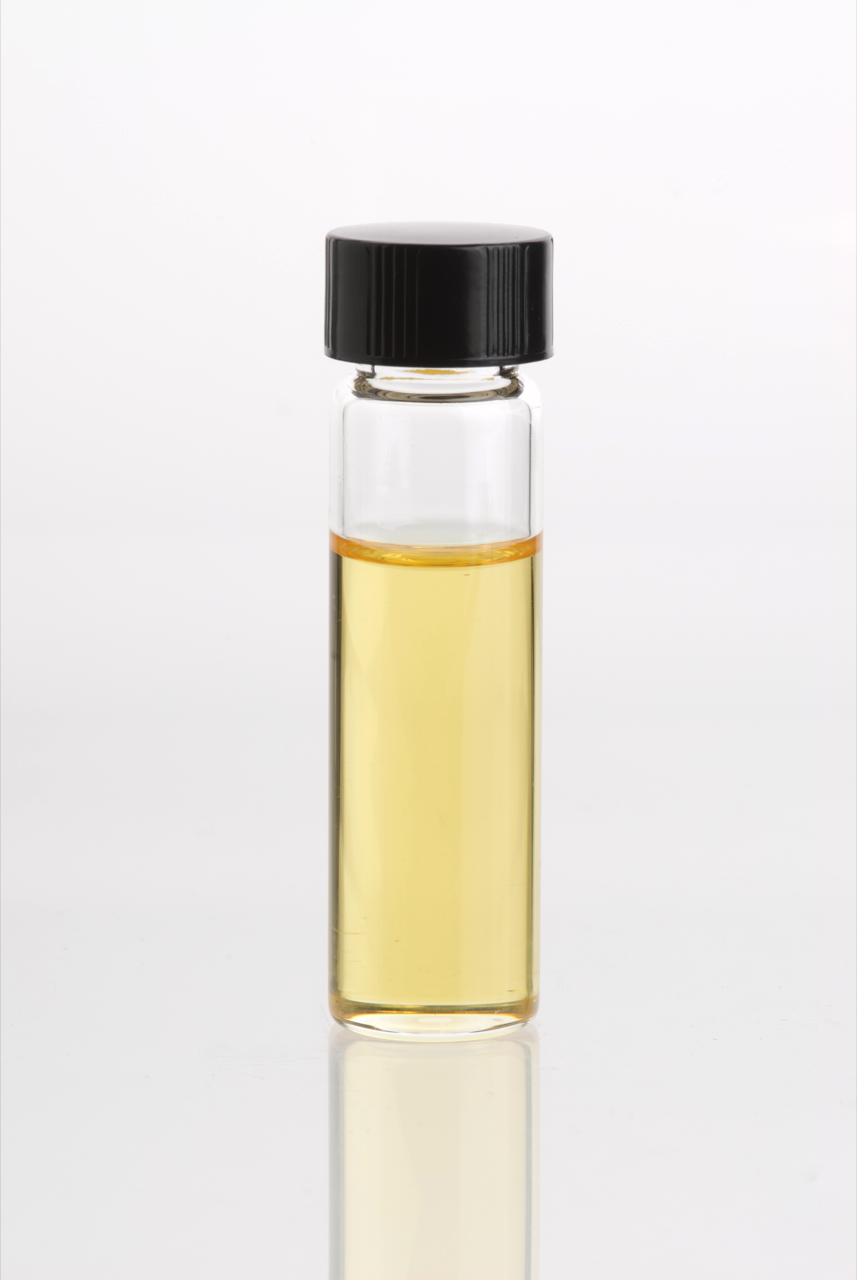
Neroli (Citrus aurantium) essential oil in a clear glass vial

Neroli is one of the most widely used floral oils in perfumery. Like many raw materials, neroli can cause sensitisation due to a high content of aromatic terpenes; e.g., linalool, limonene, farnesol, geraniol, and citral. It blends well with any citrus oil, various floral absolutes, and most synthetic components available on the market.

It also has a limited use in flavorings. Neroli oil is reportedly one of the ingredients in the closely guarded secret recipe for the Coca-Cola soft drink. It is a flavoring ingredient of open source cola recipes, although some variants consider it as optional, owing to the high cost.

== See also ==
- Citrus × aurantium
- Nerol
- Orange flower water
- Orange oil
- Petitgrain oil
