= United States v. Forty Barrels and Twenty Kegs of Coca-Cola =

Federal suit

United States v. Forty Barrels and Twenty Kegs of Coca Cola
- Supreme Court of the United States

Argued February 29, 1916 Decided May 22, 1916
- Full case name: UNITED STATES, Plff. in Err., v. FORTY BARRELS and Twenty Kegs of Coca Cola, the Coca-Cola Company of Atlanta, Georgia, Complainant. No. 562.
- Citations: 241 U.S. 265 (more) 36 S. Ct. 573; 60 L. Ed. 995

Holding
- An ingredient may be considered "added" regardless of whether a product's formula called for it; whether a specific ingredient is harmful is a jury matter; compounded names (such as Coca-Cola) are only distinctive to the product and not the named ingredients should the name achieve a 'secondary significance' of the product itself.

Court membership
- Chief Justice Edward D. White Associate Justices Joseph McKenna · Oliver W. Holmes Jr. William R. Day · Charles E. Hughes; Willis Van Devanter · Mahlon Pitney; James C. McReynolds

Case opinion
- Majority: Hughes, joined by White, McKenna, Holmes, Day, Van Devanter, Pitney
- McReynolds took no part in the consideration or decision of the case.

United States v. Forty Barrels and Twenty Kegs of Coca-Cola, 241 U.S. 265 (1916), was a federal suit under which the government unsuccessfully attempted to force the Coca-Cola Company to remove caffeine from its product.

== Context ==
In 1906, Harvey Washington Wiley was the head of the United States Department of Agriculture Bureau of Chemistry when Congress passed the Pure Food and Drug Act. The Bureau started prosecuting companies which were selling products with harmful components and companies which were making misleading claims about their products. In 1903, Coca-Cola had already stopped using cocaine, transitioning to coca leaves devoid of traces of cocaine and had dropped the claim that it cured headaches. But to compensate, the company had increased the amount of caffeine, and Wiley believed that even small amounts of caffeine in beverages was harmful to people. He was particularly worried that Coca-Cola was being consumed by children as young as 4 years old. So, in 1909, he ordered the seizure of 40 barrels and 20 kegs of a Coca-Cola shipment.

== Claim ==
On March 13, 1911, the government initiated the case under the 1906 Pure Food and Drug Act. It tried to force the Coca-Cola Company to remove caffeine from the Coca-Cola formula, believing that the product was adulterated and misbranded.

- "Adulterated": The allegation of adulteration was, in substance, that the product contained an added poisonous or added deleterious ingredient (namely, caffeine) which might render the product injurious to health. The government stated that the syrup, when diluted as directed, would result in a beverage containing 1.21 grains (or 78.4 mg) of caffeine per 8 oz serving.
- "Misbranded": It was alleged to be misbranded in that the name "Coca Cola" was a representation of the presence of coca and cola but that the product "contained no coca and little if any cola" and thus was an "imitation" of these substances and was offered for sale under their "distinctive name". At that time, the labels had images of coca leaves and kola nuts.

== Title ==
The case title—naming an object, "Forty Barrels and Twenty Kegs of Coca-Cola", as defendant—is an instance of jurisdiction in rem (jurisdiction against a thing). Rather than directly naming the Coca-Cola Company as defendant, the food itself was the subject of the case, with the company only indirectly subject. The barrels and kegs had been seized in 1909 by the government.

== Decision ==
- "Adulterated": The decision, delivered by Justice Hughes, states that the intent of the word "added" in the context of the Act did not exclude the ingredients of a formula "sold under some fanciful name which would be distinctive" if any were found deleterious and was included to protect natural foodstuffs from prosecution because of constituent poisons rendered inert in their natural state (such as fusel oil in liquor); furthermore, it states that the introduction of caffeine in the later stages of syrup production made it an "added ingredient" in any sense of the term and the removal of harmful ingredients, even if vital to the identity of the product, did not constitute adulteration.
- "Misbranded": Of the misbranding charge, the Court held neither had the government proved that "coca cola" was a descriptive name nor had the Coca-Cola Company proved it was not, making both of these assertions irrelevant. Thus the Court found that the issue of whether the product contained any coca or cola had not been settled.
- "Details": The case was returned to the lower court for retrial to determine the remaining, factual matters; Justice McReynolds abstained.

== Effect ==
The government made a first appeal in 1913 to the Sixth Circuit Court in Cincinnati, but the ruling was reaffirmed. Worried that this ruling would debilitate the Pure Food and Drug Act, it appealed again in 1916 to the Supreme Court. This time it won, as the Supreme Court, in an opinion by Justice Charles Evans Hughes, ruled among other things that the original case had evidence both for and against caffeine being toxic, and that it should not have been dismissed by the judge before reaching the jury, and sent the case back to a lower court.

Coca-Cola then voluntarily reduced the amount of caffeine in its product, and offered to pay all legal costs to settle and avoid further litigation. The settlement was accepted because Wiley had already resigned in 1912, and no one at the FDA was interested in continuing the pressure against Coca-Cola.

== See also ==
- List of United States Supreme Court cases, volume 241
- In rem jurisdiction
