= Mecca-Cola =

Cola-flavoured carbonated beverage

- Type: Cola
- Manufacturer: Mecca Cola World Company
- Origin: France
- Introduced: November 2002; 23 years ago
- Related products: Coca-Cola, Zamzam Cola, Qibla Cola
- Website: https://meccacolagroup.com/

Mecca-Cola is a cola-flavoured carbonated beverage. The flagship product of the Mecca Cola World Company, it is marketed as an alternative to U.S. brands such as Coca-Cola and Pepsi-Cola to "pro-Muslim" consumers. The product's name contains the traditional Latin-alphabet transliteration of مكة, "Mecca" in Saudi Arabia.

== Details ==
Mecca-Cola was launched in France, in November 2002, by the brand's founder Tawfik Mathlouthi as a means of aiding Palestinians by tapping into demand for alternative products in European countries. He had been inspired by a popular Iranian soft drink, Zamzam Cola, and only decided to launch his own brand when he was unable to agree on terms for a distribution contract with Zamzam, as well as providing an alternative for his sons instead of Coca-Cola.

Mecca-Cola is now sold in some parts of the Arab world as well as in certain regions of Europe. It has also been bought and consumed in certain parts of the United States, Britain, India and Canada. Although the product was created in France, the company is currently based in Dubai in the United Arab Emirates. Part of its corporate philosophy is, according to the Muslim charity precept, to support charities, and in particular to help the Palestinian people. It pledges to donate 10% of its profits to fund strictly humanitarian projects (such as schools) in the Palestinian territories, and another 10% to charities in the countries in which the drink is sold. This activist stance is reflected in the company slogan, which appears on all its products: "Shake your Conscience." The company also suggests that people avoid mixing the drink with alcohol. Mecca is the Islamic holy city, giving the name of the cola a religious connotation.

In addition to several different presentations of its cola, the company also sells a range of fruit-flavoured soft drinks under the Mecca-Cola name. The company was the sponsor of – and Mecca-Cola the official drink of – the October 2003 Summit of the Organisation of the Islamic Conference (OIC), held in Malaysia.

In a BBC documentary produced in 2003, Qibla Cola's Zafer Iqbal and Mecca Cola's Mathlouthi are shown promoting their "Message in a Bottle".

In 2012 the Federal Supreme Court of the United Arab Emirates decided that "Mecca-Cola" could not be registered as a trademark, due to a law disallowing religious connotations in trademarks.

In 2015, Mecca Cola dissolved operations in many countries including India and the UK.

== International distribution ==
By 2008 Mecca Cola was distributed in 64 countries across the world. Distribution in each country started on a unique date. A partial list of countries where it is distributed is as follows:

Country	Date launched	Notes
France	November 2002	The company originally started in France before moving to Dubai. It is also the company's top market. However, it only holds 1.7% of the market share.
Pakistan	November 2003	In the company's top 5 markets
Malaysia	October 2003	In the company's top 5 markets
Yemen	June 2003	In the company's top 5 markets, holding 22% of market shares
Algeria	August 2003	In the company's top 5 markets, holding 19% of market shares
Saudi Arabia	February 2003	All products are distributed through an $80 million plant set up here
UAE	April 2003	The company is currently headquartered here.
Oman	2003	
Qatar	2003	
Kuwait	2003	
Iraq	April 2003	
Lebanon	February 2003	
Jordan	2003	
Syria	2003	
India	March 2004	Launched first in Jammu and Kashmir, then in Gujarat.
Bangladesh	May 2005	
