= Laoshan Cola =

Chinese soft drink brand

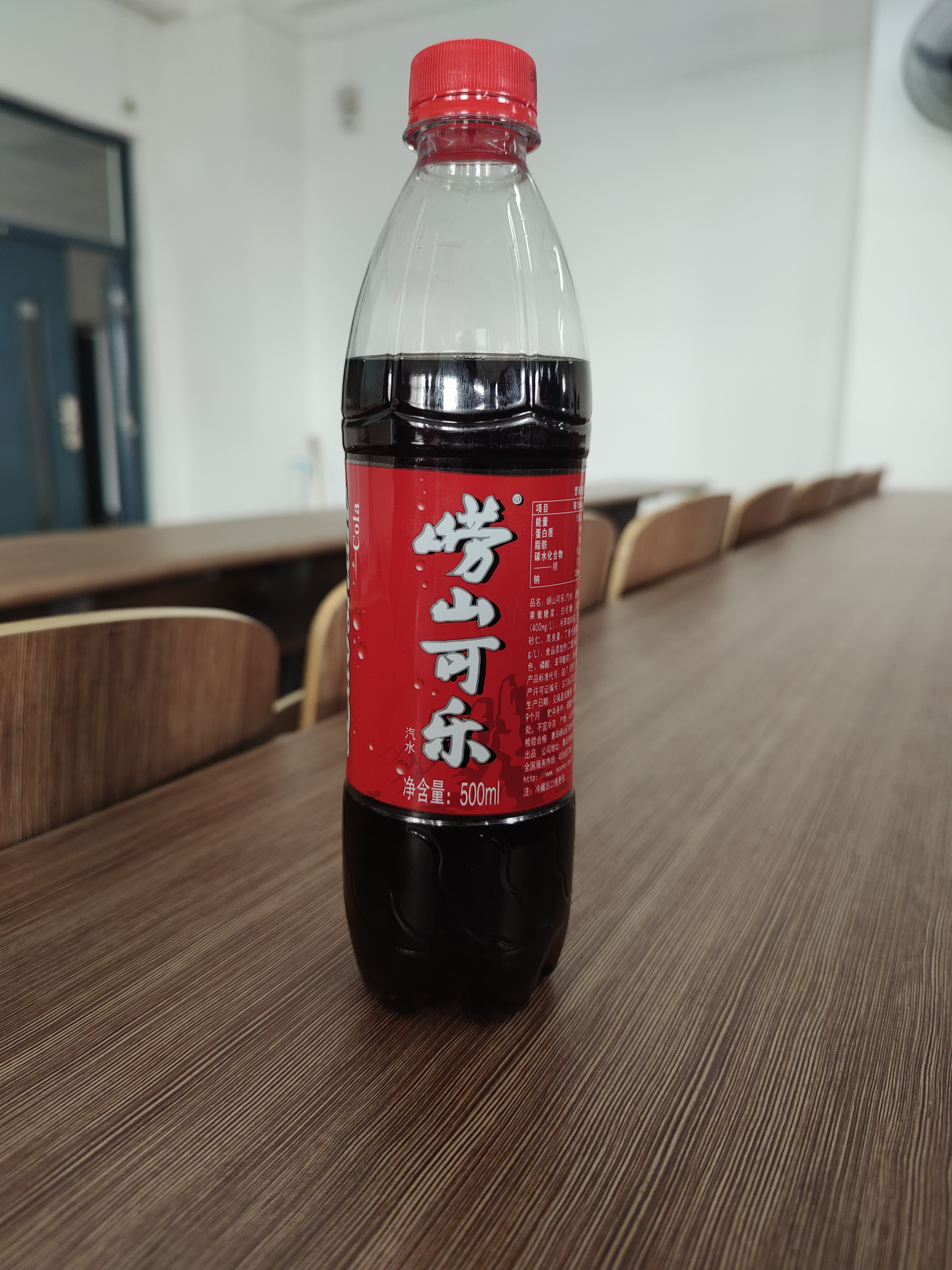
- Type: Soft drink
- Manufacturer: Qingdao Laoshan Mineral Water Company
- Origin: China
- Introduced: 1953
- Flavour: Cola

Laoshan Cola (Chinese: 崂山可乐) is a brand of cola soft drink produced by Qingdao Beverages Group Co., Ltd. First introduced in 1953, it was the most popular of China's eight major cola brands until it was purchased by the Coca-Cola Company in the 1990s. In 1997, Coca-Cola discontinued the production of Laoshan Cola.

Qingdao Laoshan Mineral Water Company purchased the brand in March 2004 and invested in imported machinery to resume production. Laoshan Cola was re-introduced in 2008; faced with competition from Coca-Cola and Pepsi, however, the brand never regained its former market share.
