= Qibla Cola =

Cola-flavored carbonated beverage

Qibla-Cola
- Type: Cola
- Manufacturer: Qibla Cola Company
- Origin: United Kingdom
- Introduced: February 2003; 23 years ago
- Discontinued: September 2005; 20 years ago (UK)
- Related products: Coca-Cola, Zamzam Cola, Mecca Cola
- Website: www.qibla-cola.com

Qibla Cola was a cola-flavored carbonated beverage produced by the Qibla Cola Company, based in Derby, England. The company differentiated itself and its products from its rivals by making an ethical stance in all its operations including giving 10% of its profits to worthy charitable causes. The company expanded distribution into North America, Netherlands, Pakistan and Malaysia before the UK company went into receivership in September 2005.

== Founders ==
The two founders of the company were cousins, Zahida Parveen and Zafer Iqbal from Derby. Zahida Parveen had been involved in a number of charitable projects and decided to initiate this company with a social aim of giving 10% of all profits to charity. Abid Hussain was a public face and an investor in the company.

== Launch ==
Qibla Cola was launched onto the UK market in February 2003, with a nationwide distribution established within months. Strong media interest resulted in reports appearing in the global media and distribution and investment offers coming worldwide.

The company made agreements with distributors in other countries in Europe, North America and Asia, including Canada, Netherlands, Pakistan, Bangladesh, Turkey and Malaysia.

== Philosophy ==
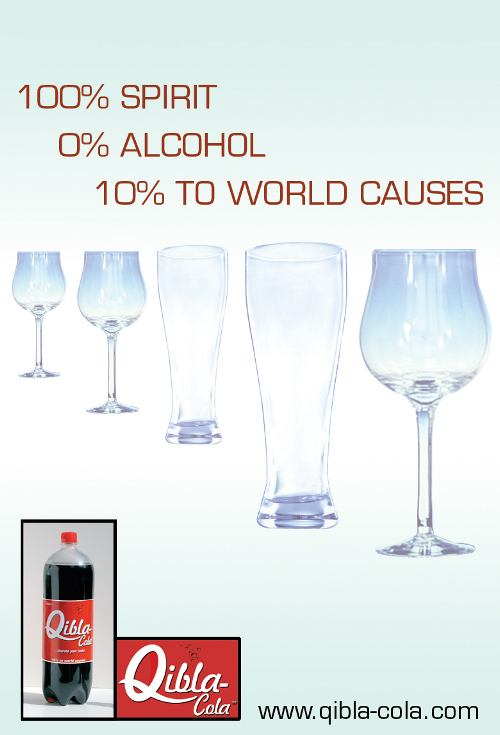
An advertising poster for Qibla Cola.

Qibla Cola's marketing strategy and corporate vision reflected an attempt to tap into a desire for responsible consumption. They claimed to offer a genuine alternative for those cola-drinkers who are wary about the practices and ethics of the major multinational soft-drink companies. Qibla's ethical stance manifested itself in the company's pledge to donate 10% of its net profits to humanitarian causes around the world.

The company said that its name, qibla was used in its primary linguistic sense, to mean "direction". Qibla Cola was thus aimed at consumers of all faiths and ethnic backgrounds, although the company noted that they have had more success on Muslim markets and that all their products are halal.

The word qibla is also a reference to the word Qibla used by Muslims to indicate the direction of the Masjid al Haram in the holy city of Makkah, towards which all Muslims turn when praying.

Additionally it has been suggested Qibla is a play in the surname of one of the founders as it is an anagram of Iqbal.

In addition to its two cola varieties, the company produced and sold the following products:

- Qibla Mango
- Qibla Guava
- Qibla Fantasy (orange flavour)
- Qibla 5 (lemon-lime)
- Qibla Water (premium spring water)

Qibla's chief competitors included Mecca-Cola, Iran's Zamzam Cola, in addition to the US-originating products of the Coca-Cola and Pepsi Cola families.

In a blind taste test conducted by The Guardian UK, Qibla was pitted against Pepsi, Coke and Sainsbury's Classic Cola. Most tasters could not differentiate between any of the colas.

== Progress ==
Operations in Turkey, Malaysia, Pakistan and Bangladesh are ongoing as independent entities.

The UK arm of the company was put into administration in September 2005 following claims by the owners of anti-competitive practices of competitors.
