= Coca-Cola formula =

Coca-Cola Company's recipe for Coca-Cola syrup

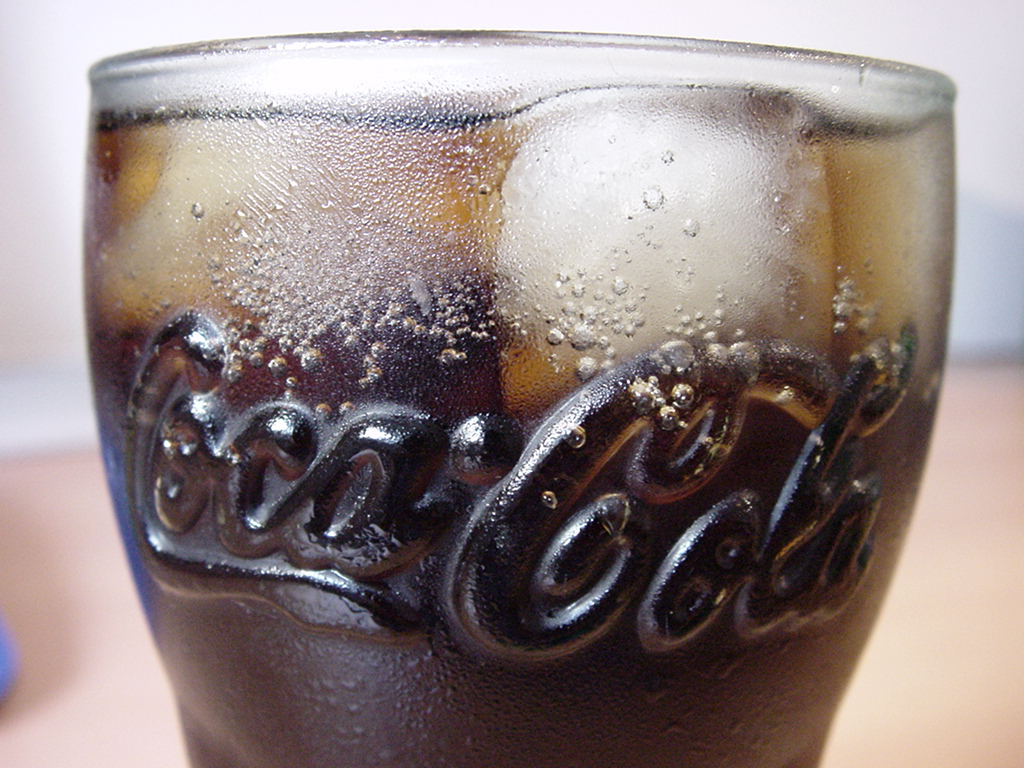
The recipe for Coca-Cola remains a closely guarded trade secret.

The formula for Coca-Cola syrup, which bottlers combine with carbonated water to create the soft drink, is a trade secret that belongs to the Coca-Cola Company. Company founder Asa Candler initiated the secrecy that surrounds the formula in 1891 as a publicity, marketing, and intellectual property protection strategy. Several recipes, each purporting to be the authentic formula, have been published, but the company maintains that the actual formula remains a secret known only to two employees, who each know a different part.

== History ==
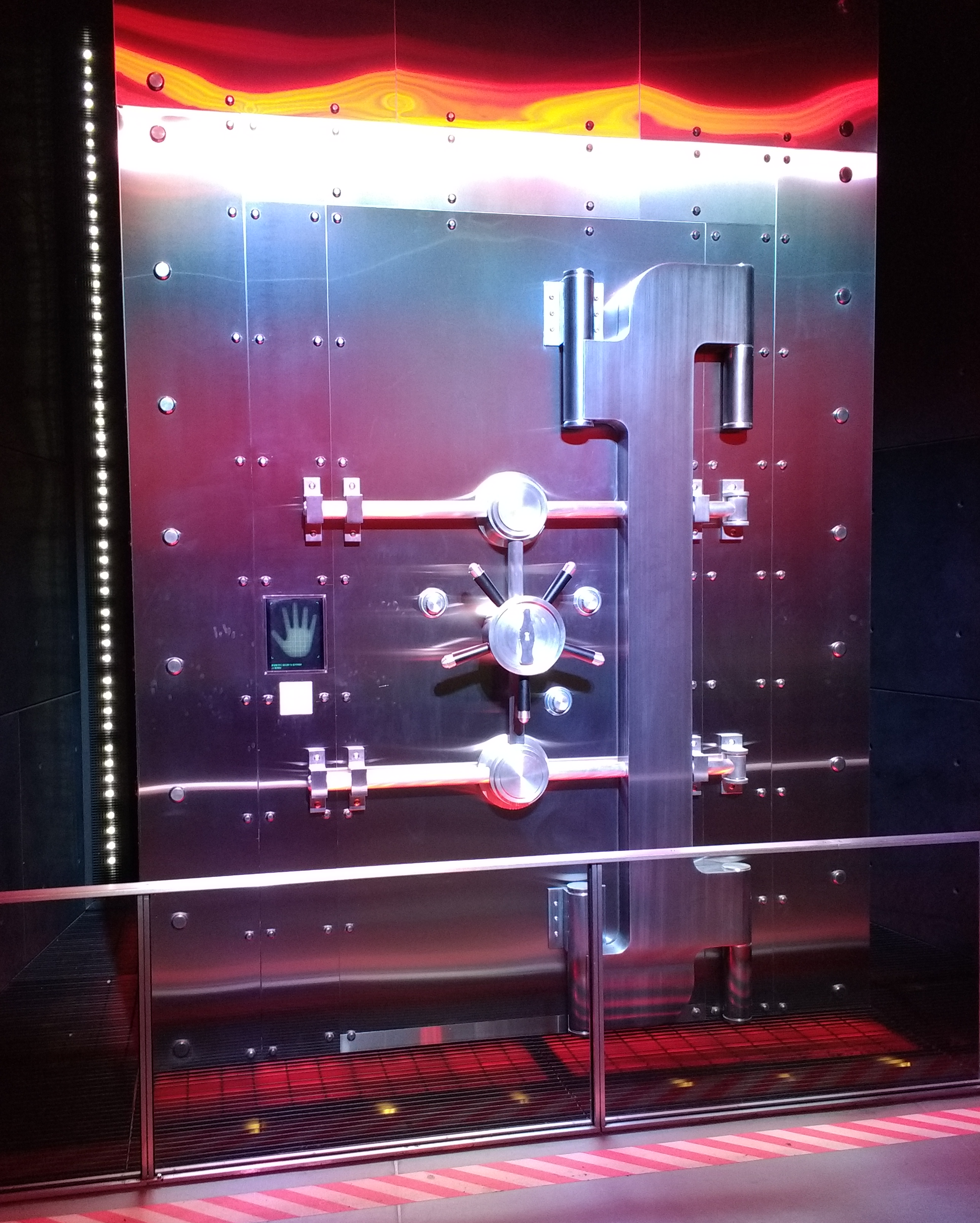
Vault alleged to contain the secret formula at the World of Coca-Cola in Atlanta

Coca-Cola inventor John Pemberton shared his original formula with at least four people before his death in 1888. In 1891, Asa Candler purchased the rights to the formula from Pemberton's estate, founded the Coca-Cola Company, and instituted the secrecy about the formula. He also made changes to the ingredients list, which by most accounts improved the flavor, and entitled him to claim that anyone in possession of Pemberton's original formula no longer knew the "real" formula.

In 1919, Ernest Woodruff led a group of investors in purchasing the company from Candler and his family. As collateral for the acquisition loan, Woodruff placed the only written copy of the formula in a vault at the Guaranty Trust Company of New York. In 1925, when the loan had been repaid, Woodruff relocated the written formula to the Trust Company Bank (Truist Financial) in Atlanta. On December 8, 2011, the company placed it in a vault on the grounds of the World of Coca-Cola in Atlanta, with the vault on public display.

According to the company, only two employees are privy to the complete formula at any given time, and they are not permitted to travel together. When one dies, the other must choose a successor within the company and impart the secret to that person. The identity of the two employees in possession of the secret is itself a secret. However, the company's "secret formula" policy is more of a marketing strategy than an actual trade secret: any competitor in possession of the genuine Coke recipe would be unable to obtain key ingredients such as processed coca leaf, and even if all components were available, could not market the product as Coca-Cola.

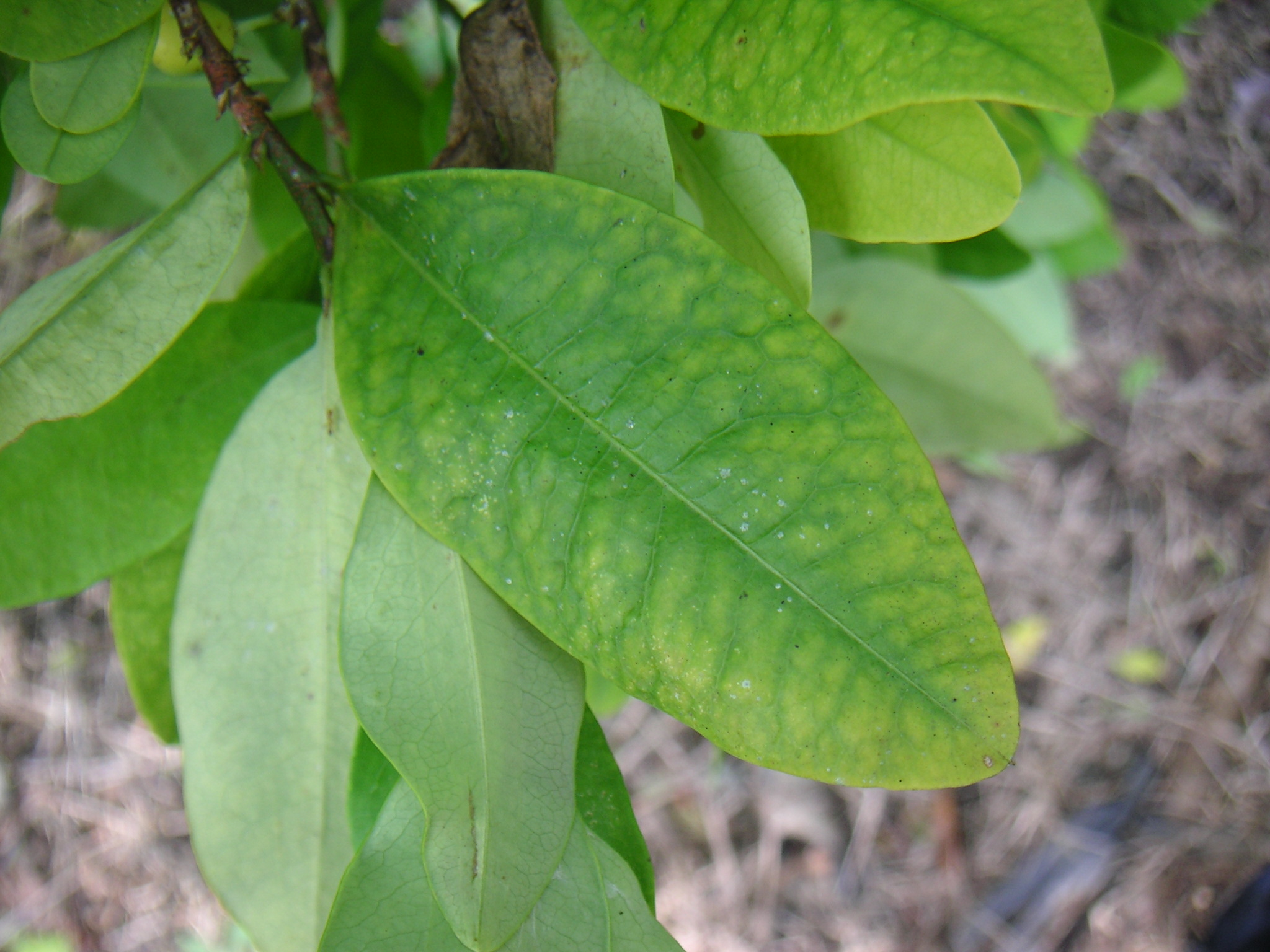
Coca leaves

During the late 19th century, Coca-Cola was one of many coca-based drinks with purported medicinal properties and benefits to health; early marketing materials claimed that Coca-Cola alleviated headaches and acted as a "brain and nerve tonic". Coca leaves were used in Coca-Cola's preparation; the small amount of cocaine they contained – along with caffeine originally sourced from kola nuts – provided the drink's "tonic" quality. In 1903, cocaine was removed, leaving caffeine as the sole stimulant ingredient, and all medicinal claims were dropped. By one account, as of 1983 the FDA continued to screen random samples of Coca-Cola syrup for the presence of cocaine.

Some sources claim that coca leaf chemically processed to remove the cocaine remains part of the formula as a flavoring. According to these accounts, the company obtains the ingredient from the Stepan Company of Maywood, New Jersey, which legally extracts cocaine from coca leaves for use in pharmaceuticals, then sells the processed leaf material for use in Coca-Cola. As of 2006 the company would neither confirm nor deny this, deferring to the secret nature of the formula.

In 1911, the United States government sued the Coca-Cola Company for violations of the Pure Food and Drug Act, claiming that the high concentration of caffeine in Coca-Cola syrup was harmful to health. The case was decided in favor of Coca-Cola, but a portion of the decision was set aside in 1916 by the Supreme Court. As part of a settlement, the company agreed to reduce the amount of caffeine in its syrup.

Joya Williams, a secretary to Coca-Cola's global brand director, conspired to sell the Coca-Cola formula in 2006. Williams, along with her accomplices Ibrahim Dimson and Edmund Duhaney, conspired to sell the confidential trade secret to Pepsi for $1.5 million USD. However, Pepsi reported the illegal offer to Coca-Cola and the FBI. The FBI conducted a sting operation posing as Pepsi executives, leading to the arrest of Williams and her accomplices. Public prosecutor David Nahmias praised Pepsi for doing the right thing: "They did so because trade secrets are important to everybody in the business community. They realize that if their trade secrets are violated, they all suffer, the market suffers and the community suffers."

== Current ingredients ==
The company protects the secrecy of its syrup recipe by shipping ingredients to its syrup factories in the form of anonymous "merchandises", numbered 1 through 9. Factory managers are told the relative proportions of each numbered merchandise, and the mixing procedure, but not the ingredients in the merchandises, some of which are themselves mixtures of other ingredients. Merchandise no. 1 is known to be sugar, in the form of high-fructose corn syrup or sucrose (see variations, below); caramel coloring is no. 2, caffeine is no. 3, and phosphoric acid is no. 4. The identities of merchandises 5 through 9 are a matter of debate – particularly "merchandise 7X" (the "X" has never been explained), which is thought to contain a mixture of essential oils such as orange, lime, lemon, and lavender.

Coca-Cola continues to depend on its namesake, spent coca leaves, as a major flavoring ingredient, which are devoid of any cocaine.

As for kola nut extract, which is the other aspect of the beverage's name, this was originally included for its caffeine content. Kola nuts are likely still in Coca-Cola, to some extent, but chemists believe that additive is probably supplemented primarily by caffeine citrate, a byproduct of the decaffeination of coffee.

The primary taste of Coca-Cola is thought to come from vanilla and cinnamon, with trace amounts of essential oils, coca leaves, and spices such as nutmeg. A 2014 study identified and measured 58 aroma compounds in the top three US brands of cola, confirming significant amounts of compounds found in the essential oils of cinnamon, lemon, orange, neroli, coriander, nutmeg and vanilla.

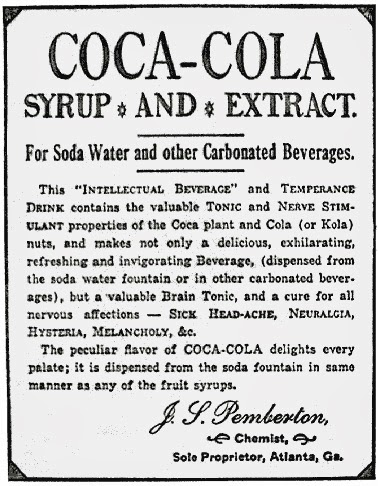
Coca-Cola Advertisement, 1886

== Formula variations in the United States ==
During the 1980s, most U.S. Coca-Cola bottlers switched their primary sweetening ingredient from cane sugar (sucrose) to the cheaper high-fructose corn syrup. As of 2009, the only U.S. bottler still using sucrose year-round was the Coca-Cola Bottling Company of Cleveland, which serves northern Ohio and a portion of Pennsylvania. Many bottlers outside the U.S. also continue to use sucrose as the primary sweetener. Twelve-US-fluid-ounce (355 ml) glass bottles of sucrose-sweetened Coca-Cola imported from Mexico are available in many U.S. markets for those consumers who prefer the sucrose version (see "Mexican Coke", below).

In July 2025, following public comments by U.S. president Donald Trump that the company had agreed to sweeten Coca-Cola with cane sugar, chairman and chief executive James Quincey said Coca-Cola would "expand our trademark Coca-Cola product range with U.S. cane sugar". The company presented the sucrose-sweetened drink as an additional product rather than a reformulation, with the flagship U.S. recipe continuing to use high-fructose corn syrup.

=== Passover ===
Coca-Cola was certified kosher in 1935 by Rabbi Tobias Geffen after beef tallow-derived glycerin was replaced with vegetable glycerin. However, the high-fructose corn syrup used by most U.S. bottlers since the 1980s is kitniyot (derived from grain/seeds/legumes) by the definitions of Jewish kosher law, and therefore forbidden to Ashkenazi Jews during Passover according to certain traditions. Each year, in the weeks leading up to Passover, bottlers in markets with substantial Jewish populations switch to sucrose sweetener in order to obtain Kosher for Passover certification.

=== "New Coke" ===
In April 1985, in response to marketing research suggesting that a majority of North American consumers preferred the taste of rival Pepsi to Coca-Cola, the company introduced a sweeter, less effervescent version of Coca-Cola in the U.S. and Canada. Although the new formulation had beaten both Pepsi-Cola and the old Coke formula in multiple blind taste tests, consumer response was overwhelmingly negative. The company reintroduced the original beverage, rebranded as "Coca-Cola Classic", while continuing to market the new version as simply "Coke".

The new version remained on the market, in North America only, for 17 years—the last 10 as "Coke II"—until it was discontinued in 2002. The "Classic" designation remained on the original product's label, its prominence gradually decreasing over the years, until it was removed entirely in 2009.

=== Mexican Coke ===
In the early 2000s, cane-sugar-sweetened Coca-Cola produced in Mexico began to appear in bodegas and Hispanic supermarkets in the Southwestern United States; in 2005, Costco began offering it. All were obtaining the Mexican product—which was not labeled in accordance with U.S. food labeling laws—outside the official Coca-Cola distribution network. In 2009, the Coca-Cola Company began officially importing Coca-Cola produced in Mexico, with proper labeling, for distribution through official channels.

== Purported revelations of the secret recipe ==
=== Pemberton recipe ===
Coca-Cola inventor John Pemberton is said to have written the following recipe in his diary shortly before his death in 1888. The recipe does not specify when or how the ingredients are mixed, nor the flavoring oil quantity units of measure (though it implies that the "Merchandise 7X" was mixed first). This was common in recipes at the time, as it was assumed that preparers knew the method.

Ingredients:

- 1 oz (28 g) caffeine citrate
- 3 oz (85 g) citric acid
- 1 US fl oz (30 ml) vanilla extract
- 1 US qt (946 ml) lime juice
- 2.5 oz (71 g) "flavoring" (i.e., "Merchandise 7X")
- 30 lb (14 kg) sugar
- 4 US fl oz (118.3 ml) fluid extract of coca leaves (flavor essence of the coca leaf)
- 2.5 US gal (9.5 L; 2.1 imp gal) water
- caramel sufficient to give color
- "Mix caffeine, citric acid and lime juice in 1 quart boiling water add vanilla and flavoring when cool."

Flavoring (Merchandise 7X):

- 1 qrt alcohol
- 80 oil orange
- 40 oil cinnamon
- 120 oil lemon
- 20 oil coriander
- 40 oil nutmeg
- 40 oil neroli
- "Let stand 24 hours."

=== Merory recipe ===
Recipe is from Food Flavorings: Composition, Manufacture and Use.

Makes 1 US gallon (3.8 L; 0.83 imp gal) of syrup. Yields 128 6.5 US fl oz (190 ml) bottles at 1 US fl oz (30 ml) per bottle.

- Mix 5 lb (2.3 kg) of sugar with just enough water to dissolve the sugar fully. (High-fructose corn syrup may be substituted for half the sugar.)
- Add 1 1/4 oz (35 g) of caramel, 1/10 oz (3 g) caffeine, and 2/5 oz (11 g) phosphoric acid.
- Extract the cocaine from 5/8 drachm (1.1 g) of coca leaf (Truxillo growth of coca preferred) with toluol; discard the cocaine extract.
- Soak the coca leaves and kola nuts (both finely powdered); 1/5 drachm (0.35 g) in 3/4 oz (21 g) of 20% alcohol.
  - California white wine fortified to 20% strength was used as the soaking solution circa 1909, but Coca-Cola may have switched to a simple water/alcohol mixture.
- After soaking, discard the coca and kola and add the liquid to the syrup.
- Add 1 oz (28 g) lime juice (a former ingredient, evidently, that Coca-Cola now denies) or a substitute such as a water solution of citric acid and sodium citrate at lime-juice strength.
- Mix together
  - 1/4 drachm (0.44 g) orange oil,
  - 1/10 drachm (0.18 g) cassia (Chinese cinnamon) oil,
  - 1/2 drachm (0.89 g) lemon oil, traces of
  - 2/5 drachm (0.71 g) nutmeg oil, and, if desired, traces of
  - coriander,
  - neroli, and
  - lavender oils.
- Add 1/10 oz (2.8 g) water to the oil mixture and let stand for twenty-four hours at about 60 °F (16 °C). A cloudy layer will separate.
- Take off the clear part of the liquid only and add to the syrup.
- Add 7/10 oz (20 g) glycerine (from vegetable source, not hog fat, so the drink can be sold to Jews and Muslims who observe their respective religion's dietary restrictions) and 3/10 drachm (0.53 g) of vanilla extract.
- Add water (treated with chlorine) to make a gallon of syrup.

=== Beal recipe ===
In 2011, Ira Glass announced on his Public Radio International show, This American Life, that show staffers had found a recipe in "Everett Beal's Recipe Book", reproduced in the February 18, 1979 issue of The Atlanta Journal-Constitution, that they believed was either Pemberton's original formula for Coca-Cola, or a version that he made either before or after the product was first sold in 1886. The formula is very similar to the one found in Pemberton's diary. Coca-Cola archivist Phil Mooney acknowledged that the recipe "could be a precursor" to the formula used in the original 1886 product, but emphasized that the original formula is not the same as the one used in the current product.

- Fluid extract of Coca: 3 drams USP
- Citric acid: 3 oz
- Caffeine: 1 oz
- Sugar: 30 lbs
- Water: 2.5 gal
- Lime juice: 2 pints (1 quart)
- Vanilla: 1 oz
- Caramel: 1.5 oz or more for color

The secret 7X flavor (use 2 oz of flavor to 5 gals syrup):

- Alcohol: 8 oz
- Orange oil: 20 drops
- Cinnamon oil: 10 drops
- Lemon oil: 30 drops
- Coriander oil: 5 drops
- Nutmeg oil: 10 drops
- Neroli oil: 10 drops

== See also ==
- List of brand name soft drink products
- List of soft drink flavors
- Open-source cola
- OpenCola
