= Tobias Geffen =

American rabbi

Rabbi Tobias Geffen
- Geffen in 1957

Personal life
- Born: August 1, 1870 Kaunas, Russian Empire
- Died: February 10, 1970 (aged 99) Atlanta, Georgia, U.S.
- Occupation: Leader of Southern division of the Union of Orthodox Rabbis; Leader of Congregation Shearith Israel

Religious life
- Religion: Judaism

Jewish leader
- Residence: Atlanta, Georgia

Tobias Geffen (Hebrew: טוביה גפן; August 1, 1870 – February 10, 1970) was an American Orthodox rabbi. He served as the leader of Congregation Shearith Israel in Atlanta, Georgia, from 1910 to 1970. Geffen is widely known for his 1935 decision that certified Coca-Cola as kosher.

== Biography ==
Geffen was born on August 1, 1870, in the Lithuanian city of Kaunas (called Kovno at the time, part of the Russian Empire). He was ordained by Rabbis Tzvi Rabinowitz of Kovno and Moshe Danishevsky of the Slobodka Yeshivah.

He immigrated to the United States in 1903 and became rabbi of New York's Congregation Ahavat Zedek in New York City. Because of the cramped tenement conditions, he moved to Canton, Ohio, in 1907 to become the rabbi of a small synagogue. He was successful in uniting the community in Canton, but had some health problems. His doctor recommended he move to a warmer climate. Heeding this advice, he moved to Atlanta, Georgia in 1910, where he served as rabbi of Congregation Shearith Israel until his death at age 99.

Geffen organized the first Hebrew school in Atlanta in his own home, as the synagogue could not support a full school. He also initiated a daily community class in Talmud. Geffen also standardized regulation of kosher supervision in the Atlanta area under his central authority. He was the leader of the Southern division of the Union of Orthodox Rabbis.

Geffen published eight books of Talmudic and Biblical exegesis. He died on February 10, 1970. One of his grandsons, David, incorporated parts of his life into a Choose Your Own Adventure-style video game called "The Georgia Variations", used by Gesher Educational Affiliates to educate young Jews about Jewish history.

== Kosher certification of Coca-Cola ==
Since he lived in Atlanta near The Coca-Cola Company's headquarters, Geffen received many inquiries from rabbis across the United States inquiring whether Coca-Cola was kosher and whether it was kosher for Passover. He asked the company for a list of the beverage's ingredients. Geffen was provided with the Coca-Cola formula, a closely guarded trade secret, on the condition that he not disclose the formula.

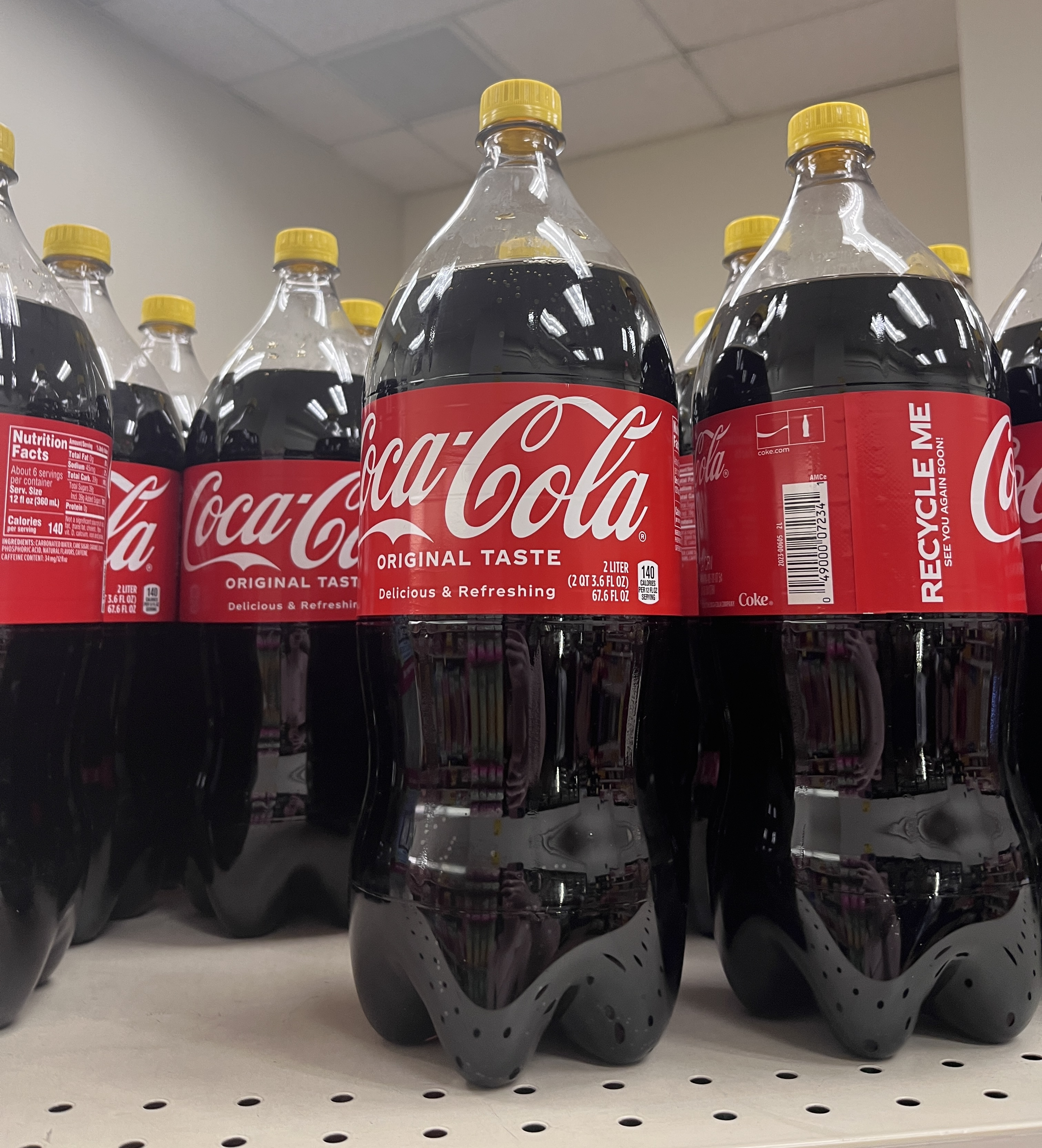
Bottles of Coca Cola with yellow caps, indicating they are kosher for Passover.

Geffen discovered that one ingredient was glycerin produced from tallow from non-kosher beef. He convinced the company to substitute a vegetable-based glycerin.

A similar problem presented itself concerning the use of Coca-Cola during Passover, when Jews are not permitted to consume products derived from grains. One of the sweeteners used in Coca-Cola included traces of alcohol produced from grain, rendering the drink impermissible during Passover. The company's chemists found that a sweetener made from cane sugar and beet sugar could be used without changing the beverage's flavor.

Satisfied that Coca-Cola's ingredients were kosher, Geffen issued a responsum in 1935 that Coca-Cola was kosher for year-round consumption. "With the help of God, I have been able to uncover a pragmatic solution according to which there would be no question nor any doubt concerning the ingredients of Coca Cola", he wrote. "It is now possible for the most stringent Halachist to enjoy Coca Cola throughout the year and on Passover."
