= Parsi Cola =

Cola-flavoured soft drink

- Type: Cola
- Manufacturer: Sasan
- Origin: Iran
- Introduced: Unknown
- Related products: Zamzam Cola

Parsi Cola is a cola-flavoured soft drink produced in Iran by Sasan, which bottles Pepsi in the region along with Iranian brands Orange Shad Noosh & Lemon Shad Noosh. It is popular in parts of the Middle East. In Iran it is the main competitor to Zamzam Cola.
