= Bec Cola =

Carbonated soft drink

- Type: Cola
- Manufacturer: Bec Soda Inc.
- Distributor: Horizon Nature
- Origin: Canada
- Introduced: 2014; 12 years ago
- Flavour: Cola
- Website: bec-cola.com

Bec Cola is a carbonated soft drink sweetened with maple syrup. It is mainly distributed in Canada, France, Belgium, and Switzerland.

== History ==
In 2012, Olivier Dionne, along with the brothers Gwendal and Kevin Creuer, decided to create a soda without using artificial ingredients, after seeing the amount of chemical additives in other colas. It took two years of R&D to replace the chemical additives in generic cola with natural ingredients and a collaboration with the Federation of Quebec Maple Syrup Producers for the supply of maple syrup, as the drink that was developed is 88% maple syrup.

Bec Soda Inc. entered production in August 2014 with $140,000 of the partners' money invested. Two months after its launch, it began to be bottled in Rougemont, Quebec. In the first year, it sold 50,000 bottles, and 500,000 bottles in the first half of 2016. Lime and cranberry variants were introduced in June 2016, and the 100,000-bottle production run was pre-sold.

In March 2020, Coca-Cola launched its own maple-based cola brand (using maple aromas and Quebec-inspired visuals), a threat to Bec Cola's leading position in the maple-based cola niche market.

== Activities ==
Bec Cola is produced by Bec Soda Inc. It contains the following ingredients: Filtered carbonated water, organic maple syrup, organic beet sugar, citric acid, organic caramel colour, and organic cola flavour. 20 tons of maple syrup are necessary to produce 500,000 bottles of Bec Cola.

As of 2016, the company had 1,200 points of sale in Quebec and 1,000 points of sale combined in France, Belgium, and Switzerland. It is also sold in Ontario. The labeling, originally entirely in French, is also printed in English.

In subsequent years, Bec Cola remained commercially active in Canada. Horizon Nature's 2019 English-language catalogue listed Bec Soda among its brands, and a Horizon grocery listing covering March 2020 to April 2021 included Bec Cola maple syrup cola as well as ginger-maple and tonic-maple variants. The BEC COLA trademark was registered in Canada on 26 March 2020 in the name of Bec Soda Inc., with a registration expiry date of 26 March 2030. As of 2026, the original maple-syrup cola continued to be listed for sale by Canadian grocery retailers such as Metro.
