= Peanuts and Coke =

Snack from the Southern United States

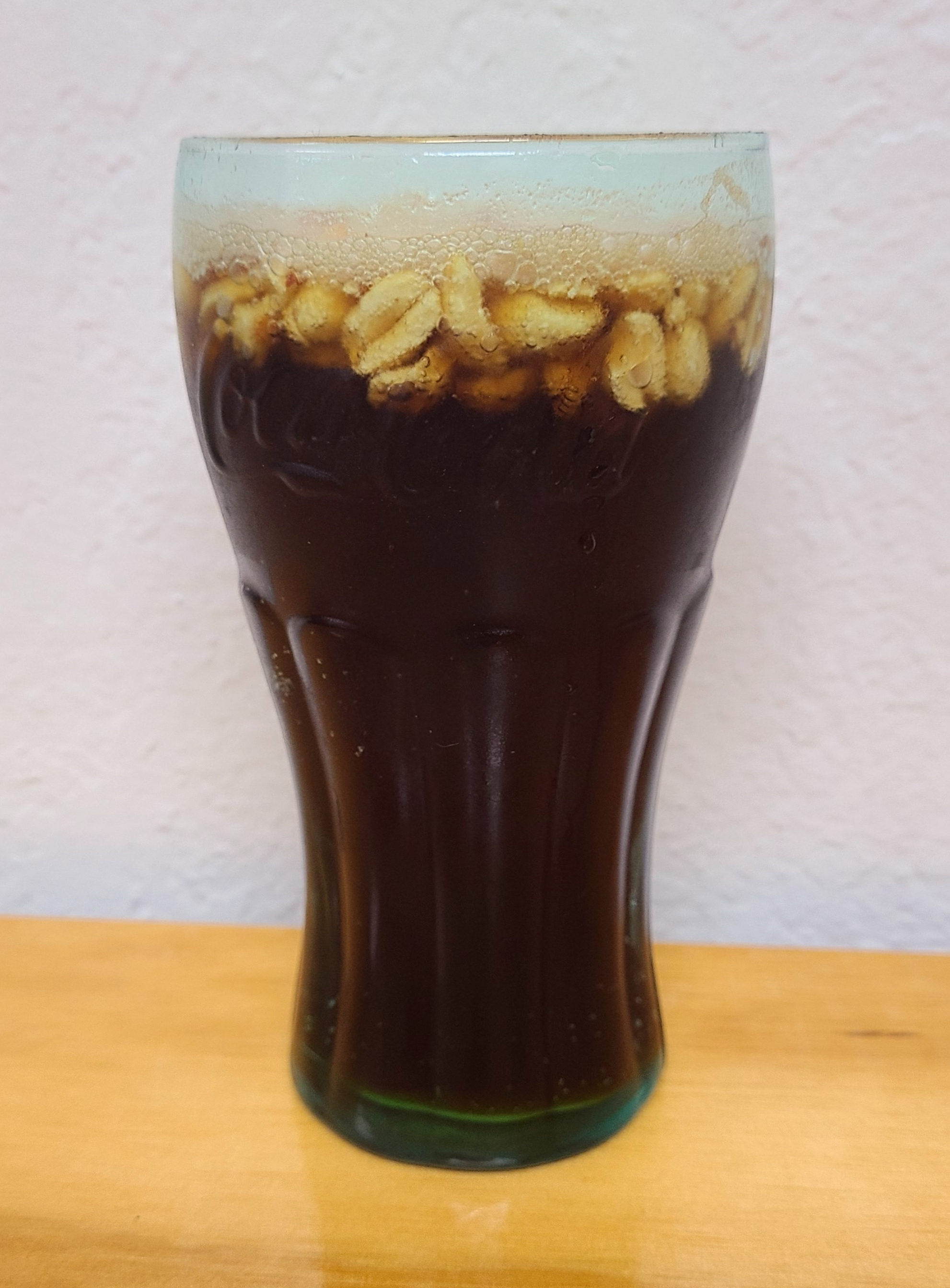
A glass of Peanuts and Coke

Peanuts and coke, sometimes called a "farmer's Coke", is a snack originating in the United States that became popular with agricultural and other blue-collar trades. It is made out of salted roasted peanuts soaked in Coca-Cola.

== Description ==
The most common variation involves pouring salted peanuts into a bottle of Coca-Cola before consuming them together. Traditionally, glass bottles of Coca-Cola were used. The snack's appeal is often attributed to the combination of sweet and salty tastes, as well as the crunchiness of the peanuts. Other variations substitute different nuts or sodas. The combination has been called "the working man’s strawberries in champagne."

== History ==
Writing on the Coca-Cola website, Rick McDaniel speculates that the snack could have developed in the South as early as the 1920s. Writer John T. Edge of the Southern Foodways Alliance recalls that the road trips of his childhood in Jones County, Georgia, were "fueled by a sleeve of roasted and salted peanuts and a glass bottle of Coke". He regards the snack as a form of "prototype fast-food" in the 20th century South.

It became popular in the South as a summer snack, especially in rural areas.

The snack became an internet trend in 2018.
