= Ubuntu Cola =

Soft drink

- Type: Soft drink
- Manufacturer: Ubuntu Trading Company Ltd
- Distributor: Ubuntu Trading Company Ltd
- Origin: United Kingdom
- Introduced: 2007; 19 years ago
- Discontinued: 2019; 7 years ago
- Proof (US): 0
- Colour: caramel
- Flavour: sweet, tart
- Related products: Coca-Cola, Virgin Cola

Ubuntu Cola was a soft drink certified by The Fairtrade Foundation. Made with Fairtrade sugar from Malawi and Zambia, Ubuntu Cola was the first United Kingdom (UK) cola to be Fairtrade certified. It was available for sale in the United Kingdom, Hungary, Sweden, Norway, Denmark, Finland, Ireland, The Netherlands, Belgium, France, Greece, Italy, Switzerland, Poland, Luxembourg and online.

It was available in 330 ml cans, 500 ml polyethylene terephthalate (PET) plastic bottles, and 275 ml glass bottles.

It was produced from 2007 to 2019.

== Name ==
The cola is named after the African philosophy of Ubuntu, which means humanity or fellow feeling; kindness, There is no connection between the cola and the Ubuntu open-source software operating system (also named after the philosophy). Moreover, Ubuntu Cola is not an open-source cola.

== Fairtrade ==
Ubuntu Cola's sugar was sourced from Fairtrade worker cooperatives in Kasinthula, Malawi and Kaleya, Zambia. Farmers who are Kasinthula cooperative members received an income of $4 a day, which was six times the national average income.
