= Zamzam (soft drink) =

Iranian soda brand

Zamzam Cola
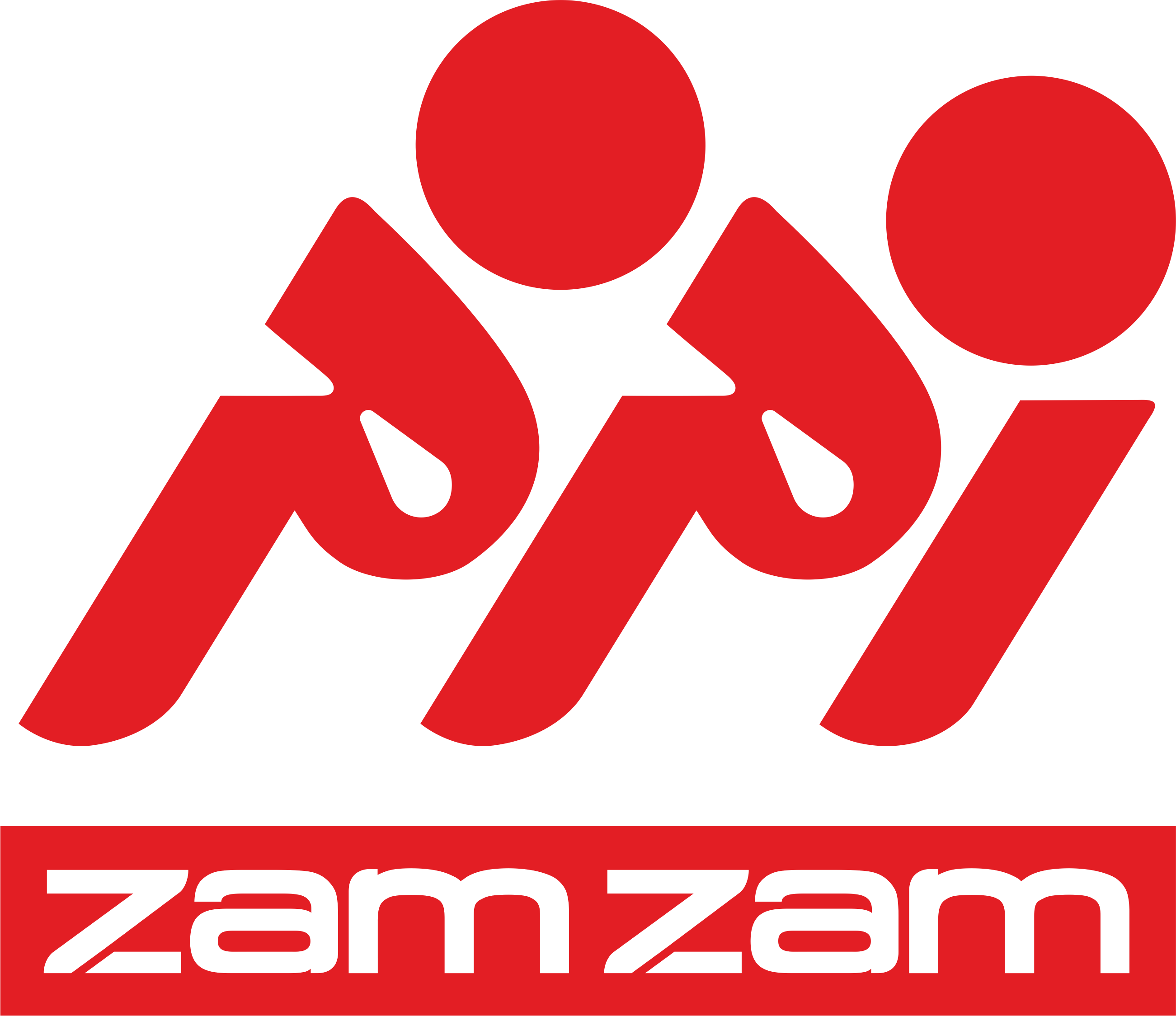
- Type: Carbonated soft drink
- Manufacturer: Zamzam Iran Company
- Origin: Iran
- Introduced: 1954; 72 years ago (as a subsidiary of Pepsi)
- Variants: Lemonade, Cola, Orange, Lemon, Dough, Energizer, Mineral and drinking water
- Related products: Mecca-Cola, Qibla Cola, Eram Cola, Parsi Cola, Cola Turka
- Website: zamzam.ir

Zamzam (Persian: زمزم, Zamzam) is a brand of carbonated soft drinks produced in Iran by Zamzam Group. The director of the Zamzam Group is Saeed Abdollahi-nezhad. Zamzam Group is owned by Sina Industrial Food Holding.

== History ==
Originally a subsidiary of Pepsi created in Iran in 1954 as the first Iranian carbonated soft drink producer owned by Habib Sabet. Following the Islamic revolution in 1979, the company was taken from its original owner and the name was known as Zamzam.

Following the 2002 boycott of Coca-Cola by Saudi Arabia, Zamzam was unofficially dubbed the soft drink of the Hajj. The product's name is a reference to the Well of Zamzam in Mecca, which is one of the stops on the Islamic pilgrimage of the Hajj.
