= Palestine Cola =

Cola-flavoured soft-drink

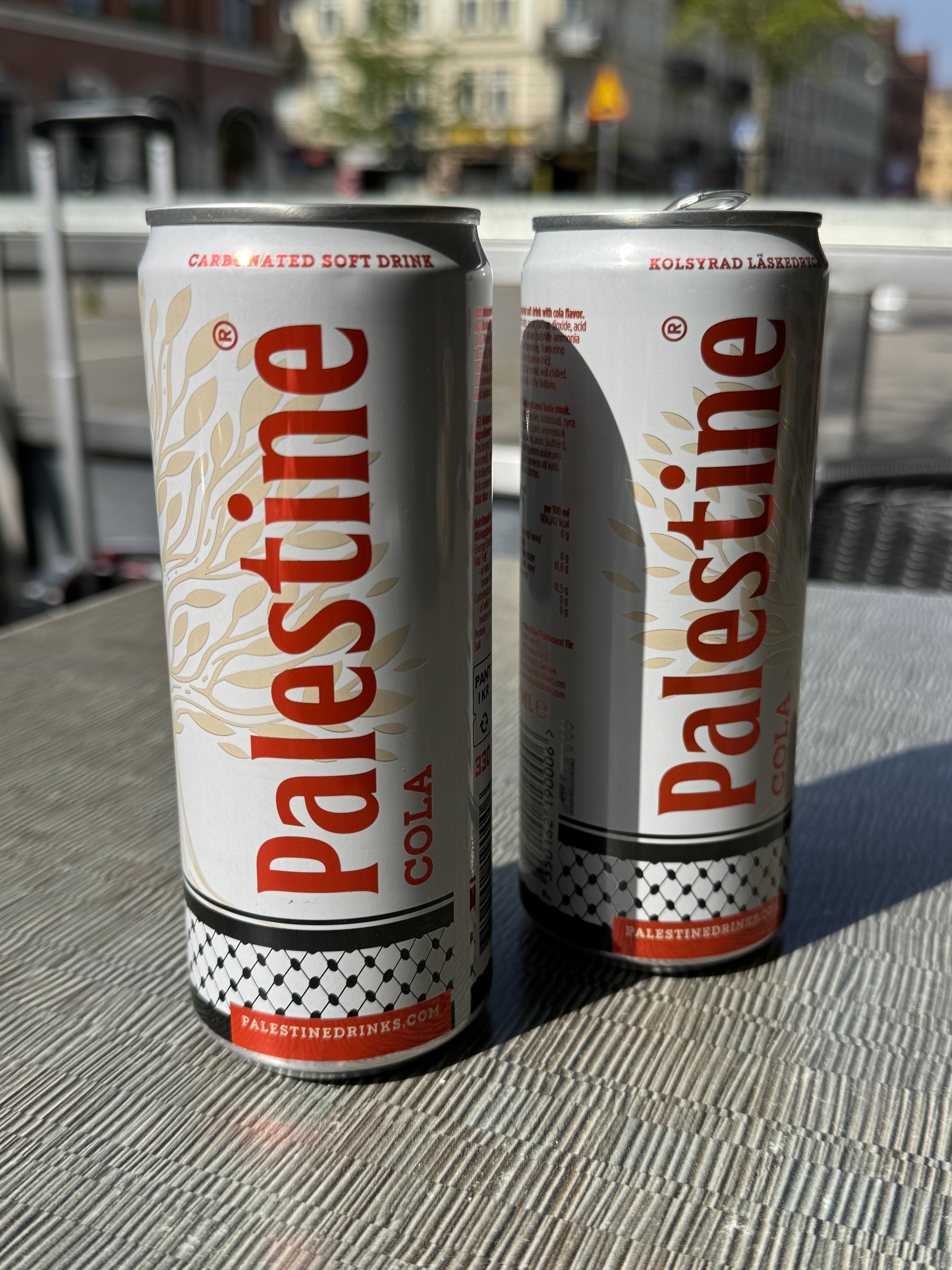
Two cans of Palestine Cola

Palestine Cola is a cola-flavoured soft drink sold by the Malmö-based company Safad Food. The drink was first marketed in February 2024 as an alternative to Coca-Cola and Pepsi, which are being boycotted by some as part of the Boycott, Divestment and Sanctions movement which intensified following the start of the Gaza war. Following initial success in Scania and the rest of Sweden, the company had reportedly begun exporting to the rest of Europe, the United States, South Africa, Sri Lanka, Mauritius and Trinidad and Tobago by October 2025.

Safad Food AB is owned and operated by a group of brothers descended from a family displaced during the 1948 Nakba, Safad is the Arabic name of Safed, now a city in Israeli territory. The company has claimed that they will pay all profits to humanitarian aid in Palestine, but in October 2025, news outlet Sydsvenskan revealed that they had not sent any money to charity organisations in Palestine. In October 2026 however, the newspaper confirmed that Safad Food donated roughly 3 million kr in 2026, despite losing money that year.

Following the launch of Palestine Cola, Safad Food has expanded with the brand Palestine Drinks, including orange and lemon/lime-flavoured soft drinks as well as an energy drink.
