= Green Cola =

Greek brand of cola

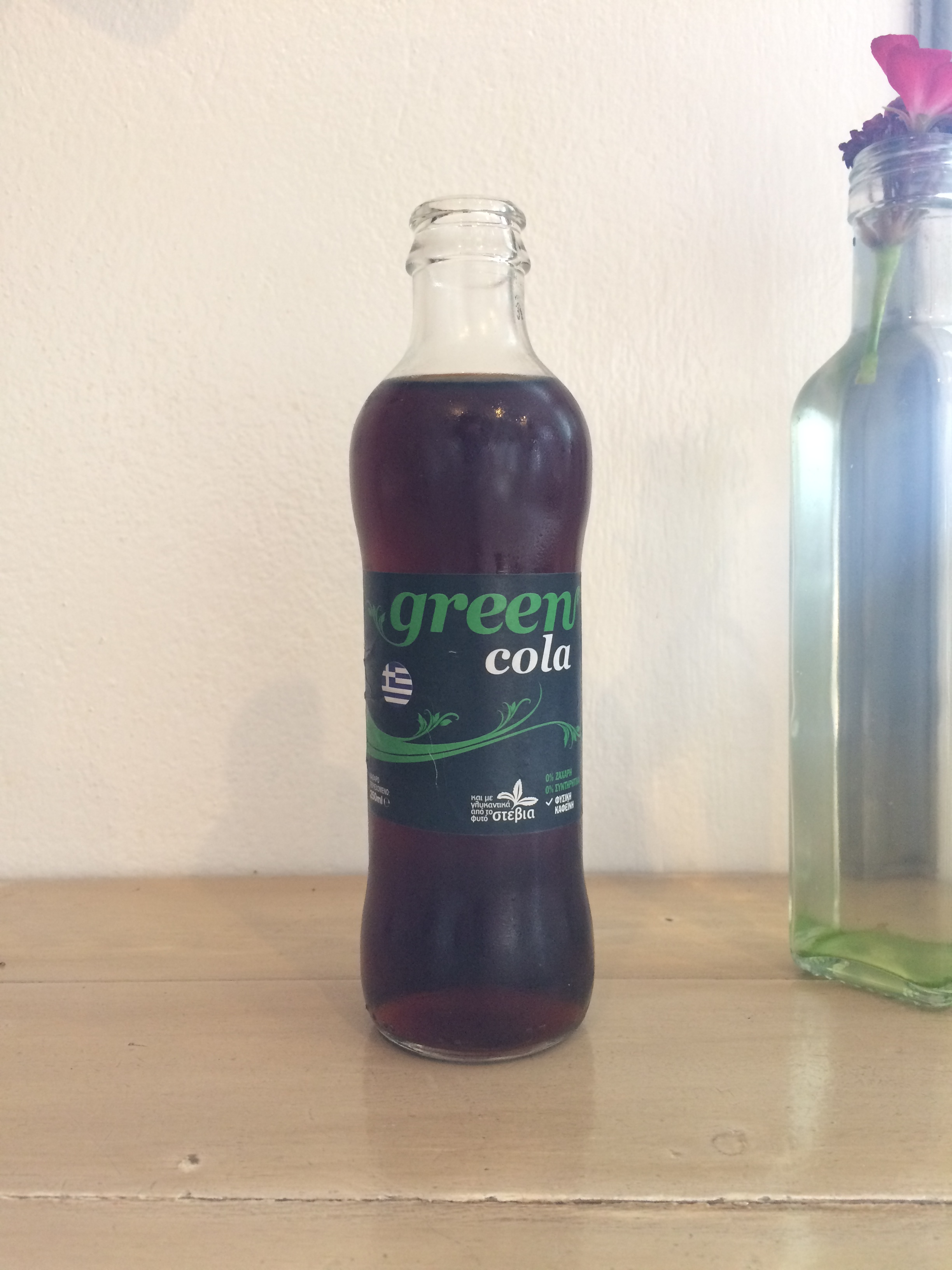
- A bottle of Green Cola
- Type: Soda
- Manufacturer: Green Cola Company
- Origin: Greece
- Introduced: 2012; 14 years ago
- Color: Caramel
- Flavor: Cola
- Ingredients: Carbonated water, colour (caramel E150d), acids (tartaric acid and malic acid), sweeteners (steviol glycosides, sucralose), natural flavouring, natural caffeine

Green Cola is a carbonated soft drink developed by Greek beverages company Green Cola Hellas in Orestiada. Released in 2012, the soda is now widely available in Cyprus, Estonia, Germany, Greece, the United Kingdom, Spain, Latvia, Lithuania, Malta, Romania, the Middle East, Slovenia, Poland and in other countries.

== Description ==
Green Cola was first developed by Green Cola Hellas in Orestiada in 2011, during the height of the Greek debt crisis. Green Cola, a soda sweetened with stevia, became Green Cola Hellas's flagship product. The drink has been branded as having the taste of other colas but "without all of the bad stuff". The beverage became widely distributed in mainland Greece and in the Greek islands. The cola grew in popularity and started being produced in Germany in 2015 and in Spain in 2017; as of 2018, Green Cola is offered for sale in a number of international markets.
