= Dobry (brand) =

Russian soft drink brand

- Product type: Juices, soft drinks
- Current owner: Multon Partners LLC (formerly Coca-Cola HBC)
- Country: Russia
- Introduced: 1998; 28 years ago
- Markets: Russia, CIS
- Website: dobry.ru

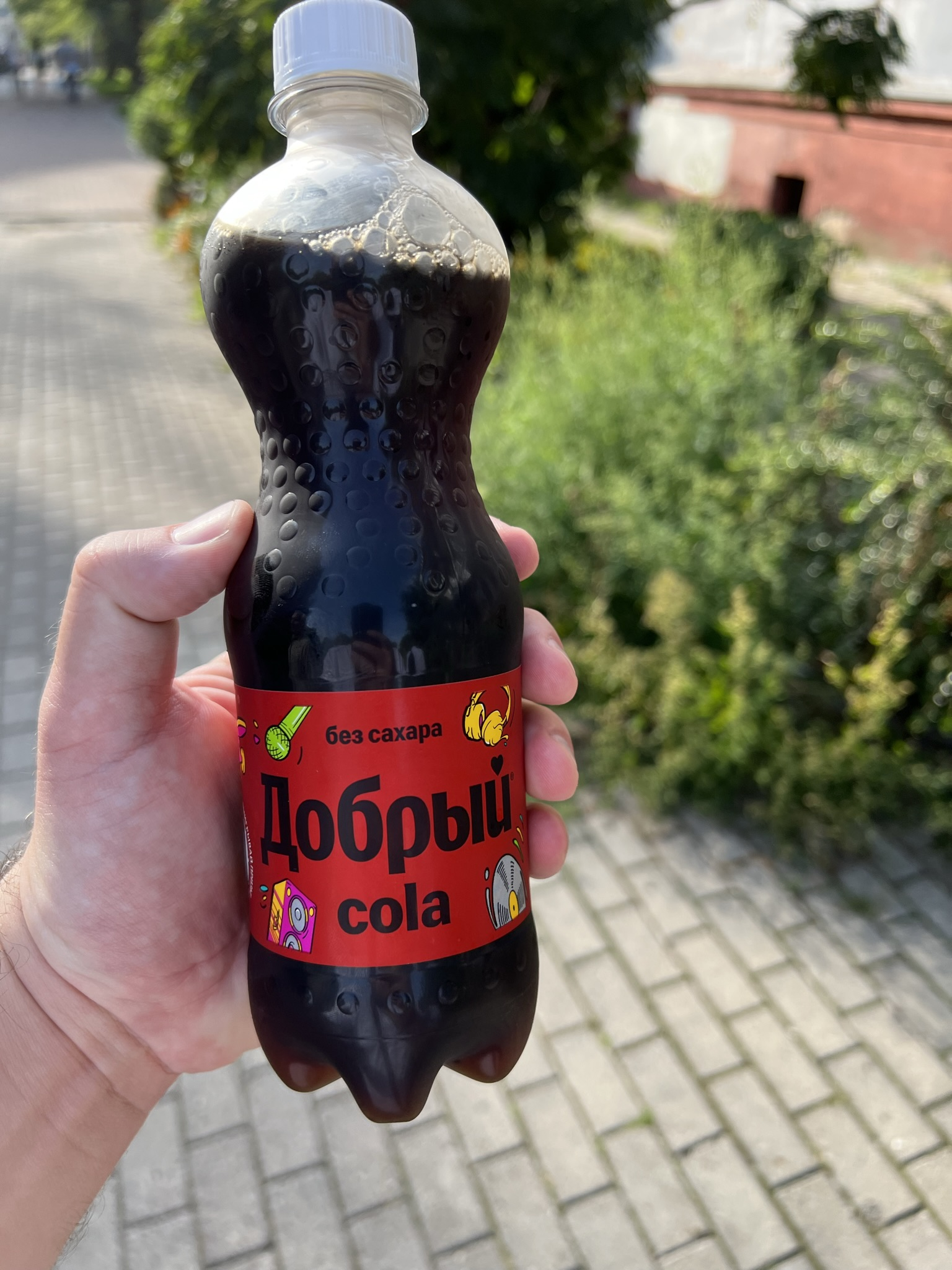
"Dobry Cola without sugar"

Dobry (Russian: Добрый, Good) is a Russian brand of soft drinks. Founded in 1998 by the Multon company. As of 2021, Dobry occupied first place on the Russian market with a share of 23.1%.

== History ==
The Dobry brand was founded in 1998 by the Multon company. Initially, the brand was used for low-priced juices. It was created by Margarita Vasilyeva. Dobry became one of the first Cyrillic juice brands in the history of modern Russia. Its emergence gave rise to an entire naming trend in the juice market, including brands such as Slavny, Lyubimy (PepsiCo), and others. The retail chain Verny, by the owner’s own admission, was named following the same logic as the Dobry juice brand.

On December 19, 1998, the first pilot batch—3,600 liters of Dobry apple juice—was produced at the Multon plant. The design of the first package was created in Saint Petersburg by the firm Coruna. In February 1999, the plant began industrial-scale juice production with an annual capacity of 46 million liters.

By 2004, in addition to juices, the Dobry brand had introduced a line of fruit drinks (morsy), followed later by nectars.

In 2005, Multon became part of the Coca-Cola HBC system in Russia. The main assets of interest were the company’s intangible assets—the management team and strong brands: Rich and Dobry.

In 2008, the product range was expanded to include iced tea.

On August 26, 2022, following the Russian invasion of Ukraine, the Russian subsidiary of Coca-Cola HBC suspended its business operations in Russia and was later renamed Multon Partners. Supplies of concentrate for the production of The Coca-Cola Company’s traditional beverages (Cola, Fanta, Sprite) were discontinued, and from March 2022 Russian plants stopped receiving the syrup required to produce the branded drinks. After the cessation of branded beverage production in Russia, the company introduced a similar local brand, Dobry, for which the Russian division sources raw materials domestically and uses a different concentrate formulation. Multon Partners remains owned by the Dutch company Coca-Cola HBC Holdings B.V.

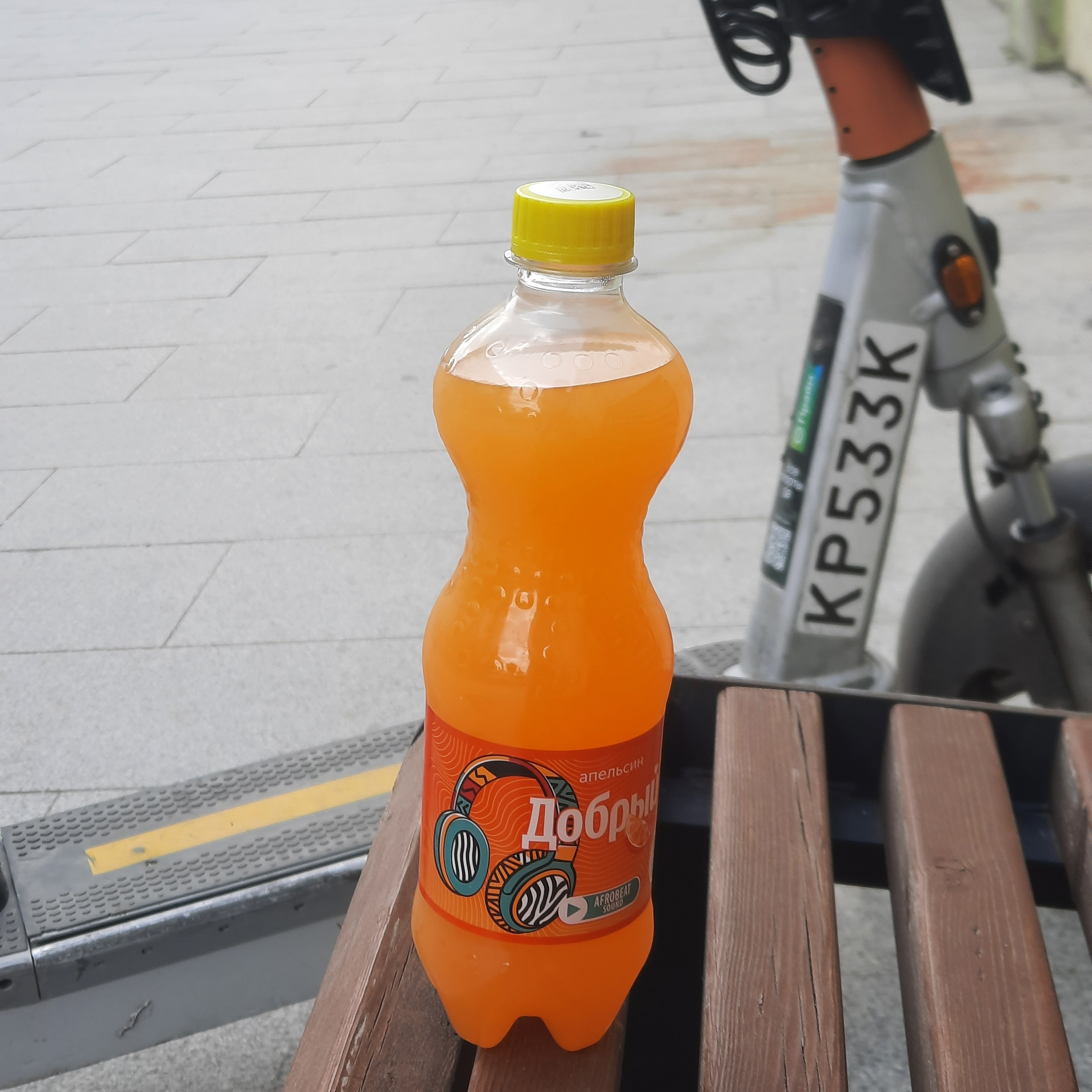
"Dobryi Apelsin"
