= OpenCola (drink) =

Brand of open-source cola

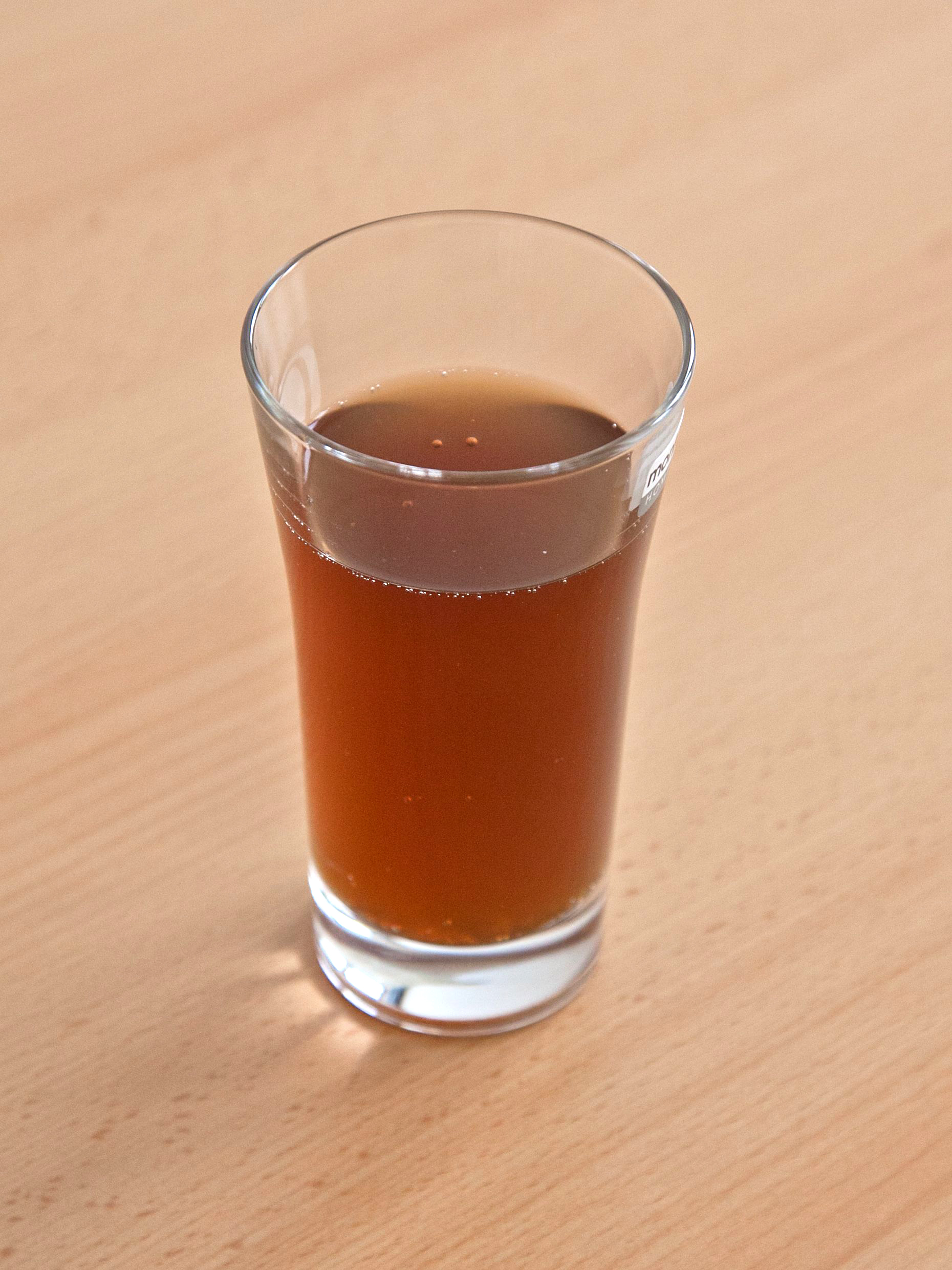
- Type: Cola
- Introduced: 1999; 27 years ago

OpenCola is a brand of open-source cola whose list of ingredients and preparation instructions are freely available and modifiable. Anybody can make the drink, and anyone can modify and improve on the recipe. It was launched in 1999 by the later-defunct free software P2P company Opencola, to promote their company.

== Background ==
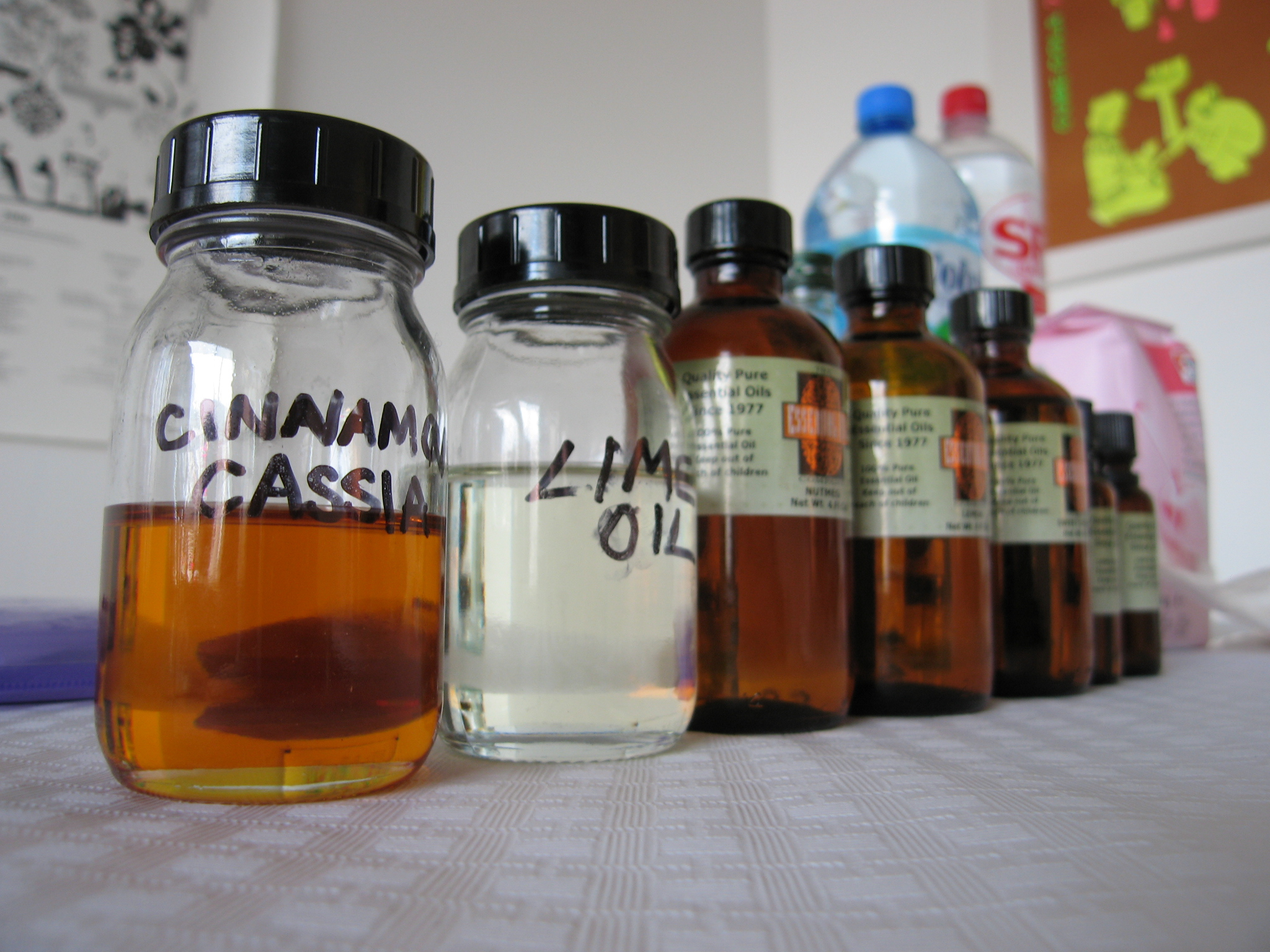
Flavouring oils used in OpenCola

The original version 1.0 was released on 27 January 2001 by Grad Conn, Cory Doctorow, and John Henson under the GNU General Public License. The released version is 1.1.3, as of 20 February 2001. Although originally intended as a promotional tool to explain free and open source software, the drink took on a life of its own and 150,000 cans were sold. The Toronto-based company Opencola shut down in 2003, having become better known for the drink than for the software it was supposed to promote. Laird Brown, the company's senior strategist, attributed its success to a widespread mistrust of big corporations and the "proprietary nature of almost everything".

There is a flavouring and concentrated formula for OpenCola. The full recipe also includes instructions for home-made soda water produced from basic ingredients such as yeast and sugar in order to make the entire process open source, otherwise there would be a need to use commercially produced bottled or canned soda, or consumer carbonation machines with commercially manufactured carbon dioxide canisters.

== See also ==
- Free Beer, open-source beer, formerly known as Our Beer (Danish: Vores øl)
