= Pietra Brewery =

Corsican brand of beer

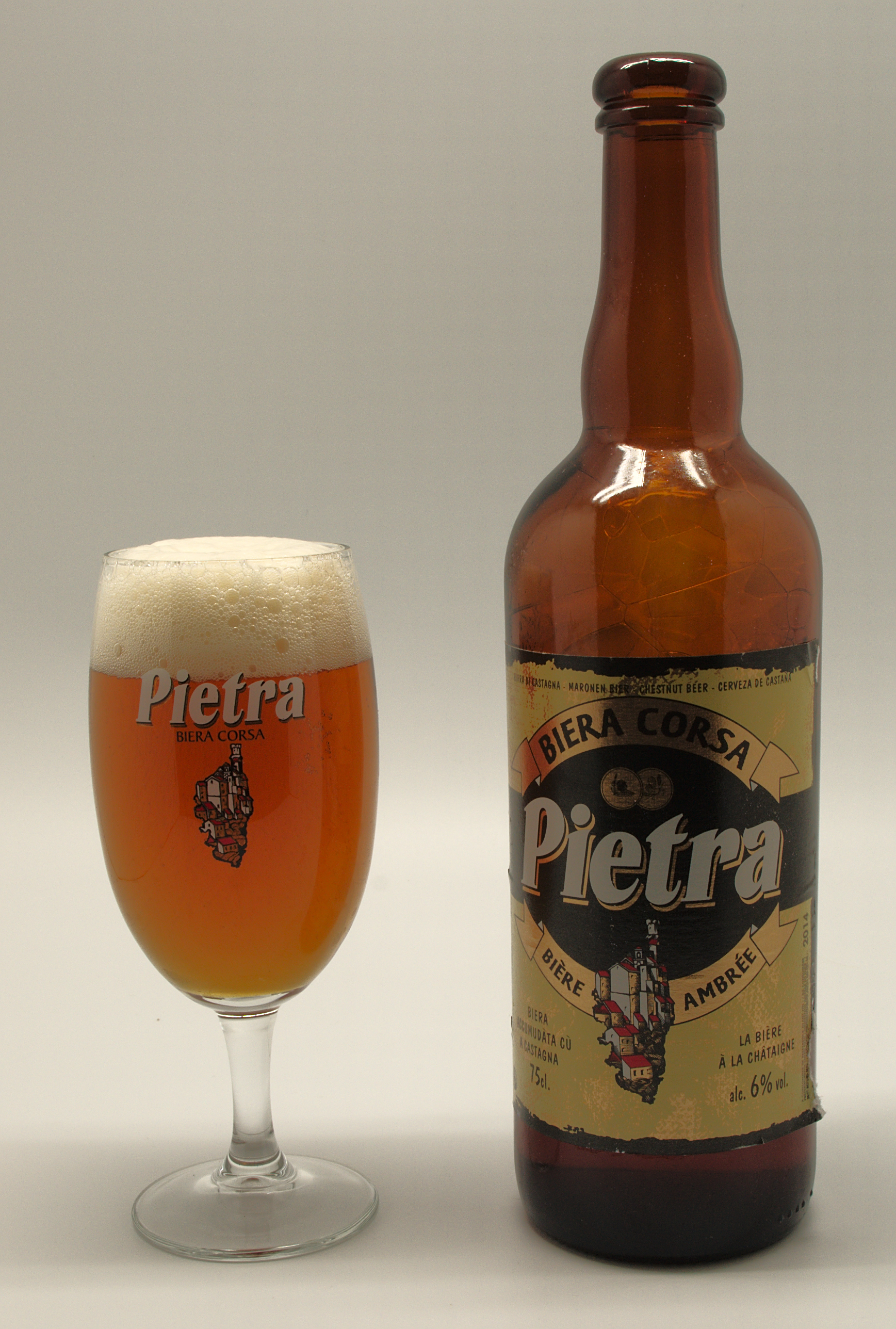
- Pietra Brewery logo
- Location: Route de La Marana; 20600 FURIANI; France
- Opened: 1996
- Annual production volume: 25,000 hectolitres (21,000 US bbl)

Active beers
Name	Type
Pietra	Amber Beer
Colomba	White Beer
Serena	Pure Malt Blond Beer

Pietra, which means "stone" in Italian (petra is the Corsican equivalent) and is also known as "A biera corsa", is a brand of beer from the Mediterranean French island of Corsica.

== History ==
The Pietra Brewery opened in 1996. The name "Pietra" comes from Pietraserena, the Corsican home village of the brewery’s founder.

Pietra beer is a 6% ABV amber beer brewed from a blend of malt and chestnut flour. Chestnuts have long been used in Corsica as a cereal, but it took many years of research to validate the qualities of chestnut flour. The high fermentability of chestnuts helps maintain the beer's head and contributes to Pietra beer's golden color.

The annual production of Pietra beer is over 25,000 hectolitres.

== Other beers brewed by Pietra ==
- Serena (5% ABV) has a very light head and is just slightly bitter.
- Colomba is an un-pasteurized white beer perfumed with herbes du maquis (strawberry tree, myrtle, cistus, and juniper).

== Corsica Cola ==
Pietra brewery has also produced Corsica Cola, a non-alcoholic soft drink, since 2003.
