= Heineken =

Dutch pale lager beer Heineken

Heineken Lager Beer Heineken Pilsener

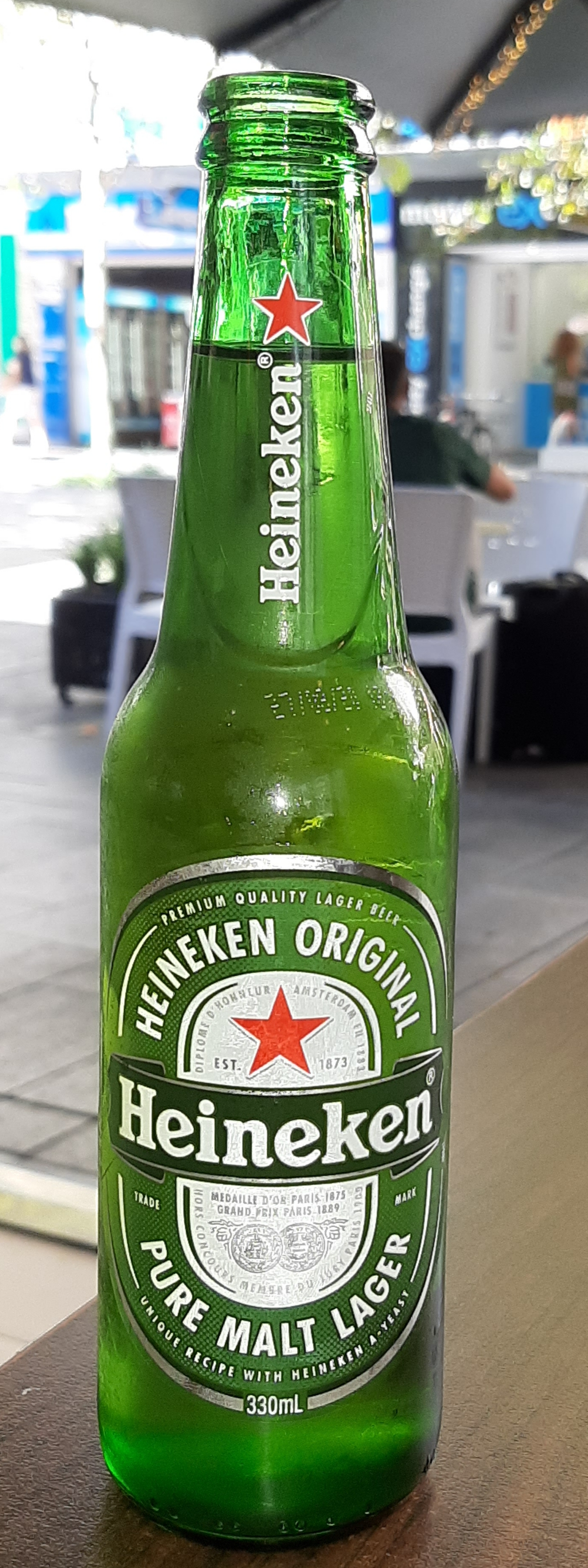
- Current export bottle
- Type: Beer
- Manufacturer: Heineken N.V.
- Origin: Netherlands
- Introduced: 1873; 153 years ago
- Alcohol by volume: 5.0%
- Colour: 7 EBC
- Style: Pale lager
- Original gravity: 1.044–1.048
- IBU scale: 23
- Related products: Heineken Oud Bruin; Heineken Premium Light; Heineken Tarwebok
- Website: heineken.com

Heineken Lager Beer (Dutch: Heineken Pilsener), or simply Heineken (pronounced [ˈɦɛinəkə(n)]), is a Dutch pale lager beer with 5% alcohol by volume, produced by the Dutch brewing company Heineken N.V. It is typically sold in a green bottle with a red star.

== History ==
On 15 February 1864, Gerard Adriaan Heineken (1841–1893) bought De Hooiberg (The Haystack) brewery on the Nieuwezijds Achterburgwal canal in Amsterdam, a popular working class brand founded in 1592. In 1873 after hiring Dr. Elion, a student of French chemist Louis Pasteur to develop a suitable yeast for Bavarian bottom fermentation, the HBM (Heineken's Bierbrouwerij Maatschappij) was established, and the first Heineken brand beer was brewed. In 1875 Heineken won the Medaille D'Or at the International Maritime Exposition in Paris and it began to be shipped there regularly, after which Heineken sales topped 6.4 million litres (1.7 million U.S. gallons), making them the largest beer exporter to France at the time.

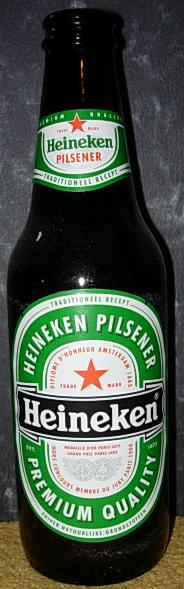
Old Dutch bottle

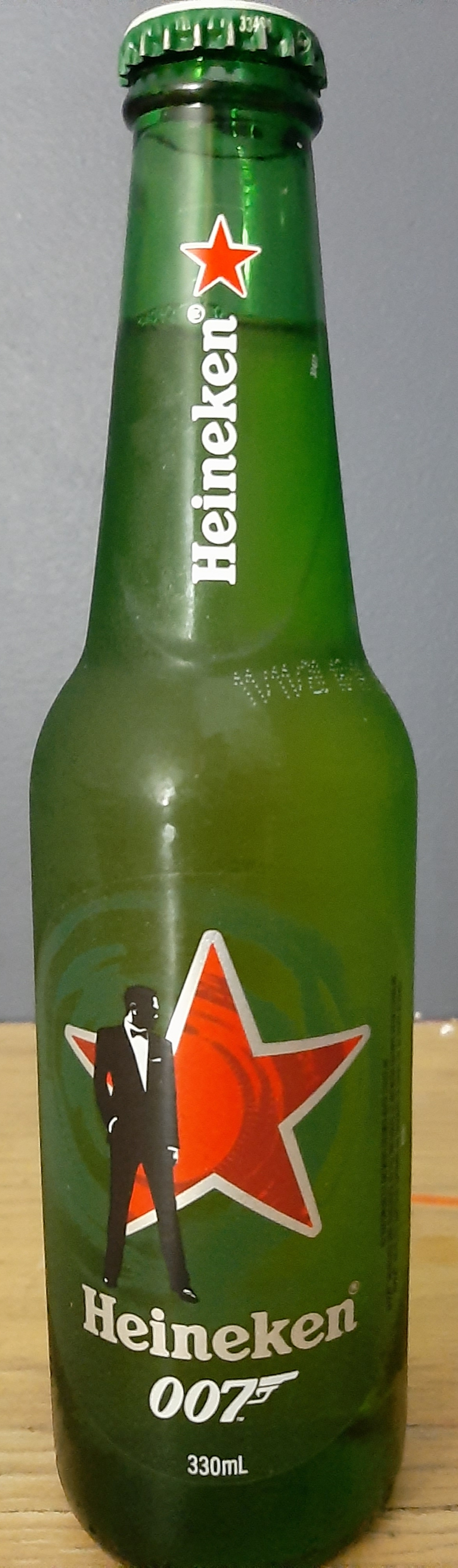
James Bond 007 Edition

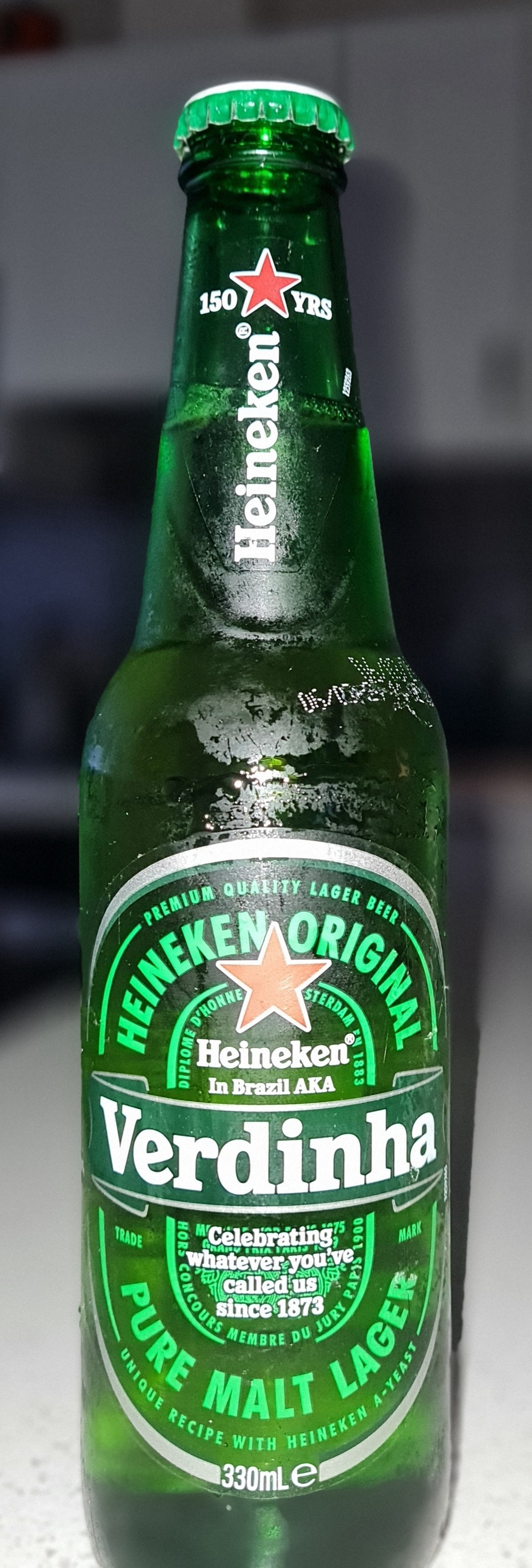
330 mL Heineken special bottle, limited. The name 'Verdinha' in this specific bottle is Portuguese for "Little Green", which is the way many people call the brand in Brazil due to the green colour of the bottles.

In Heineken's early years, the beer won four awards:

- Medaille d'Or (gold medal) at the International Maritime Exhibition (International Exhibition of Marine and River Industries) in Paris in May 1875.
- Diplome d'Honneurs (Honorary Diploma) at the International Colonial and Export Exhibition in Amsterdam in 1883.
- Grand Prix (Grand Prize) at the Exposition Universelle in Paris in 1889.
- Hors Concours Membre du Jury in Paris in 1900.

All four awards are still mentioned on the label

In 2013, Heineken joined other alcohol producers as part of a producers' commitments to reducing harmful drinking.

In February 2013, Heineken stopped producing the brown bottles used for the Dutch market in favour of the green colour of bottles it already used for exports.

In 2014, Heineken celebrated its 150th anniversary. In 2015, Heineken won the Creative Marketer of the Year Award, becoming the second company to win the award twice.

The original brewery where Gerard Adriaan Heineken first started making Heineken is now the Heineken Experience museum.

Heineken 0.0

A can of Heineken 0.0 Formula One Edition.

Heineken launched its first non-alcoholic beer in 2017, naming it "Heineken 0.0". It was evaluated positively in terms of taste, with "almost the same taste" as the full-alcohol version, even though Heineken does not claim it to be of the same taste. It was also found to be lower in calories and sugar than a soda.

== Production ==
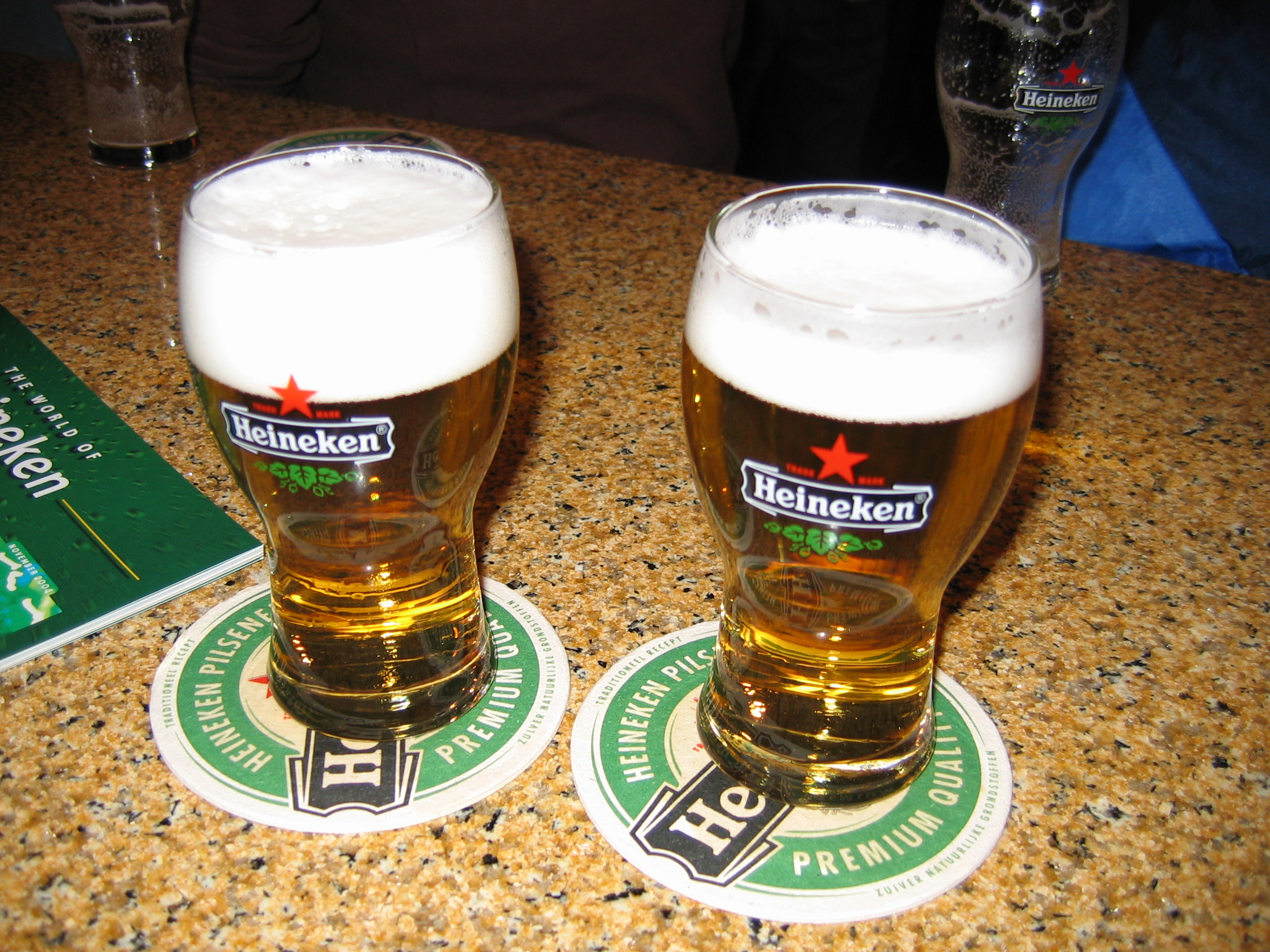
Two glasses of Heineken beer

Since 1975, most Heineken-brand beer has been brewed at their brewery in Zoeterwoude, Netherlands.

Heineken also began brewing in the United Kingdom in 1996 when they acquired Scottish & Newcastle. Heineken has since expanded its brewing operations in the UK, with more than 90% of its beers sold in the UK brewed locally. In 2011, 2.74 billion litres of Heineken-brand beer were produced worldwide, while the total beer production of all breweries fully owned by the Heineken Group over all brands was 16.46 billion litres globally. As of 2022, Heineken is sold in 192 countries. They have also been incorporated with numerous beer brands in countries all over the world, including Mexico, China, Australia and various countries in Africa.

== Advertising ==
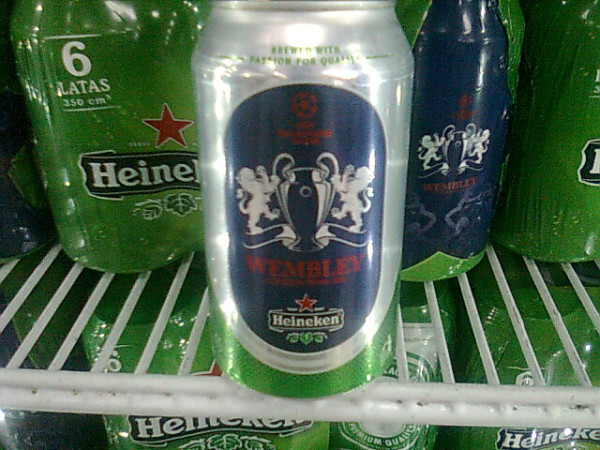
Heineken sponsoring the 2011 UEFA Champions League final

In the UK, Heineken became particularly associated with the slogan "Refreshes the Parts Other Beers Cannot Reach" in the late 20th century, described by Campaign magazine as "one of the most famous ad campaigns of the 20th century". The slogan was coined by Terry Lovelock of the Collett Dickenson Pearce agency. Despite its success, Lovelock and his creative partner Vernon Howe struggled to devise a campaign in response to Heineken's brief, which consisted of the single word "refreshment". Having initially been given a month to develop the campaign by Collett Dickenson Pearce managing director Frank Lowe, the pair struggled to come up with anything, until they travelled to Morocco for a photoshoot undertaken for Ford, when Lovelock woke at 3am with the phrase in his mind, and wrote two advert scripts based on it, which were sold to Heineken. Although advertising research found that the filmed versions of the scripts were unlikely to succeed in promoting the brand, both the advertising firm and client ignored this, and the adverts won the Design and Art Direction Black Pencil award in 1975 as the year's best TV campaign. The phrase would later be named as the 19th greatest advertising slogan by Creative Review, passed into everyday speech in the UK, and was borrowed by the then Prince Charles in the early 1990s when he wrote in a book on watercolour painting that it "refreshes parts of the soul which other activities can't reach". It was discontinued in the late 1990s.

Heineken was the major sponsor of UEFA Champions League and the UEFA Super Cup, UEFA Euro and Rugby World Cup; major sponsorship of Rugby Union had begun in Wales with the Welsh Premier Division competition.

In 1989 "10 Green Bottles Hanging On The Wall" was a popular advert.

Dating back to 1997's Tomorrow Never Dies, Heineken has retained a longstanding relationship with the Bond franchise, consecutively being featured in 8 of their films, including No Time To Die (2021). While it is usually the supporting characters seen drinking Heineken, Bond himself is seen drinking Heineken beer in Skyfall (2012) and Spectre (2015). As a long-term brand investment, Heineken reportedly spent €60 million for its inclusion in Skyfall, more than double the amount of Bond actor Daniel Craig's pre-residual salary. As of 2015, it is the brand's largest global marketing platform.

In 2016, Heineken became the Official Beer of the FIA Formula One World Championship starting from the Canadian Grand Prix. During races, Heineken also puts its "When You Drink, Never Drive" advertising campaign all over the race as a campaign to end drunk driving.

In August 2021, Heineken signed a multi-year deal with W Series as the global partner for all-Women single-seater racing series.

Starting with the 2020–24 cycle, Heineken became the sponsors of UEFA Europa League and UEFA Europa Conference League through Heineken 0.0 brands. In 2023, Heineken celebrated its 150th anniversary.

== The Boring Phone ==
Heineken in collaboration with Bodega released a transparent dumbphone called 'The Boring Phone'. It was made by Human Mobile Devices and was unveiled at Milan Design Week on 18 April 2024 with a party, and only 5,000 units were manufactured. It lasts for a week on standby mode using a single charge and provides around 20 hours of talk time (2G) and 6 hours of talk time (3G/4G) and cannot download apps. An app has been launched called "The Boring Mode" which has the ability to block apps for people who can't get their hands on a Boring Phone. It also has some games also featured on the Boring Phone like 1-Bit Email, Quick Snake, Taxi App, Sports Check, a Camera, etc. The Boring Phone charges with Micro USB, has 128MB internal storage, a MicroSD slot up to 32GB and a 1450mAh removable battery. It supports 2G, 3G and 4G technology with Bluetooth 4.2 and an AV (audio-video) jack. It also has FM radio, Dual SIM, a 0.3MP camera, internal 2.8" QVGA display and external 1.77" QQVGA. Its dimensions are 108 x 55 x 18.9mm and weighs 123g.

== Activities in Russia ==
At the end of March 2022, over a month after Russia started its war in Ukraine, Heineken announced that it was leaving Russia (including with its other brands there, like Affligem, Amstel etc.), saying that ownership of the Russian subsidiary was no longer "durable or viable." But despite this promise Heineken hired more than 240 new staff and launched 61 new products on the Russian market that year, according to investigators from Follow the Money, based on an overview of 2022 by Heineken Russia. The Dutch brewer's Russian subsidiary looked back on "a turbulent year, with many new growth opportunities." One of these opportunities being the departure of Coca-Cola and Pepsi from Russia, which Heineken "cynically" used to "enter the non-alcoholic carbonated beverage market". Heineken announced even more investments for 2023, including more modern packaging and new flavours. However, in August 2023, the company announced it had received necessary approvals to sell its Russian operations to Arnest Group for €1 plus a €100M commitment to repay domestic debt, completing its withdrawal process. The company expected a total loss of €300 million as a result of the deal.
