= LA Ice Cola =

Soft drink in Australia

LA Ice-Cola
- 2.25L bottle of LA maxi ICE
- Type: Cola
- Manufacturer: Refresco
- Origin: Australia
- Introduced: 2000; 26 years ago
- Related products: RC Cola

LA Ice Cola is a cola-flavoured carbonated drink distributed in Australia and was owned by Tru Blu Beverages until 2022, when it taken over by Refresco.

== History ==
LA Ice Cola was launched in Australia in 2000.

LA Ice Cola was the first cola brand in Australia to introduce a coffee-flavoured cola drink.

== Description ==
LA Ice Cola is similar to RC Cola, with a distinct caramel flavour. It is mainly distributed in supermarkets and independent service stations.

The "LA" in the brand name has no meaning, and was selected because the marketing department decided the name would roll off the tongue.

Flavours:

- LA Ice (Original flavour)
- LA Maxi Ice (Sugar free with enhanced flavour)
- LA Ice No Sugar Cola (Sugar free without enhanced flavour)
- LA Diet Ice Cola (Diet variety) - discontinued
- LA Coffee Ice Cola - discontinued
- LA Ice Café Cola (Coffee flavour) - discontinued
