= Bottega =

Bottega may refer to:

- Bottega Veneta, an Italian luxury fashion house
- Bottega Giotti, a Florence-based fashion company specializing in woven leather jackets, bags and small leather goods
- Bottega Louie, a Los Angeles-based Italian restaurant, gourmet market, and French patisserie
- Bottega University, a distance-learning university headquartered in Salt Lake City, Utah
- The Jeweller's Shop (also known simply as Bottega dell'orefice in Italian), a 1988 Italian-Austrian-Canadian-German drama film
- La Bottega dell'Arte (also known simply as Bottega dell'Arte), an Italian pop music group active between 1974 and 1985

== See also ==
- Bodega (disambiguation)
