= Heineken Oud Bruin =

Brand of beer

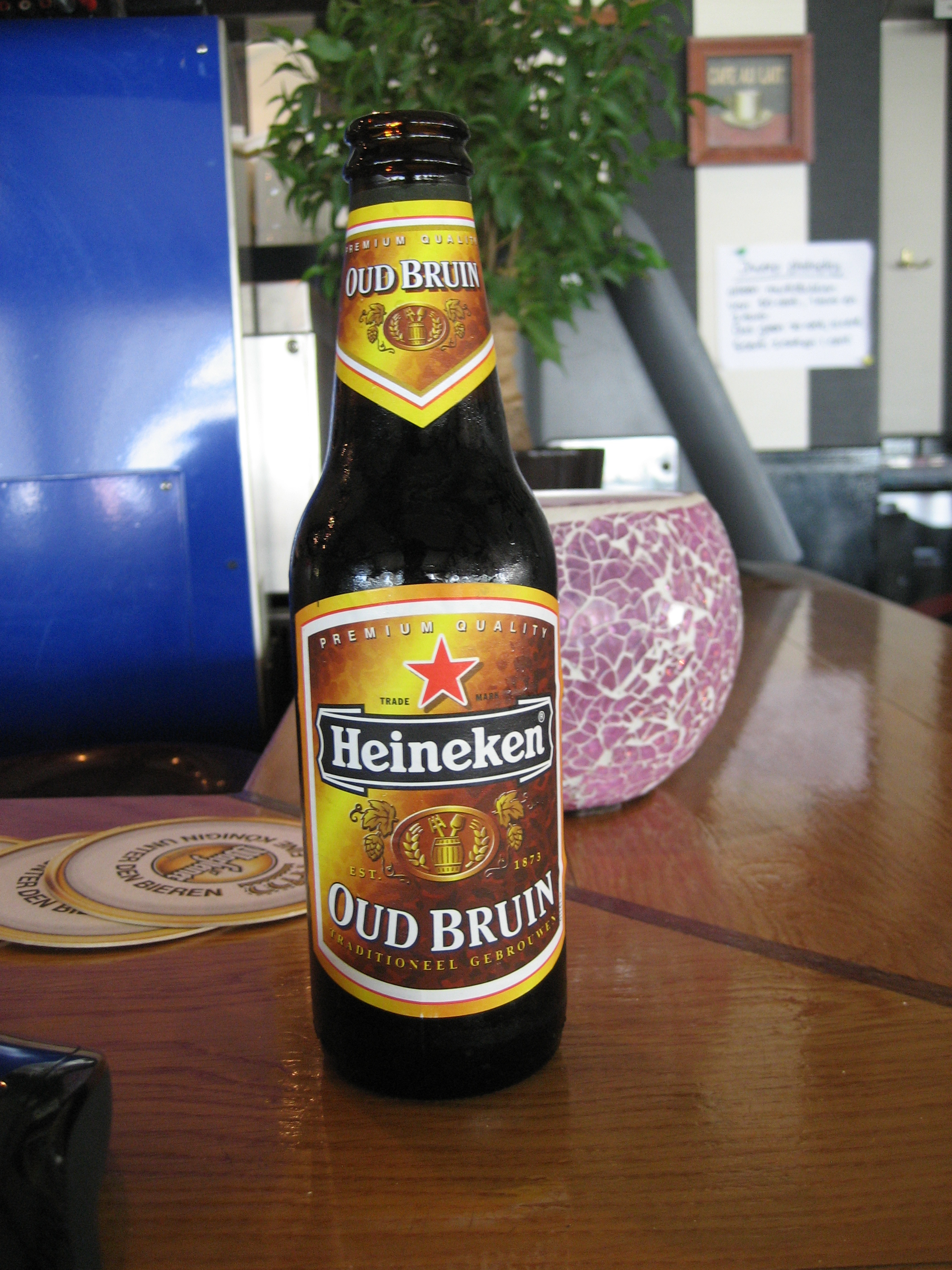
- Bottle of Heineken Oud Bruin
- Type: Beer
- Distributor: Heineken International
- Origin: Netherlands
- Alcohol by volume: 2.5 %
- Colour: 120 EBC (61 SRM)
- Style: Oud bruin
- Final gravity: 9–10 °P
- IBU scale: 14 IBU
- Related products: Heineken Lager Beer; Heineken Premium Light; Heineken Tarwebok

Heineken Oud Bruin (Dutch pronunciation: [ˈɦɛinəkən ʌut ˈbrœyn, -kə ʔʌut -]; English: Heineken Old Brown) is a Dutch-style oud bruin beer produced by the Dutch brewing company Heineken. It shares only the name with the stronger, more acidic oud bruin beers of Belgium, which are a different style. It is available only in the Netherlands

The beer is brewed from water, barley malt, and hops using top-fermentation. Its color is dark brown or 120 EBC and its taste is mildly sweet or 14 IBU. The brewer states that the beer derives its color and taste from the dark malt and hops, but the bottle label states caramel color is also added and the beer is sweetened with sugar.

Heineken Oud Bruin has 2.5% alcohol by volume (abv). In 1977, the abv of Heineken Oud Bruin was reduced from 3.5% to 2.5%. Generally, oud bruin beers in Netherlands have 2.5 to 3.5% abv, much lower than lagers with around 5% abv.

Other Dutch beer brands also have an oud bruin variety, such as Alfa Oud Bruin, Brand Oud Bruin, and Gulpener Oud Bruin.
