= IARD =

IARD may refer to:

- Immediate action rapid deployment, a law enforcement technique for responding to high-risk crises
- International Alliance for Responsible Drinking, a not-for-profit organization dedicated to promoting responsible drinking
- lnternational Animal Rights Day
