= Tru Blu Beverages =

Australian soft drink producer

- Industry: Beverage industry
- Founded: 2011
- Headquarters: Salisbury South, South Australia
- Owner: Refresco Australia (Kohlberg Kravis Roberts)

Tru Blu Beverages is an Australian soft drink producer. 1 in 6 beverages purchased by Australian consumers through supermarkets is made by Tru Blu Beverages. Employing 400 people nationally, they are an important manufacturer in the Australian business sector, and are the No. 3 non-alcoholic, non-dairy beverage manufacturer in Australia. The beverages are sold nationally through leading supermarkets (Coles, Woolworths, IGA), corner stores, petrol stations, and convenience outlets. The company has factories in 3 states and offices in each major capital city.

In 2011, Asahi Holdings (Australia) Pty Ltd acquired P&N Beverages Australia Pty Ltd, simultaneously divesting the cordial and carbonated soft drink business of P&N to the newly established Tru Blu Beverages Pty Ltd, and retained the water and fruit juice business of P&N. They produce over 20 brands of soft drink, cordial, sparkling mineral water and energy drinks. Some of the brands produced and sold by Tru Blu Beverages are:

LA ICE, LA Maxi ICE, Diet Rite, Tiger Ginger Beer, Glee, Capri, Waterfords Lite & Fruity, Wicked, Yankee Root Beer, McSars, Ceda Creaming Soda, Lido Lemonade, Juicee, Club Dry Ginger, Pub Squash, Brewers Choice Ginger Beer, and Passion Crush.

Woolworths

- Diet Rite Cordial: Apple Raspberry, Lime, Multi Fruits, Apple Blackcurrant, Fruit Cocktail, Lemon Lime 1L

Coles

- FruitCo: Orange +, Apple Pear +, Grape +, 10 Fruits +, Apple Mango Banana +, Apricot Nectar +, Apple +, Tomato + 2L
- Viva Cordial: Lime, Fruit Cup, Raspberry 2L
- Diet Rite Cordial: Apple Raspberry, Lemon, Strawberry Guava, Fruit Cocktail 1L

The head office is located in Condell Park, a suburb in Sydney, NSW.

== See also ==
- List of brand name soft drinks products
- List of soft drink flavors
- List of soft drinks by country
