= Stockwell (disambiguation) =

Stockwell is a district in inner South London, England.

Stockwell may also refer to:

== Places ==
- Stockwell (ward), an electoral ward of the Lambeth London Borough Council
- Stockwell, Indiana
- Stockwell, South Australia

== People ==
=== Surname ===
- Anthony Stockwell, British historian
- Chris Stockwell (1957–2018), Canadian politician
- Clifford H. Stockwell (1897–1987), Canadian geologist
- Dean Stockwell (1936–2021), American actor
- Frank Stockwell (1928–2009), Irish sportsperson
- Guy Stockwell (1934–2002), American actor
- Harry Stockwell (1902–1984), American actor
- Hugh Stockwell (1903–1986), British general
- Ian Stockwell (1917-1998), British air force officer
- John Stockwell (CIA officer) (born 1937), American spy and activist
- John Stockwell (actor) (born 1961), American actor and director
- Mark Stockwell (born 1963), Australian swimmer
- Mick Stockwell (born 1965), English football player
- Peter Stockwell, New Zealand air marshal

=== Given name ===
- Stockwell Day (born 1950), Canadian politician

== Fiction ==
- David Stockwell, fictional character in the television series Heartbeat
- Ernest Stockwell, fictional character in the video game Army of Two
- Hunt Stockwell, fictional character in the television series The A-Team
- Jim Stockwell, fictional character in the television series Queer as Folk

== Other uses ==
- Stockwell (horse) (1849–1871), British racehorse
- Stockwell, a code name (c. 1950 to 1955) for British Central Government War Headquarters
- Stockwell (company), an American company originally called "Bodega"
