= SunOpta =

Multi-national food and mineral company

SunOpta, Inc.
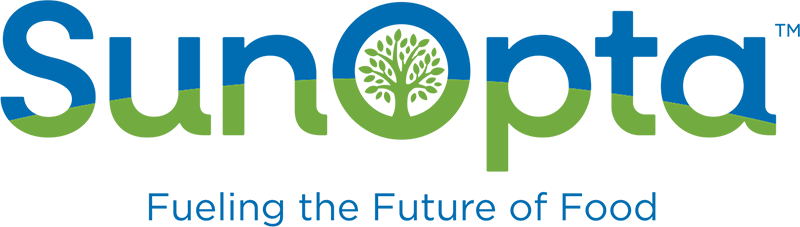
- Company type: Public
- Traded as: TSX: SOY; Nasdaq: STKL
- Industry: Organic food, Mineral
- Founded: 1973 as Stake Technology, changed name to SunOpta in 2003
- Headquarters: Eden Prairie, Minnesota, U.S.
- Key people: Brian W. Kocher (CEO)
- Number of employees: 1,200
- Website: sunopta.com

SunOpta, Inc. is a multi-national food and mineral company headquartered in Eden Prairie, Minnesota and founded in 1973 in Canada.

== Overview ==
SunOpta offers a wide array of plant-based products and fruit based snacks. These products include soy milk, almond milk, oat milk, tea, broths, and fruit-based snacks. The company produces shelf-stable beverages for retailers as well as branded food companies. The company specializes in sourcing, processing and packaging of natural and organic food products, integrated from seed through packaged products. The company’s core natural and organic food operations focus on grains and fruit based products.

In 2007, SunOpta Inc acquired the Dutch organic ingredients trader Tradin Organic.

It was announced on February 9, 2026 that the company would be sold to Refresco in a $1.1 billion dollar deal expected to close in the second quarter of 2026.
