= Gigil =

Philippine advertising agency

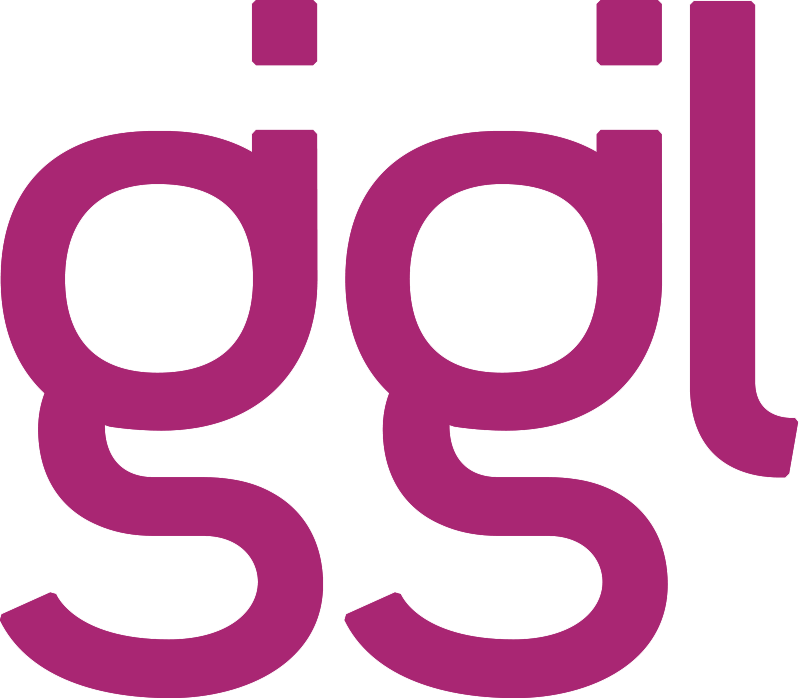
- Type: Advertising agency
- Industry: Advertising, marketing
- Founded: 2017; 9 years ago
- Founders: Badong Abesamis; Herbert Hernandez; Isabel Prollamante
- Headquarters: Taguig, Philippines
- Areas served: Philippines, Canada, United States, Cambodia
- Website: gigil.com.ph

Gigil (stylized as GIGIL) is a Philippine advertising agency based in Bonifacio Global City in Taguig, Philippines.

== Background ==
Gigil was founded by Badong Abesamis, Herbert Hernandez, and Isabel Prollamante. The group considered naming their agency "No Plan B" or "Toyo" but decided to adopt Abesamis' proposal "Gigil" to reflect the agency's vision of "passion" or hard work. Gigil was officially launched in October 2017.

After Prollamante left to move abroad, Gigil appointed Jake Yrastorza as Managing Partner.

Gigil has commissioned works for numerous brands such as 7-Eleven, AirAsia, Globe, Jollibee, Levi's, Netflix, Procter & Gamble, RC Cola, Unilever, and Vivo, among others.

In January 2023, Gigil announced its expansion to the United States and Canada by opening offices in Los Angeles, New York, and Toronto.

In September 2025, Gigil announced its expansion to Cambodia by opening an office in Phnom Penh.

== Notable campaigns ==
=== 2019 ===
Gigil's Shop2Give campaign won a gold award for Advocacy and a silver award for Responsible Citizenship at the 2019 Tambuli Awards and a bronze award for the E-commerce category at the 2019 ADFEST Awards. Within the same year, Gigil's Dr. Internet campaign in for Konsulta MD won a bronze award for the Healthcare category at the 2018 Spikes Asia Awards and a bronze award for the Digital Craft category at the 2018 Boomerang Awards. It also won two gold awards for Creative Storytelling and for Film Craft: Best Copywriting, and a bronze for Creative Effectiveness: Film at the 2019 Kidlat Awards.

Gigil's Studs campaign in 2019 for Levi's won a silver award for Fashion & Beauty at the 2019 Clio Awards. It also won a bronze award for Creative Effectiveness at the 2019 Kidlat Awards, two bronze awards for Brand Storytelling and Seasons Celebration at the Asia Pacific Tambuli Awards, two silver awards for Effectiveness at the 2019 Boomerang Awards, and a gold award for the Retail category at the 2020 Asia Pacific Effie Awards, making Gigil the first independent agency from the Philippines to win an Effie gold.

=== 2020 ===
Gigil's Basta campaaign in 2020 for RC Cola, which featured a boy confronting his mother if he is adopted due to glasses embedded on his back, won a bronze award for Film at the Cannes Lion 2021. It also won a bronze award at the 2021 Asia Pacific Effie Awards for the Youth Marketing category, a silver award at the 2022 Asia Pacific Effie Awards for the Beverages, Non-Alcohol category and the Short Video Marketing category, and a bronze award for Film at the 2022 Clio Awards.

=== 2021 ===
Gigil did a marketing campaign for the Netflix animated series Trese in 2021.

=== 2022 ===
Gigil's Party campaign in 2022 for Cheers, won a bronze award for Film at the Cannes Lions 2022. Gigil also won silver awards from the London International Awards (LIA) in 2022 for their Cheers Party and Orocan Pail campaigns.

The Clio Entertainment Awards awarded Gigil two silver awards for their Netflix Literal Money Heist and Netflix Jaywalking campaigns, and a bronze award for their Netflix Reel to Real campaign in 2022.

=== 2023 ===
Gigil turned the SM Mall of Asia Globe into a colossal basketball for Smart Communications, to promote its sponsorship of the 2023 FIBA Basketball World Cup happening in the Philippines. The campaign won a bronze in the Clio Sports Awards.

Gigil won a silver for its Delivery Man campaign for Grab under the New Product or Service – Line Extension category and a bronze for its Globe campaign under the Carpe Diem – Services category at the 2023 Asia Pacific Effie Awards.

Gigil won a silver in the Clio Entertainment Awards for a billboard campaign for Netflix's title Glass Onion in 2023. The agency also won another silver in the Clio Entertainment Awards for The KoolPals Thanks, Haters! NFT, in which online hate for the group was turned into money, in the same year.

=== 2024 ===
Gigil was handpicked by The ONE Asia Creative Awards of The One Show New York to conceptualize and execute its call-for-entries campaign in 2024.

Gigil won a gold for its 4Dish Pot campaign for Netflix under the Outdoor Lotus category. The same campaign also won a gold and a silver in the Clio Entertainment Awards in 2024.

Gigil's Summer campaign in 2024 for Grab, won a silver award for Film at the Cannes Lions 2024. The same campaign also won a silver and a crystal award in Korean advertising festival MAD STARS in 2024.

Gigil won in the Asia Pacific Effie Awards in 2024 for marketing effectiveness, winning a silver for TNT and a bronze for CoCo Tea. Gigil also grabbed 3rd Place, Independent Agency of the Year in the same show.

At the YouTube Works Awards in 2024, Gigil’s campaign for CoCo Tea entitled Cool was declared “Best of Country” and “Best Brand Story”. The agency’s campaign for Grab entitled Sorry was named winner in the categories “Big Bang” and “Masters of Media.” Another campaign for Grab entitled Valentine’s Day won in the “Best of Festive” category. The agency’s campaign for TNT entitled SIM Registration was the “Force for Good” category winner.

Gigil won a bronze in the London International Awards 2024 for the creative strategy of CoCo Tea Cool.

Gigil won a gold and a silver in the Clio Entertainment Awards in 2024 for Netflix 4Dish Pot in the Out of Home and Experiential & Activations categories respectively under Television and Streaming.

=== 2025 ===
Gigil won a gold for TNT SIM Registration Drive in the Effective Lotus category, silvers and a bronze for Grab Summer in the Digital and Social Lotus and Film Lotus categories, and a silver for Mandaue Foam Home Store Steal in the Film Lotus category at ADFEST 2025. Because of these, Gigil was named "Independent Agency of the Year".

Gigil won bronzes for Grab Summer and RC Cola Miracle in the film category at Spikes Asia 2025.

Gigil won a gold for RC Cola Miracle and a bronze for Mandaue Foam Home Store Steal in the film category of the Clio Awards in 2025.

The British D&AD Awards in the film category awarded Gigil a Graphite and a Wood for Mandaue Foam Home Store Steal. The show also awarded Gigil a Wood for RC Cola Miracle.

The Cannes Lions, also in the film category, honored Gigil with a Bronze for Mandaue Foam Home Store Steal and another Bronze for RC Cola Miracle.

The AWARD Awards presented Gigil with a Bronze in the strategy category for Defensil Germ Z and another Bronze in the film and entertainment category for Grab Summer.

The MAD STARS awarded Gigil a Gold in the Film Stars category for Mandaue Foam Home Store Steal. Gigil also received Silvers for the same Mandaue work, and for Lagundex The Best Endorser in the Viral Film, Pharma/Toiletries, and Cultural Insight subcategories respectively of the Film Stars category. Gigil also received Bronzes for the same Lagundex piece, and for Closeup Perspective Billboard in the Diverse Insights and Outdoor categories respectively.

The London International Awards gave Gigil a Silver for Mandaue Foam Home Store Steal in the Branded Content category. Gigil also received a Bronze for RC Cola Miracle in the Online Film category.

At the YouTube Works Awards, Gigil was declared Creative Agency of the Year, having won both in the Best of Philippines and Multiformat Storytelling categories for Grab Summer.

The Boomerang Awards named Gigil "Tech Innovator of the Year," and its work for Unilever Closeup Philippines Perspective Billboard as "Tech Innovation of the Year." The same piece also won Grand Prix and Gold in Media Excellence. Gigil's work for Jollibee called Joy Meter also won a Gold in Media Excellence, and another piece created by the agency--Mandaue Foam Home Store Steal--snatched The Black Boomerang.

The MMA Smarties APAC awarded Gold to Netflix There's No Stopping the Game: The Squid Game Returns, a piece Gigil contributed to with events the agency mounted in Manila.

On the other hand, The MMA Smarties Philippines declared Gigil "Independent Agency of the Year," having won Gold in the Instant Impact/Promotion category for Grab Lowered, Gold in the Short/Long-Form Video category for Grab Summer, and a third Gold in the Brand Experience category for Knorr Sinigang Raining in Manila campaign.

=== 2026 ===
Gigil won a Silver in the ADFEST for GrabMart Chicky in the Digital & Social category, Social Film Series. It also won a Bronze in the Film category, Web Series. Gigil also won two Bronzes for the Canva Pro Kween Yasmin campaign, both in the Digital & Social category (Organic Reach & Influence and Use of Influencer).

Spikes Asia awarded a Silver to Gigil for its Canva Pro work featuring Kween Yasmin in the Social & Creator category.

At the New York Festivals Advertising Awards, Gigil's Canva Pro work featuring Kween Yasmin won Silver in the Best Use of Social Media Influencer category and Bronze in the User-Generated Content subcategory. Gigil's GrabMart Chicky campaign, in addition, received a Bronze in the Made for Social Media, NYF'in Funny category.

At the WINA Festival, GIGL was awarded two Bronzes--one for Canva Pro Kween Yasmin in the Interactive category, and the other for Netflix Wednesday's Canal of Tears in the Outdoor category.

At the Gerety Awards, Gigil was awarded a Gold and a Bronze for its GrabMart Chicky online video in the Communication Cut and Humour Cut categories, respectively.

At the APAC Effie Awards, Gigil snatched a Gold for its social stunt in the Influencer category for Jiang Nan Hotpot chain restaurant, Imperial Kitchen Group Michelle Lyn. Gigil also won a Bronze in the Short Video category for its work for Stresstabs, Haleon Assemble.

At the MAD STARS, Gigil brought home a Gold for its viral Canva Pro Kween Yasmin social activation in the Brand Experience & Activation Stars category.

At the Marketech Advertising Awards Asia Pacific, Gigil won the following: Gold in the Best in Humor category for the Palawan Tindahang Butas campaign; Silver and Bronze in Best Use of Humor and Best Brand Storytelling categories respectively for Palawan 2nd Wallet; Silver and Bronze in the Best in YouTube Campaign and Best Use of Meta categories for Palawan Protektodo; and, a Bronze in the Best Use of Tiktok category for Palawan Gintong Milyonaryo.

At the YouTube Works Awards, Gigil brought home First Runner-Up honors in the Best in Festive category for its Grab Holiday campaign.

At the Marketing Interactive Marketing Excellence Awards Philippines, Gigil won a Gold for its Palawan Protektodo Sachet campaign in the Excellence in Financial Empowerment Marketing category.

At the Marketech Next Awards Philippines, Gigil was honored with two Golds: for Palawan Sachet in the Most Innovative Consumer Insights Marketing Campaign category, and for Palawan There Na in the Most Innovative Brand Awareness Campaign category.

At the London International Awards, Gigil was handed a Silver and Bronze for its Canva Pro Kween Yasmin campaign in the Digital and Creativity in PR categories, respectively.

At Smarties Philippines, Gigil won four Golds for Canva Pro Kween Yasmin, Netflix Kontrabida Academy, GrabMart Chicky and VitaKeratin Nasaan si Fyang in the Creator/Influencer/Celebrity Marketing, Omnichannel Marketing, Short or Long-Form Video and Partnership PR & Branded Content Excellence categories, respectively; and two Silvers for VitaKeratin Nasaan si Fyang and Grab Asenso, in the New Product and/or Service Launch/Relaunch and Brand Purpose/Activism categories, respectively. Gigil’s work Canva Pro Kween Yasmin also won the Jurors’ Choice Award of the Year.

== Controversies ==
In 2021, Gigil released the Pandemic Effect campaign for the Belo Medical Group. The ad featured a woman gaining weight, growing body hair, and getting acne while watching a stream of bad news amid the COVID-19 pandemic. The ad received negative reception, which led to the pull-out of the ad and a one-year suspension of Gigil's membership from The Association of Accredited Advertising Agencies of the Philippines. Gigil and the Belo Medical Group promptly issued an apology and vowed to be more sensitive and inclusive in their advertising practices moving forward.

In July 2024, the descendants of Gil Puyat filed a complaint against Gigil for their guerilla marketing stunt where they replaced the signage of Gil Puyat Avenue to Gil Tulog, a wordplay on puyat which also means sleepless in Tagalog, and tulog meaning sleep. The marketing tactic was for Wellspring's sleep supplements.

== Industry recognition ==
In 2023, the Philippine Daily Inquirer named Gigil the No. 2 Philippine Growth Champion, as it placed second among 25 Philippine companies that achieved the highest percentage growth in revenues between 2018 and 2021. The UK's Financial Times named Gigil as one of the High-Growth Companies in Asia Pacific. Gigil was the highest-placing ad agency on the list, making it the fastest-growing ad agency in the Asia-Pacific. Campaign Brief Asia named Gigil as the No. 1 ad agency in the Philippines, No. 2 in Asia, and No. 3 in the Asia-Pacific. Badong Abesamis and Herbert Hernandez were also declared the Philippines' Most Awarded Creative Directors. Gigil won the Philippines Independent Agency of the Year silver in the Southeast Asia Campaign Agency of the Year awards. Gigil was also awarded the Southeast Asia Agency Marketer Partnership of the Year bronze with Netflix.

In 2024, Gigil was awarded by the Philippine Marketing Association's Agora Awards as Marketing Agency of the Year. Gigil was also named for the second consecutive year as a Philippine Growth Champion by The Philippine Daily Inquirer and Statista, having achieved the highest percentage growth in revenue among Filipino companies between 2019 and 2022. Gigil was also named for the second consecutive year by the Financial Times as among Asia-Pacific's fastest growing businesses on its list of High-Growth Companies Asia-Pacific 2024. Australia-based Campaign Brief The Work ranked Gigil the No. 2 creative agency overall in the Asia Pacific region. The agency was ranked No. 1 in the Philippines.

In 2025, Campaign Brief The Work ranked Gigil the No. 1 creative agency overall in the Asia Pacific region. Gigil's founding partners Badong Abesamis and Herbert Hernandez were named by Campaign Brief Asia in its 2025 Creative Rankings as "Philippines' Most Awarded Creative Directors". Campaign Brief Asia also ranked Gigil as the No. 1 ad agency in the Philippines.

=== Awards and recognition ===
The following are honors Gigil has received as an advertising agency rather than for a specific campaign.

Accolades received by Gigil
Year	Award	Category	Ref.
2020	Campaign's Agency of the Year Awards	Philippines Independent Agency of the Year	
2020	Campaign's Agency of the Year Awards	Philippines Creative Agency of the Year	
2021	AdAge Small Agency Awards	International Small Agency of the Year	
2023	Association of Accredited Advertising Agencies of the Philippines (4As Philippines) Agency of the Year Awards	Independent Agency of the Year	
2023	Association of Accredited Advertising Agencies of the Philippines (4As Philippines) Agency of the Year Awards	Media Agency of the Year: Best in Media Creativity	
2023	Association of Accredited Advertising Agencies of the Philippines (4As Philippines) Agency of the Year Awards	Independent Agency of the Year for Best in Market Performance	
2023	Association of Accredited Advertising Agencies of the Philippines (4As Philippines) Agency of the Year Awards	Independent Agency of the Year for Best in Market Performance	
2023	Association of Accredited Advertising Agencies of the Philippines (4As Philippines) Agency of the Year Awards	Independent Agency of the Year for Best in Management of Business	
2023	Association of Accredited Advertising Agencies of the Philippines (4As Philippines) Agency of the Year Awards	Independent Agency of the Year for Best in Creative	
2023	Asia Pacific Effie Awards	Independent Agency of the Year – 2nd place	
2023	Boomerang Awards	Agency of the Year	
2023	Campaign Brief Asia Creative Rankings	Philippines Agency of the Year	
2024	Campaign Brief Asia Creative Rankings	Philippines Agency of the Year	
2025	ADFEST Thailand	Independent Agency of the Year	
2025	Campaign Brief Asia 'The Work' Hot List	No. 1 in Asia	
2025	Campaign Brief Asia 'The Work' Hot List	No. 1 in the Philippines	
2025	YouTube Works Awards	Philippines Creative Agency of the Year	
2025	Boomerang Awards	Agency of the Year	
2025	MMA Smarties Philippines	Independent Agency of the Year	
2025	Campaign's SEAsia Agency of the Year	Philippines Creative Agency of the Year	
2025	Campaign's SEAsia Agency of the Year	Philippines Independent Agency of the Year	
2025	Campaign Brief Asia Creative Rankings	Philippines Agency of the Year	
2026	The Business Manual CEO Awards 2026	For Gigil - Badong Abesamis, Herbert Hernandez and Jake Yrastorza	
	Campaign Brief Asia 'The Work' Hot List	No. 2 in Asia No. 1 in the Philippines	
	The Drum Indie 100 (The World's Top Independent Agencies)	No. 11 Worldwide	
	Asia Pacific Effie Awards	Independent Agency of the Year - Third Place	
	Smarties Philippines	Independent Agency of the Year	
