= Claud A. Hatcher =

American pharmacist, businessman, and inventor

Claud Adkins Hatcher
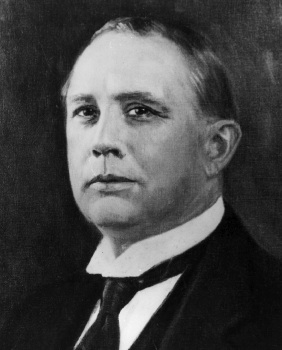
- Hatcher, c. 1917
- Born: August 20, 1876; Quitman County, Georgia, U.S.
- Died: December 31, 1933 (aged 57); Columbus, Georgia, U.S.
- Resting place: Riverdale Cemetery; Muscogee County, Georgia
- Education: University of Louisville School of Medicine
- Known for: Creating RC Cola

Claud Adkins Hatcher (August 20, 1876 – December 31, 1933) was an American pharmacist, businessman, and inventor from Columbus, Georgia, who is best known for creating RC Cola and other soft drinks.

== Background ==
Claud Adkins Hatcher was born on August 20, 1876, in Quitman County, Georgia, to Lucius Adkins Hatcher and Eleanor Moore King. Hatcher had originally intended to become a doctor, but he changed his studies after his first year in college and soon thereafter became a graduate pharmacist from the University of Louisville School of Medicine. By 1901, Hatcher had established himself as a successful pharmacist, operating two pharmacies in Preston, Georgia, and Dawson, Georgia. However, later that year, Hatcher left the pharmaceutical field to join his father, a wholesale grocer who had recently started a new wholesale grocery store in Columbus, Georgia. Founded as the Cole-Hatcher-Hampton Grocery Company, the company was soon renamed to the Hatcher Grocery Company after Claud and his father bought out the other investors in the company.

== Creating RC Cola ==
Created in 1886, Coca-Cola had grown immensely in popularity in the decades that followed, and the product was sold in great quantities at the Hatchers' grocery store. However, following a disagreement with the Columbus representative of the Coca-Cola Company over wholesale pricing, Hatcher stopped carrying the product in his store and began developing his own soft drink in a laboratory in the basement of the grocery store. In 1905, Hatcher introduced a ginger ale called Royal Crown Ginger Ale as an alternative to Coca-Cola. Shortly thereafter, Hatcher created Chero-Cola, a cherry cola designed to compete directly with Coca-Cola. Following a reformulation in 1934, Chero-Cola was renamed Royal Crown Cola, later shortened to just RC Cola.

Along with these two products, Hatcher developed a line of several other flavored sodas under the Royal Crown moniker. In 1905, Hatcher formed Union Bottling Works, a company to bottle these products. The company was renamed to the Chero-Cola Company in 1912. In 1924, the company introduced the Nehi line of fruit-flavored sodas, and the company was shortly thereafter renamed after this popular line.

== Later life ==
Hatcher died on December 31, 1933, at the age of 57 and was buried in the Riverdale Cemetery in Muscogee County, Georgia. His will established the Pickett & Hatcher Educational Fund, a non-profit student lender.
