= Heineken Tarwebok =

Dutch bock beer

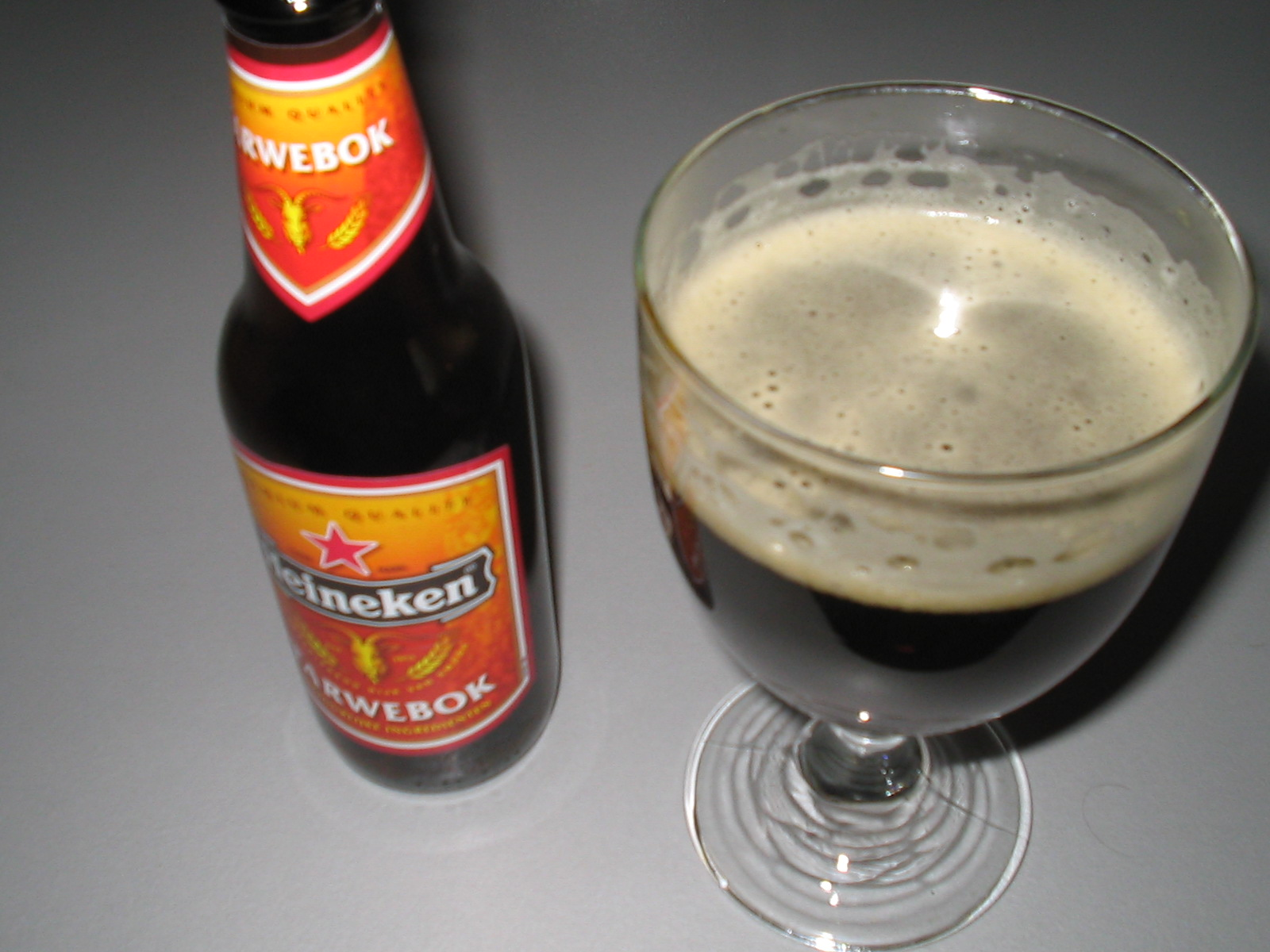
- Bottle and glass of Heineken Tarwebok
- Type: Beer
- Distributor: Heineken International
- Origin: Netherlands
- Alcohol by volume: 6.5 %
- Style: Bock
- Related products: Heineken Lager Beer; Heineken Oud Bruin; Heineken Premium Light

Heineken Tarwebok (Dutch pronunciation: [ˈɦɛinəkə(n) ˈtɑrʋəˌbɔk]; English: Heineken Wheat Bock) was a bock beer produced by the Dutch brewing company Heineken. The beer was made in the brewery in 's-Hertogenbosch in the Netherlands. In the fall of 2020, it was announced that Heineken Tarwebok was removed from the Heineken portfolio.
