= The Bottle, Alabama =

Unincorporated community in Alabama, United States

The Bottle
- Unincorporated community
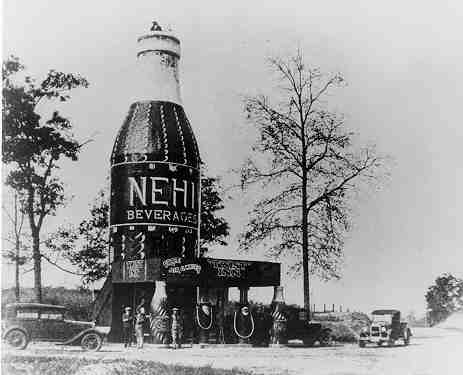
- A 1924 picture of "The Bottle"

- Location within Alabama Location within the United States
- Coordinates: 32°40′34″N 85°29′11″W
- Country: United States
- State: Alabama
- County: Lee
- Elevation: 761 ft (232 m)
- Time zone: UTC-6 (CST)
  - Summer (DST): UTC-6 (EDT)
- GNIS feature ID: 153675

The Bottle is a community located in the northern corporate limits of Auburn, Alabama, United States. The Bottle is located at the intersection of U.S. Highway 280 and the Alabama Highway 147, five miles (8.0 km) north of downtown Auburn, and adjacent to the Auburn University North Fisheries Research Complex.

The Bottle is located at 32°40′34″N 85°29′11″W at an elevation of 760 feet (230 m).

The Bottle is named for the bright orange wooden replica of a Nehi soda bottle which stood in the location from 1924 to 1936. It has frequently been noted on lists of unusual place names.

== History ==
Built in 1924, and billed as "the world's largest bottle", The Bottle (sometimes referred to as The "Nehi Inn") was built by John F. Williams, owner of the Nehi Bottling Company, in Opelika, Alabama. The Bottle stood 64 feet (20 m) tall, and measured forty-nine feet (15 m) in diameter at the base, and 16 feet (4.9 m) at the cap. The ground floor was a grocery store and service station. The second and third floors were living quarters and storage.

The neck of the Bottle had windows for use as an observation tower. The "bottle cap" was the roof. Inside there was a spiral oak stairway. The Bottle became a gathering place for tourists and locals alike to swap yarns and have parties every Friday night on the balcony above the service station.

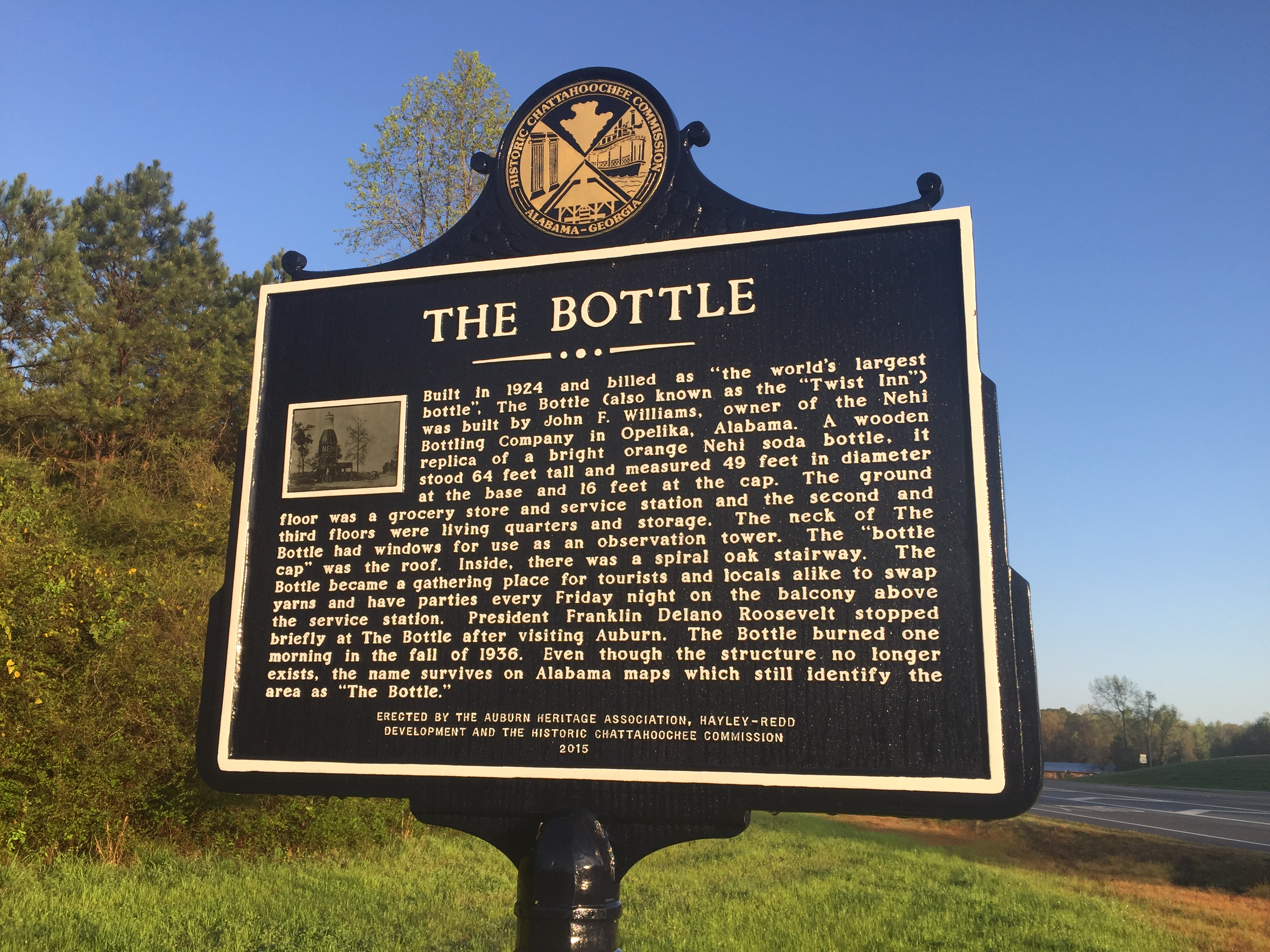
The Auburn Heritage Association held a historic marker dedication at the original location of "The Bottle" on April 25, 2015, at the corner of U.S. Highway 280 and Alabama Highway 147 (North College Street)

President Franklin Delano Roosevelt stopped briefly at The Bottle after visiting Auburn, as did Grand Ole Opry comedian Minnie Pearl.

In a 2001 account by W. A. "Arthur" Wood, The Bottle burned at 5:00 one morning in fall 1936. However, multiple contemporary newspapers claim The Bottle burned down in 1933, 1935, or 1937.

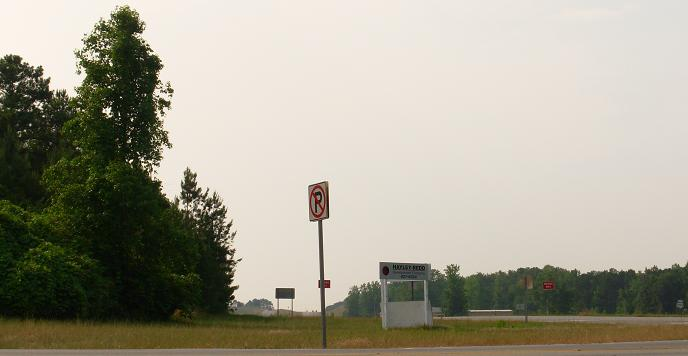
"The Bottle", 2006

Although the structure no longer exists, and the former location is only an empty lot, a historic plaque and a photograph mark the location, and Alabama maps still list the area as "The Bottle". The property was put on sale in 2005. The land was purchased in early 2006 by the Hayley Redd Development Company.

== See also ==
- Milk Bottle Grocery – Historic building in Oklahoma City
- Place names considered unusual

== Sources ==
- Logue, Mickey & Simms, Jack (1996). Auburn: A Pictorial History of the Loveliest Village, Revised. Auburn, Ala. ISBN 1-885860-08-0
