= Kick (soft drink) =

Soft drink

- Type: Citrus soft drink
- Manufacturer: Royal Crown Company
- Country of origin: United States
- Introduced: 1965
- Variants: none

Kick was a citrus-flavored soft drink product by Royal Crown Company, Inc. introduced to the market in 1965.

It was the year 1965 that Royal Crown Cola in Nashville and Johnson City Tennessee introduction of their Kick "like a Mule" brand. The carbonated citrus flavored soda with the infusion of caffeine.

Kick was developed to compete with more popular citrus soft drinks in North America, such as PepsiCo's Mountain Dew and Mello Yello by The Coca-Cola Company. It hoped to carve out a niche market in the extreme sports, punk and later video game subcultures.

Kick was discontinued in 2002 when Royal Crown was acquired by Cadbury Schweppes plc through its acquisition of Snapple.

As of 2023, Kick is being produced under the Old Towne Beverages label, bottled by Michigan Bottling in Detroit Michigan, and distributed by Garden Foods Distributor, Inc.

== See also ==
- List of defunct consumer brands
