= RC Cola =

American carbonated cola beverage

Royal Crown Cola
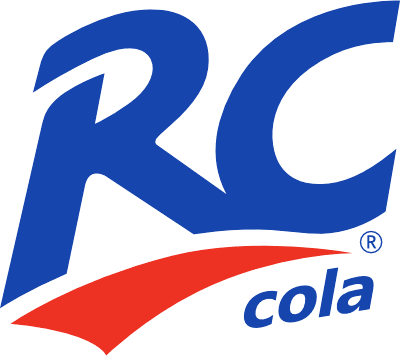
- Type: Cola
- Manufacturer: Keurig Dr Pepper (United States); RC Global Beverages (international)
- Distributor: Keurig Dr Pepper
- Origin: Columbus, Georgia, U.S.
- Introduced: 1905; 121 years ago
- Color: Caramel
- Flavor: Cola, Cherry Cola, Orange, Lemon Lime, Berries and Cream
- Variants: RC Cola; RC Zero Sugar; Royal Crown Cola; Mighty Rain; RC Q RC Refresher; Double Caffeine; Rad Rain; RC Neo; RC Flavor Collection; RC Cherry Cola; RC Diet Cola
- Website: rccolainternational.com

Royal Crown Cola (sold as RC Cola) is an American carbonated cola beverage made by Keurig Dr Pepper in the United States and by RC Global Beverages, Inc. in the rest of the world.

== History ==
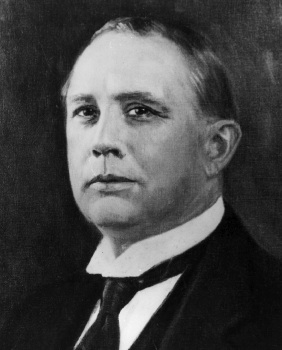
Claud A. Hatcher, the inventor of Royal Crown Cola

The Cole-Hampton-Hatcher Grocery Store was established in Columbus, Georgia in 1901. The Hatcher family took sole ownership and the name was changed to the Hatcher Grocery Store in 1903. The grocery store was located at what was 22 West 10th Street. Today's address (after house number changes) is 15 West 10th Street. At the same time, the popularity of bottled soft drinks rose rapidly, and grocery store owners wished to maximize their profit. As a grocery wholesaler, Claud A. Hatcher purchased a large volume of Coca-Cola syrup from the local company salesman, Columbus Roberts. Hatcher felt that the company deserved a special reduced price for the syrup since it purchased such large volumes. Roberts would not budge on the cost, and a bitter conflict between the two erupted. Hatcher told Roberts he would win the battle by never purchasing any more Coca-Cola, and was determined to develop his own soft drink formula. He started developing products in the basement of the store with a recipe for ginger ale.

Hatcher launched the Union Bottling Works in his family's grocery store. The first product in the Royal Crown line was Royal Crown Ginger Ale in 1905, followed by Royal Crown Strawberry, and Royal Crown Root Beer. Cherry-flavored Chero-Cola was introduced in 1907. The company was later renamed Chero-Cola in 1912. Its new fruit-flavored beverage, Nehi, was introduced in 1924; further, the company was renamed Nehi Corporation in 1928. Founder Claud A. Hatcher died in 1933 and Chero-Cola was reformulated in 1934 by chemist Rufus Kamm. The company reintroduced the "Royal Crown" to launch Royal Crown Cola, and went on to change its name from Nehi, Inc. to Royal Crown Cola Company in 1955.

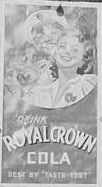
RC Cola Advertisement, 1943

Royal Crown Cola and Moon Pies were a popular "working man's lunch" in the American South in the 1950s. Royal Crown was the first company to sell soft drinks in a tin can in 1954; later, it was also the first company to sell soft drinks in an aluminum can. The company introduced the Diet Rite brand of dietetic beverages in 1954, with the cola variety being its flagship, however the product was dropped in 1969 after the sweetener cyclamate was banned. At the time it was the best selling diet soda, and accounted for about 25 per cent of Royal Crown sales and 30 per cent of its earnings. The product was reintroduced with a new formula and an advertising campaign designed to make people ask for Diet Rite because of its flavor instead of its lack of calories. The drink had climbed back to about 20 per cent of sales by 1971.

Royal Crown Cola Company developed their international presence during the 1970s, including countries in Asia and Europe. This included giving Tizer a licence to produce the drink within the United Kingdom. The Raffel family sold Arby's to the Royal Crown Cola Company for $18 million in 1976.

Caffeine- and sugar-free cola RC 100 was launched in April 1980. RC Cola accounted for approximately 4–5% of soft drink sales in the United States, behind Coke, Pepsi, Dr. Pepper, and 7 Up in 1984. Cherry RC would be introduced in July 1985, with Diet RC and its caffeine-free counterpart being announced that December, to debut in January 1986.

== Ownership changes ==
Royal Crown Cola Company was purchased by Triarc Companies, Inc. adding approximately $25 million a year to the marketing budget in 1993. The company was acquired by Cadbury Schweppes (which owned Dr Pepper) through its acquisition of Triarc's beverages business (which also included Snapple) in 2000. Cadbury Schweppes' US-based beverage business (including RC) was spun off as "Dr Pepper Snapple Group (DPSG)" in 2008. DPSG merged with Keurig Green Mountain in 2018 as Keurig Dr Pepper, the current owners of the RC Cola brand.

All non-US businesses were sold to Cott Beverages of Canada in 2001 and operated as Royal Crown Cola International. Cott sold Royal Crown Cola International to Refresco for US$50 million in 2021. Simultaneously, Refresco sold to Royal Crown Cola International to RC Global Beverages Inc.

In the Philippines, RC Cola was manufactured and distributed by Cosmos Bottling Corporation under a licensing agreement until 2001, RFM Corporation sold Cosmos to Coca-Cola Bottlers Philippines Corp. and San Miguel Corporation ending the license agreement in that year. During its production under Cosmos, RC Cola was only sold in some Visayan markets.

Philippine-based Macay Holdings announced in 2022 it would acquire all of RC Global Beverages Inc., subject to the finalization of a share purchase agreement and other closing conditions. The transaction was completed on January 17, 2023 for approximately $47 million, comprising a $21.4 million cash payment for equity and the assumption of approximately $26 million of obligations.

== Brand portfolio ==
Name	Year	Notes
RC Ginger Ale	1905	A ginger ale
RC Strawberry	1907	A strawberry-flavored drink
RC Root Beer	1907	A root beer
Chero-Cola	1910	A cherry-flavored cola
Nehi	1924	A range of drinks ultimately including Nehi Orange, Nehi Grape, Nehi Peach, Dr. Nehi, Nehi Chocolate, Nehi Root Beer, Nehi Lemonade, Nehi Wild Red, Nehi Blue Cream, Nehi Berks County Root Beer, Nehi Strawberry, Nehi Ginger Ale, Nehi Fruit Punch, Nehi Pink Lemonade and Nehi Blueberry
RC Cola	1934	The original RC Cola
Diet Rite	1954	Introduced as a line of flavored dietetic beverages in 1954. Its cola variety (the first diet cola on the market) gained popularity after a wider introduction of the beverage in 1962.
Kick	1965	A citrus soft drink, competitor to Mountain Dew. It was discontinued in 2002, and has since been revived.
RC Cola with a Twist	1969	RC Cola with lemon flavoring, discontinued in 1971.
Sugar Free (Diet) RC Cola	1971	The first low-calorie RC-branded drink, discontinued by 1975.
RC Cola 100	1980	A sugarless, caffeine-free variety of RC Cola. It was renamed RC Cola 100 Sugar-Free in 1982, with sugar being added to the regular variety of RC Cola 100.
Decaffeinated RC Cola	1982	Caffeine-free RC Cola, similar to the reformulated RC Cola 100. Discontinued by 1985.
Cherry RC Cola	1985	Cherry-flavored RC cola.
Diet RC Cola / RC Cola Zero Sugar	1986	Diet RC Cola, akin to Diet Rite. Originally contained NutraSweet. Renamed RC Cola Zero Sugar in 2024.
RC Draft Cola	1995	A "premium" cola made with cane sugar, discontinued in 1997.
RC Edge	1999	A cola with extra caffeine, produced until around 2004.
RC Cola Zero/RC Cola Free	2009	A no-calorie, no-sugar RC Cola, produced internationally. In other countries, it is also known as RC Cola Free. In some countries, it is sweetened with Splenda.
RC Cola Kick	2010	RC Cola with guarana.
Jeera	2012	A soda with a taste of cumin, crafted especially for south-central Asian markets.
RC Dra-Cola	2012	A sugar-free, red-colored cola introduced to the British market as a special edition for Halloween 2012; it featured a glow-in-the-dark label.
RC Cola Ten	2012	A low-calorie version of the cola made as part of Dr Pepper/7Up "Ten" line
Diet RC Cola Lemon	2016	A diet cola with lemon flavor
Diet Cherry RC Cola	2016	A diet cola with cherry flavor
Royal Crown Cola Classic/Slim	2018	Rebranded
RC Cola Double Caffeine	2022	RC Cola infused with double the amount of caffeine.
RC Flavor Collection	2023	New flavor collection including vanilla, lime, apple, coffee, marshmallow and winter spice.
RC Cola Berries and Cream	2023	A limited time flavor that mixes cola with berries and cream

== Advertising campaigns ==
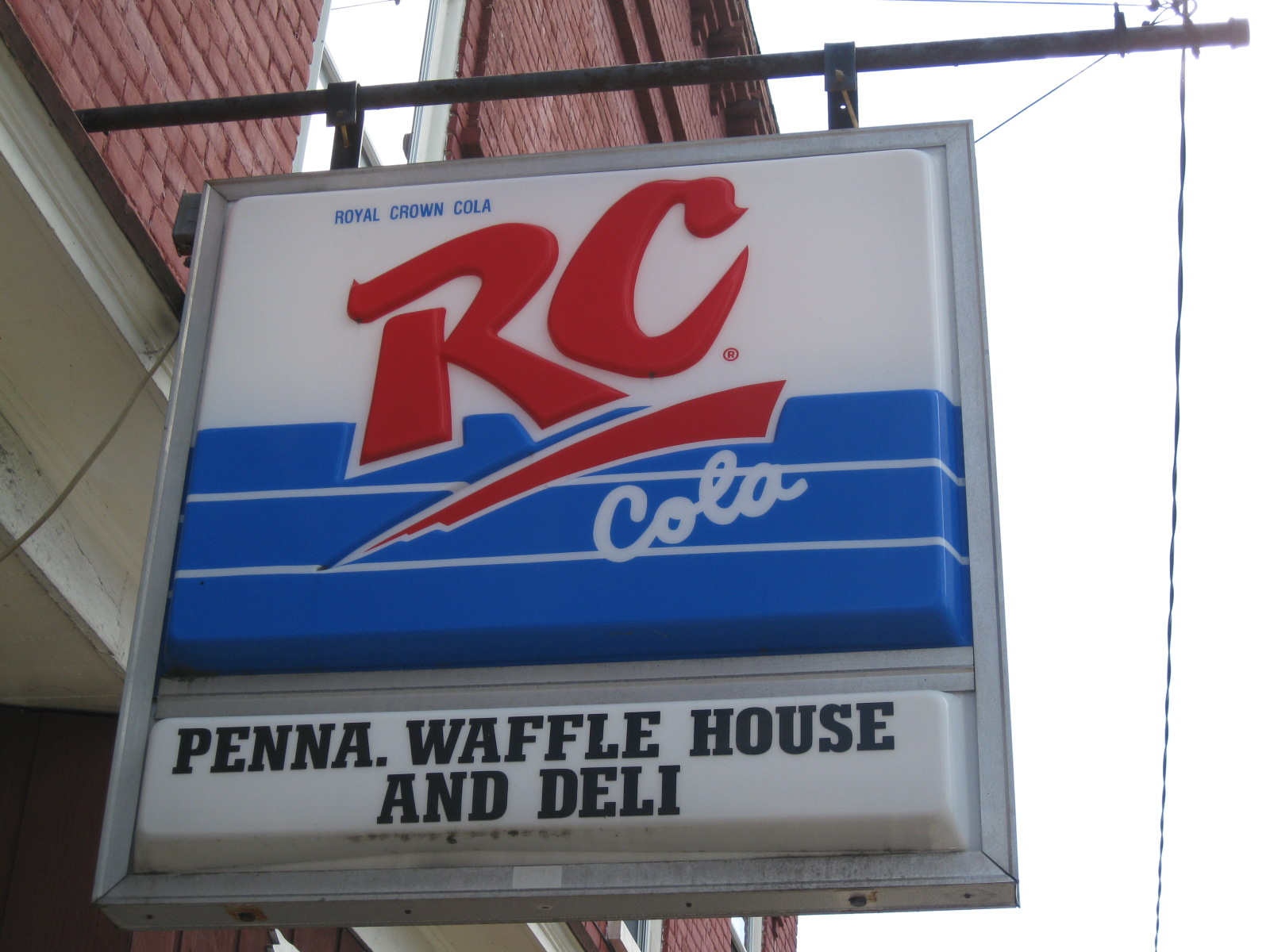
A sign in Jersey Shore, Pennsylvania

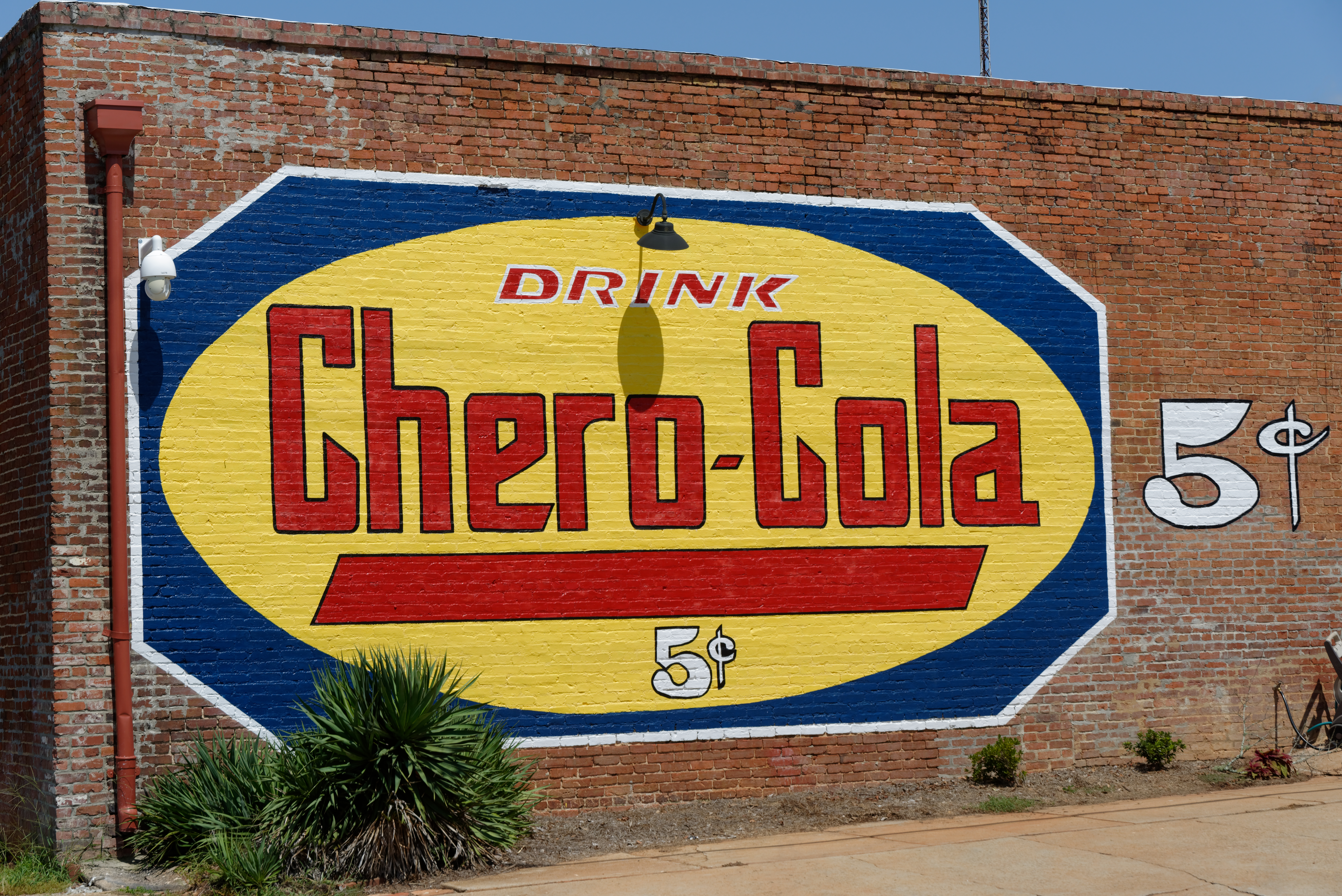
Chero-Cola advertisement

The RC Cola brand has been marketed through many campaigns. In the 1930s, Alex Osborn, with BBDO, made an ad campaign, including the slogan "The season's best."

In 1940, a publicity campaign was run, which saw Hollywood celebrities, next to the slogan "Best By Taste Test". Actress Lizabeth Scott as the face, next to the slogan "RC tastes best, says Lizabeth Scott".

In 1966, Royal Crown Cola collaborated with Jim Henson on an ad campaign for Royal Crown Cola which featured two birds called Sour Bird (performed by Jim Henson) and Nutty Bird (performed by Henson and assisted by Frank Oz) to promote the drinks. Nutty Bird would promote Royal Crown Cola by touting its benefits. The puppet for Nutty Bird was designed by Jim Henson and built by Don Sahlin. Sour Bird appeared on The Ed Sullivan Show with the Rock and Roll Monster.

Nancy Sinatra was featured in two Royal Crown Cola commercials in her one-hour TV special, Movin' With Nancy, which featured various singers and David Winters choreography in December 1967. She sang, "It's a mad, mad, mad Cola...RC the one with the mad, mad taste!...RC!" The company was the official sponsor of New York Mets on and off at times from the team's inception in 1962 until the early 1990s. A television commercial in the New York area featured Tom Seaver, New York Mets pitcher, and his wife, Nancy, dancing on top of a dugout at Shea Stadium and singing the tune from the Sinatra campaign.

RC sponsored two Porsche 917/10 Can-Am race cars during the 1972–73 season. In the mid-1970s, Royal Crown ran the "Me & My RC" advertisements. Others featured people in scenic outdoor locations. Louise Mandrell sang the jingle "Me and my RC / Me and my RC /'Cause what's good enough / For other folks / Ain't good enough for Me and My RC..."

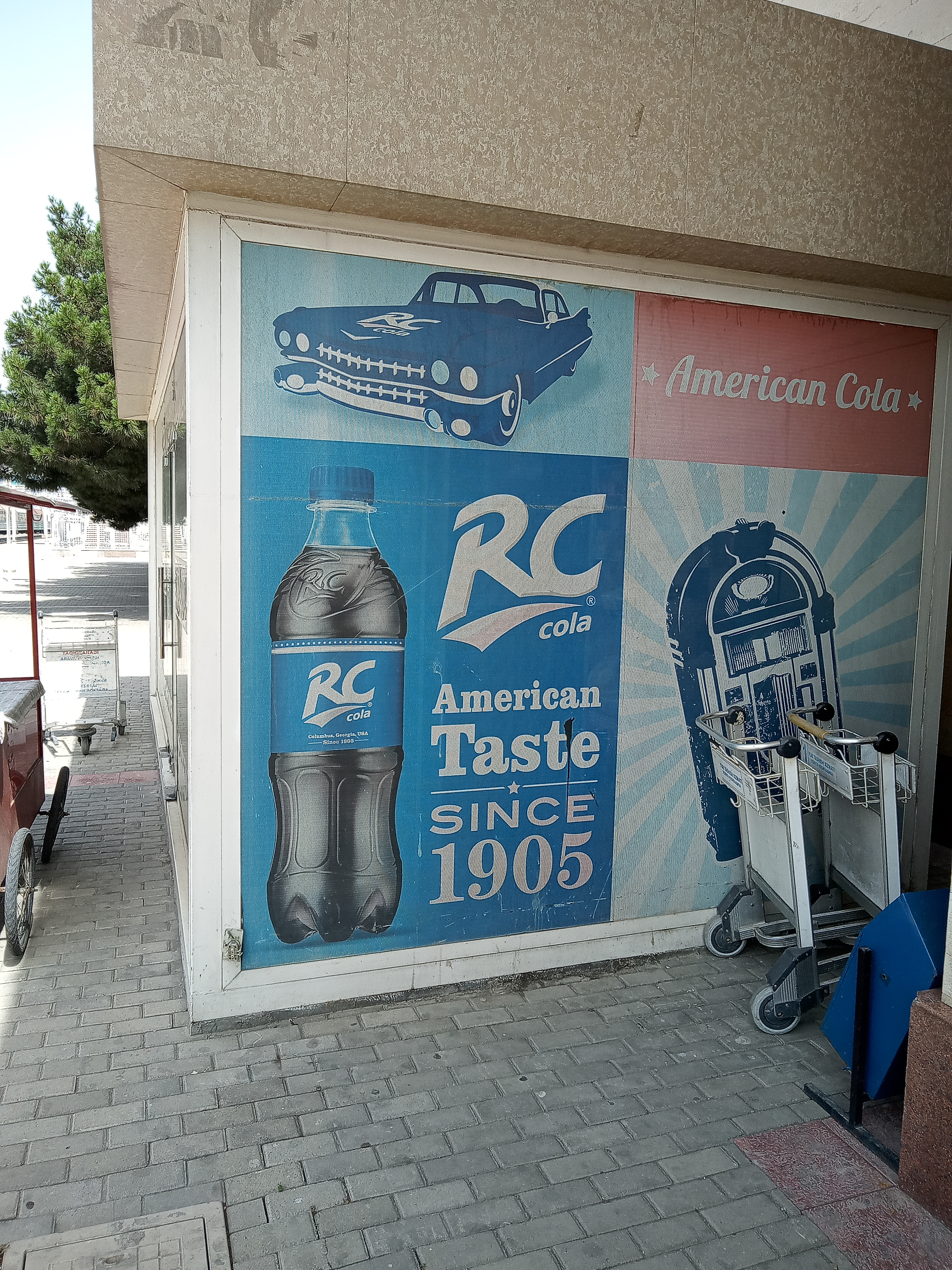
An ad for RC Cola in Margilan, Uzbekistan

RC was introduced to Israel in 1995 with the slogan "RC: Just like in America!" During the Cola Wars of the 1980s, RC used the 'Decide for yourself' campaign and would remind people 'There's more to your life than Coke and Pepsi."

In the Philippines, RC Cola released advertisements with artists popular in the country. In 2009, these had Maja Salvador and Kim Bum as celebrity endorsers. The Philippine marketing of the brand also painted the front of sari-sari stores with slogans like "RC ng (insert municipality/city)" (RC of my [town/city]). In 2019, the advertisements tapped Joshua Garcia to be the year's celebrity endorser and launched the "RC ng Bayan" campaign. In 2020, RC Cola had a campaign Basta, which featured a boy confronting his mother if he is adopted due to glasses embedded on his back. This campaign led to numerous awards such as a bronze award for Film at the Cannes Lion 2021, a bronze award at the 2021 Asia Pacific Effie Awards for the Youth Marketing category, a silver award at the 2022 Asia Pacific Effie Awards for the Beverages, Non-Alcohol category and the Short Video Marketing category, and a bronze award for Film at the 2022 Clio Awards.

Andretti Autosport driver Marco Andretti had RC Cola as his primary sponsor during the 2012 and 2013 IndyCar Series.

In 2022, RC Cola launched its WHY NOT? campaign, featuring three adults who upon taking a sip of RC Cola, would be transported to a world filled with endless imagination.
