= Bodega (disambiguation) =

A bodega is a small owner-operated convenience store.

Bodega may also refer to:

== Buildings ==
- Convenience store
- Warehouse
- Winery
- Wine bar
- Wine cellar

== Music ==
- Bodega (Scottish band)
- Bodega (Canadian band)
- Bodega (American band)
- Bodega (bagpipe), an instrument from southern France
- Bodega Band, a Norwegian jazz orchestra

== Places in the United States ==
- Bodega, California, a town in Sonoma County
- Bodega Bay, California, a town in Sonoma County
- Bodega Bay, a Pacific Ocean inlet on the northern California coast

== Other uses ==
- Bodega (company), former name of Stockwell, an American vending machine manufacturer
