= Heineken Premium Light =

Brand of light beer

Heineken Light
- Type: Light beer
- Manufacturer: Heineken
- Introduced: 2005
- Alcohol by volume: 3.30%
- Style: Pale lager
- Related products: Heineken Lager Beer; Heineken Oud Bruin; Heineken Tarwebok

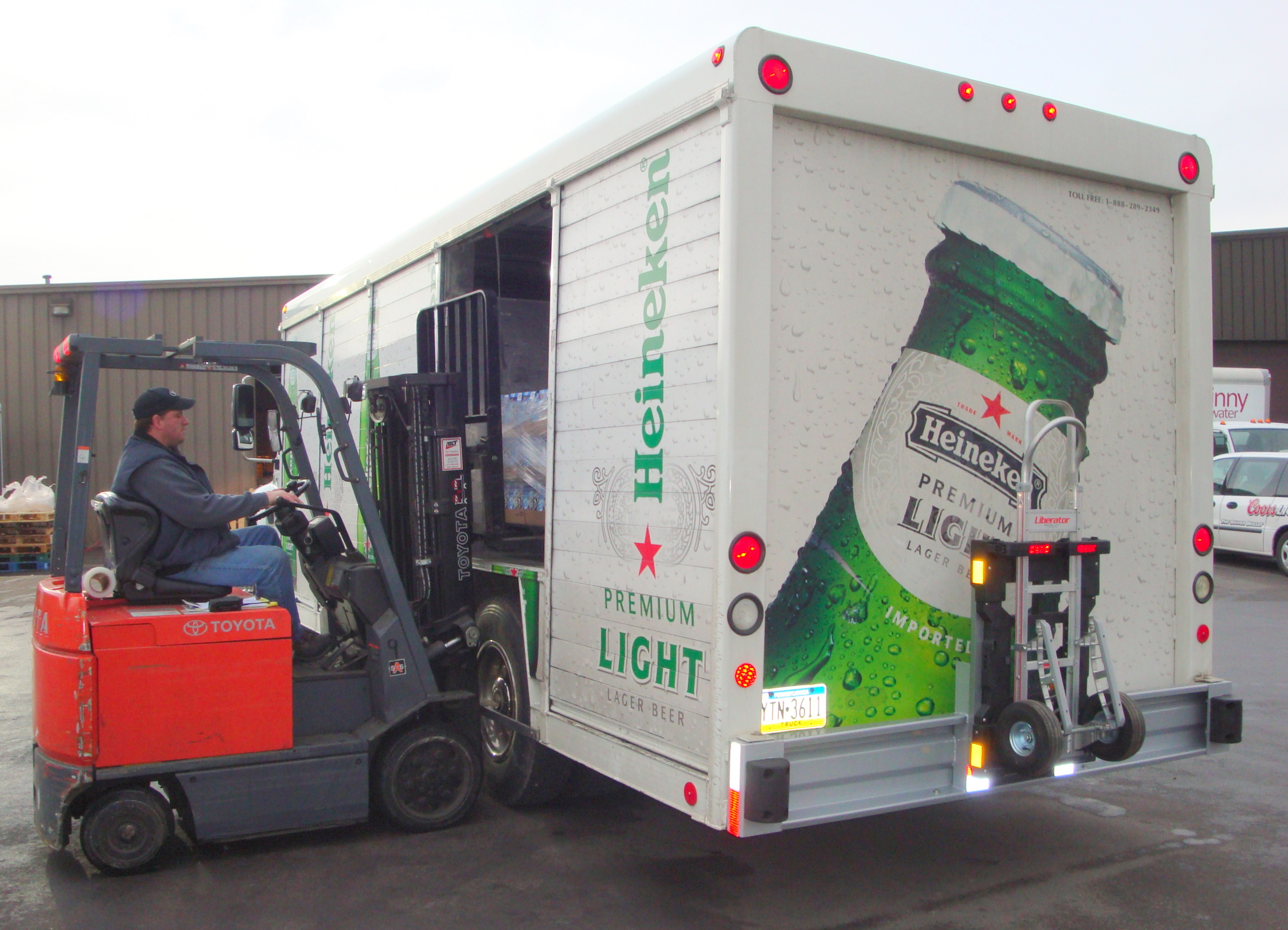
A truck advertising Heineken Light

Heineken Light (labelled as Heineken 3 in Australia) is a light beer brewed by Heineken for the United States market. It was introduced in 2005. Heineken light reportedly has: 90 calories per 12 oz. bottle and 6.8 grams of carbohydrates. The beer has fewer calories, less carbohydrate, and less alcohol than lager beers such as the Heineken Pilsener. The beer has 3.3% alcohol by volume.

== Launch ==
Heineken started to develop Heineken Premium Light in 2004. The beer was successfully brought on the market in Phoenix, Dallas, Providence, and Tampa in 2005. On 1 March 2006 Heineken Premium Light was launched in all the states of the USA. With 68 million litres of Heineken Premium Light in 2006, the first year exceeded the estimated 40 million litres. For 2007, the estimates are over 100 million litres. Heineken mentioned in the 2006 annual report: "The launch of this first true brand extension was the most important innovation in the actual beer since the Heineken brand was born in 1873."

American sales of the beer, however, declined between 2007 and 2012, with 440,000 barrels (52.5 million litres) sold in America in 2012, according to a report by Beer Marketer's Insights and published by USA Today on December 9, 2013.
