= Standard Reference Method =

Method to specify beer color

The Standard Reference Method or SRM is one of several systems modern brewers use to specify beer color. Determination of the SRM value involves measuring the attenuation of light of a particular wavelength (430 nm) in passing through 1 cm of the beer, expressing the attenuation as an absorption and scaling the absorption by a constant (12.7 for SRM; 25 for EBC).

The SRM (or EBC) number represents a single point in the absorption spectrum of beer. As such it cannot convey full color information which would require 81 points, but it does remarkably well in this regard (it conveys 92% of spectral information) even when fruit beers are considered.

Auxiliary "deviation coefficients" (see Augmented SRM below) can pick up the remainder and are necessary for fruit beers and when subtle color differences in malt beers are to be characterized.

== Measurement method ==
The ASBC and EBC measurements are now identical (both done at the same wavelength and in the same size cuvette) but the scaling is different.

A photometer or spectrophotometer is used to measure the attenuation of deep blue (violet) light at 430 nm, as it passes through 1 cm of beer contained in a standard 1 cm by 1 cm cuvette. The absorption is the log of the ratio of the intensity of the light beam entering the sample to the intensity leaving. This difference is multiplied by 12.7 in the SRM system and 25 in the EBC (see below).

For example, if the light intensity leaving is one one-hundredth the light intensity entering the ratio is 100, the absorption is 2 and the SRM is 25.4. The scale factor derives from the original definition of SRM discussed in the next paragraph.

The SRM number was originally, and still is, defined by "Beer color intensity on a sample free of turbidity and having the spectral characteristics of an average beer is 10 times the absorbance of the beer measured in a 1/2-inch cell with monochromatic light at 430 nanometers."^{[1]} Modern spectrophotometers use 1 cm cuvettes rather than 1/2 inch ones. When a 1 cm cuvette is used, application of the Bouguer–Beer–Lambert law shows that the multiplier should be 12.7 rather than 10. When the SRM value for a beer or wort is larger than about 30 the log linear limit of some instruments using 1 cm cuvettes is approached. In such cases the sample is diluted with deionized water. Using Beer–Lambert again gives the mathematical definition of SRM in the general case as:

$$SRM=12.7\times D \times A_{430}$$

where $D$ is the dilution factor ($D=1$ for undiluted samples, $D=2$ for 1:1 dilution etc.) and $A_{430}$ the absorbance at 430 nm in 1 cm.

The 430-nanometer wavelength corresponds to a deep blue (violet) light, and was chosen, as was the multiplier, to make values determined in the SRM system comparable to those determined using the Lovibond system in use at the time the SRM was adopted.

The SRM was adopted in 1950 by the American Society of Brewing Chemists which had recognized the need for an instrument based measurement of color unburdened by the difficulties of the Lovibond system which relies (it is still in use in many industries including brewing – malts are often labeled with the Lovibond color of laboratory worts prepared from them) on visual comparison of the sample to tinted glass discs. Beer colors measured in SRM and degrees Lovibond were, as noted above, approximately equal at the time of adoption of the SRM. However, modern analytical methods show that SRM and Lovibond diverge for darker colors. Comparison of EBC and Lovibond data published by modern maltsters shows that the relationship between SRM and Lovibond (ºL) is:

$$SRM = 1.3546 \times {^\circ L} - 0.76$$.

== EBC ==
The EBC system of color measurement is similar to the SRM. Measurements are taken at 430 nm in a 1 cm cell but the unit of color is 25 times the dilution factor times A_{430} as opposed to 12.7 times the dilution factor times A_{430} so that

$$\mbox{EBC} = \mbox{SRM} \times 1.97$$
$$\mbox{SRM} = \mbox{EBC} \times .508$$

Thus EBC is approximately twice SRM and this applies at any color depth. The agreement between SRM and Lovibond is fair for pale beers (10 °L ~ 12.7 SRM) but worsens for darker beers or worts (40 °L ~ 53.4 SRM).

Both systems demand that the beer be free of turbidity prior to the measurement at 430 nm. In the SRM a second measurement is taken at 700 nm. If the absorption at this wavelength is less than 0.039 (this number comes from ^{[2]}) times the absorption at 430 nm the beer is considered turbidity free. If not, it is to be filtered or centrifuged and the reading repeated. If the ratio test is not passed after clarification then the beer does not have "average spectral characteristics" and, technically, is not qualified to be characterized by the SRM method. The augmented SRM method described below removes this difficulty.

In the EBC system the beer is required to be filtered if its turbidity is more than 1 EBC turbidity unit (equivalent to 1 FTU). No absorption measurement is made other than at 430 nm. (the turbidimeter measures scattering at 650 nm).

Note that an earlier version of EBC color was based on absorption at 530 nanometers, which permitted no direct conversion between the two systems. However, if one assumes a linear log absorption spectrum (the Linner hypothesis from the realm of caramel color), and knows the Linner Hue Index, $H_L$, the absorptions are related by:

$$A_{430} = A_{530} \times 10^{H_{L}/10}$$

A formula for converting between the old EBC color value and SRM sometimes continues to appear in literature. It should not be used, as it is flawed and based on measurements which are no longer taken.

Part of the problem with this formula is that beer spectra are not log linear. The absorption of 1 cm of a beer with "average spectral characteristics" (average here means the average of the absorption spectra of the ensemble of 99 beers as described in^{[7]}) at wavelength $\lambda$ is well described by

$$A(\lambda) = {SRM\over 12.7}(0.018747e^{-{(\lambda - 430)\over 13.374}} + 0.98226e^{-{(\lambda - 430)\over 80.514}})$$

While it is clear that one could use this formula to compute A_{530} from the SRM measured at 430 nm and thus interconvert between SRM and old EBC this is not where its value lies. Because it represents, at least approximately, the full absorption spectrum of the beer it can be used to calculate the tristimulus color (three color coordinates in a chosen color space which describes the color an observer actually sees) of a beer of known SRM by following the prescription of ASTM E-308.

== Tristimulus color ==
There has been interest in tristimulus reporting in the brewing community in recent years and the ASBC has an approved Method of Analysis [MOA] for tristimulus characterization. The absorption of the sample is measured in 1 cm at 81 wavelengths separated by 5 nm starting at 380 nm and extending to 780 nm. These are converted to transmission values (by taking the antilogarithm of each absorption) and inserting the results into ASTM E-308. The reported tristimulus values are in L^{*}a^{*}b^{*} color space and describe what is seen under Illuminant C (daylight) by a 10° observer when the path is 1 cm. The choice of path, illuminant, observer and color space does not represent a limitation of E-308 but rather the ASBC's need to standardize reporting.

If we are given only the SRM value for a beer we can compute the approximate transmission spectrum if the beer has average spectral characteristics simply by taking the antilog of $A(\lambda)$:

$$T(\lambda) = log^{-1}(-{SRM\over 12.7}(0.018747e^{-{(\lambda - 430)\over 13.374}} + 0.98226e^{-{(\lambda - 430)\over 80.514}}))$$

This can be used with E-308 to calculate tristimulus color in any path, for any illuminant, for either observer in any colorspace derivable from CIE XYZ space. This formula could, for example, be used to compute color patches to be printed on transparency or card stock for use in evaluating the SRM of actual beers but color swatches prepared in this way are only valid for the illuminant, observer and path used in the E-308 calculation. The BJCP color guide was prepared in this way. This illustrates that the SRM does convey full color information if the beer has average spectral characteristics. If it does not then we need more information than just the SRM provides.

== Augmented SRM ==
Recent research has shown that the transmission spectrum of a beer (with no restriction on its spectral characteristics) can be represented by:

$T(\lambda) = log^{-1}(-{SRM\over 12.7}(0.018747e^{-{(\lambda - 430)\over 13.374}} + 0.98226e^{-{(\lambda - 430)\over 80.514}} +c_1 \xi_1 + c_2 \xi_2 + ...))$

where the $\xi_i$ are eigenvectors of the covariance matrix of the normalized transmission spectra of the ensemble of beers from which the average normalized spectrum (the sum of the two exponential terms in parentheses in the $A(\lambda)$ formula) was determined and $c_1$, $c_2$ etc. are obtained as the dot products of the eigenvectors with the normalized transmission spectrum of the beer being characterized. This formula is identical to the one given previously with the exception that it has been augmented by the $c_i$ coefficients which encode the deviation of the sample normalized spectrum from the average normalized spectrum. Where the sample beer has a normalized spectrum close to the average the c's are small and it is remarkable how often this is the case. Typically one or two augmentation coefficients are sufficient and they are frequently small enough that one or more can be neglected. For example, an imported ale with SRM equal to 6.8 has coefficients -0.07 and -0.1. Using both these coefficients one obtains color accuracy of less than one L^{*}a^{*}b^{*} space unit (the limit of perception) in up to a 10 cm path under Illuminant C. Using just the SRM for this beer gives a reasonably good description of its color with error of about 4 L^{*}a^{*}b^{*} units. Beers which deviate dramatically from the "average" spectrum are easily accommodated. Thus a sample of Kriek Lambic (Belgian cherry beer), has an SRM of 15.27. Were its color to be reconstructed from just the SRM it would be the color of an "average" beer which will be dark amber – not the red of a Kriek. Including 3 coeffiecents (1.8, 0.8 and -0.1) yields color accuracy of less than 1 L^{*}a^{*}b^{*} unit in paths up to 8 cm again under Illuminant C.

Augmented SRM is advantageous relative to the ASBC tristimulus method in that color under any viewing circumstances can be computed in addition to which the familiar SRM rating is retained. Because of metamerism one cannot, in the general case of non zero deviation coefficients, estimate the original spectrum from the L^{*}a^{*}b^{*} values reported by the ASBC method.

== Color based on Standard Reference Method (SRM) ==
Color based on Standard Reference Method (SRM)
SRM/Lovibond	Example	Beer color	EBC
2	Pale lager, Witbier, Pilsener, Berliner Weisse		4
3	Maibock, Blonde Ale		6
4	Weissbier		8
6	American Pale Ale, India Pale Ale		12
8	Weissbier, Saison		16
10	English Bitter, ESB		20
13	Bière de Garde, Double IPA		26
17	Dark lager, Vienna lager, Märzen, Amber Ale		33
20	Brown Ale, Bock, Dunkel, Dunkelweizen		39
24	Irish Dry Stout, Doppelbock, Porter		47
29	Stout		57
35	Foreign Stout, Baltic Porter		69
40+	Imperial Stout		79
