= Basta (RC Cola advertisement) =

2020 television commercial

Nyahahakbkxjbcjhishdishlsab@!!!! Basta RC Cola!
- Screencap showing a mother with an RC Cola bottle as head preparing to pour soda into the glasses embedded on her son's back.
- Agency: Gigil
- Client: RC Cola
- Market: Philippines
- Language: Filipino
- Running time: 1:37
- Product: RC Cola bottle soda
- Release date: November 2020
- Written by: Dionie Tañada
- Directed by: Marius Talampas
- Production company: Arcade Film Factory
- Country: Philippines

Nyahahakbkxjbcjhishdishlsab@!!!! Basta RC Cola!, also simply known as Basta ("Whatever") and codenamed Family, is a 2020 television commercial produced for RC Cola in the Philippines by advertising agency Gigil. It was first released online in November 2020.

== Plot ==
A boy returns from school and questions his mother if he is adopted because he is being bullied. The boy took off his uniform to show his mother four glasses embedded on his back. This prompts his mother to remove her head, under which there is a bottle of RC Cola. The commercial ends with the rest of the family drinking RC Cola via the glasses on the boy's back.

== Campaign ==
=== Development ===
Manila-based advertising agency Gigil is responsible for the Basta commercial which they produced for RC Cola Philippines, which have been their client for two years at the time of the commercial's release. The advertisement's brief called for an ad that would differentiate the RC Cola brand to the Gen Z, their target demographic, since that sodas in the Philippine market has reached parity in terms of pricing.

They live in the moment. They don't need a list of reasons before they do something. They can do or buy something because—well, you know, whatever. There’s no need to explain. We appropriated that attitude and made the brand stand for it. Making the RC a mirror of our drinker.

— Gigil Managing Partner Jake Yrastorza on the ad's relation to its target audience

Gigil Associate Creative Director Dionie Tañada, who notes that sodas advertisement in the Philippines typically used music marketing and taste tests, said that ad agency decided to use humor as an approach. Describing the output as similar to advertisements released in Thailand, Basta's "approach is acknowledged by Tanada as "unexpected approach for the Filipino market" but added that the agency decided to risk the approach since they find the Gen Z audience as familiar with the "offbeat humor and storytelling" due to them being exposed to "everything digital 24/7".

The concept for the Basta advertisement was first pitched to RC Cola Philippines by Gigil in late 2019. The approved concept is one of three proposals. The advertisement reportedly had no issue in getting approved by the Ad Standards Council.

=== Production ===
Indie film director Marius Talampas was responsible for producing Basta. Gigil took the service of a director who isn't too "commercial", who could contribute "fresh insight into the material". Dionie Tañada wrote the advertisement which ran for 1 minute and 37 seconds.Fast Company described the commercial as an example of oddvertising, a subgenre characterized by increasingly bizarre ads meant to garner immediate attention to an audience in the digital age. Filming started a week prior to the imposition of the enhanced community quarantine in Luzon as a response to the COVID-19 pandemic in March 2020. This gave time for Gigil to work further on the advertisement to make sure that it "won't look gross".

== Release ==
External videos
- Basta commercial by Gigil

Basta was first released in November 2020 on RC Cola Philippines' Facebook page.

In the United States, the ad was featured in the January 23, 2021 broadcast of The Ellen DeGeneres Show particularly in the "Ellen and Twitch Guess What’s Going to Happen Next in This Crazy Commercial" segment.

== Reception ==
Basta garnered mixed audience reception due to its bizarre plot. By February 2021, the advertisement harnered 51 million views and was shared 366,000 times across social media platforms. In the same month, RC Cola Philippines claimed that the ad contributed to a 67 percent increase of sales of its products.

The advertisement also received positive critical reception. In 2021, Gigil was given the silver award for Basta for the advertising category at the 42nd Australasian Writers and Art Directors (AWARD) Awards. The commercial was also given the bronze award for the Film category in the 2020/2021 Cannes Lions International Creativity Festival. The commercial was also given a bronze award at the 2021 Asia Pacific Effie Awards for the Youth Marketing category. In 2022, the commercial was given a silver award at the 2022 Asia Pacific Effie Awards for the Beverages, Non-Alcohol category and the Short Video Marketing category and a bronze award for Film at the 2022 Clio Awards.
