= Nehi =

American flavored soft drink

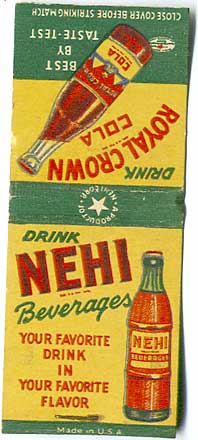
- Advertisement for Nehi soda on a matchcover
- Type: Soda
- Inventor: Claud A. Hatcher
- Inception: 1924; 102 years ago
- Manufacturer: Keurig Dr Pepper
- Available: Yes

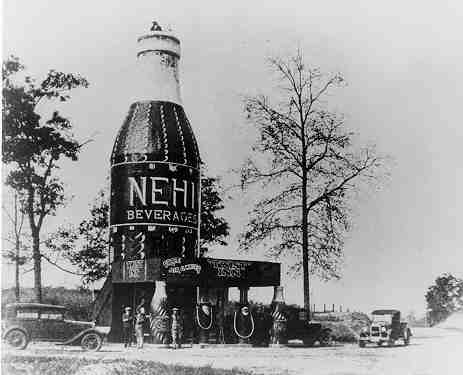
The Bottle (1924), Alabama

Nehi (/ˈniːhaɪ/ NEE-hy) is a flavored soft drink that originated in the United States. It was introduced in 1924 by Chero-Cola and founded by Claud A. Hatcher, a Columbus, Georgia, grocer who began bottling ginger ale and root beer in 1905.

The "Nehi Corporation" name was adopted in 1928 after the Nehi fruit-flavored sodas became popular. In 1955, the company changed its name to Royal Crown Company, after the success of its RC Cola brand. In April 2008, Nehi became a brand of Dr Pepper Snapple Group (now known as Keurig Dr Pepper) in the United States.

== History ==
The Chero-Cola company added Nehi Cola to its line of sodas in 1924 in order to offer a broader variety of flavors. The soda was a creation of businessman Claud A. Hatcher. The name "Nehi" was to remind customers that it came in "knee-high" tall bottles. It offered orange, grape, root beer, peach, and other flavors of soda. Nehi was instantly successful and outsold Chero-Cola entirely.

The company changed its name to the Nehi Corporation in 1928 and was listed on the New York Curb Exchange. Business went well until 1930 when a major crisis occurred. Reflecting the Great Depression, which followed the stock market crash of October 1929, the Nehi Corporation's sales figures dropped by $1 million in 1930 from a high of $3.7 million in the previous year. Sales continued to decline until 1932, the only year in which the company ever lost money.

By 1933, the low point was past, and the business was just beginning to stabilize when another tragedy struck. Claud A. Hatcher, the company's president and guiding light from its formation, died suddenly December 31, 1933. Hatcher was soon replaced by H. R. Mott, vice president of the Nehi Corporation for several years beforehand, who had been associated with the company since 1920. As the new president, he was greeted with a great amount of debt. His all-consuming ambition was to make the company debt-free as quickly as possible and to keep it that way. He updated operations, obtained extensions of credit, and cut expenses. Within a year, the Nehi Corporation was debt-free and ready to move ahead once more.

=== Advertising ===
In the early 20th century, the national advertising logo of Nehi was typically a picture of a seated woman's legs, in which the skirt was high enough to show the stockings up to the knee, suggesting the phrase "knee-high", to illustrate the correct pronunciation of the company name. This logo was seen in the film Paper Moon in a diner where Moses Pray buys Addie Loggins a Nehi. A more provocative, Midwestern version of the logo—one showing a single, thigh-high disembodied leg without a skirt—was referenced in Jean Shepherd's story "My Old Man and the Lascivious Special Award That Heralded the Birth of Pop Art" in the book In God We Trust, All Others Pay Cash, as well as in the film A Christmas Story, which was adapted from several short stories in the book. Shepherd's invention of the now-famous "Leg Lamp" in his stories of the Depression era was derived from the Midwestern Nehi logo.

Robert Ripley advertised Nehi on his radio show Ripley's Believe It or Not! The radio show was successful in promoting the new RC Cola brand and, by 1940, the company was doing well financially. In 1946, the pace for the corporation accelerated tremendously. The company began to enhance its advertising by using celebrities. Bing Crosby, Joan Crawford (before joining the Pepsi Cola Company board of directors), Bob Hope, and many others joined in selling the products of the Nehi Corporation. When World War II was over, the company and its bottlers joined in a progressive program of expansion and improvement that made 1947 one of its best years. In that year, Hedy Lamarr was pictured in point-of-purchase advertising signs. At that time, the Nehi Corporation offered more than 10 flavors and those included Dr. Nehi, Nehi Chocolate, Nehi Root Beer, Nehi Lemonade, Nehi Wild Red, Nehi Blue Cream, and its more classic flavors Nehi Orange, Nehi Grape, and Nehi Peach. Many of these flavors were later dropped as their novelty and popularity waned. A fictional illustration of the popularity of the drink in this era is seen in the character Cpl. Walter "Radar" O'Reilly, the company clerk on the long-running television series M*A*S*H, set during the Korean War; Radar's favorite beverage was Grape Nehi.

== See also ==
- The Bottle, Alabama – Unincorporated community in Alabama, United States
- Schweppes – Soft drink brand used by companies such as Coca-Cola, Suntory, etc
- Coca-Cola – Cola soft drink
- Dr Pepper – Carbonated soft drink
