= Linner hue index =

Index of hues of caramel coloring

The Linner hue index, $H_L$, is used to describe the hues which a given caramel coloring may produce. In conjunction with tinctorial strength, or the depth of a caramel coloring's color, it describes the wavelength spectra which a solution of the coloring may produce at different dilutions and thicknesses. It also has applications in brewing.

In his presentation at the Society of Soft Drink Technologists Annual Meeting in 1970, Robert T. Linner mentioned that most caramel colors had log absorbance spectra which were essentially linear in the visible range. This means that such a spectrum could be characterized by a point (a log absorbance at some particular wavelength) and its slope. Because caramel colors have warm hues (i.e., greater absorbance for shorter wavelengths), the slopes of their log absorbance spectra will be negative. $H_L$ is the negative of this slope, multiplied by a convenient factor.

== Definition ==
The Linner hue index is defined as:

$$H_L = 10 \times \log_{10} \frac {A_{510}} {A_{610}}$$

This is simply the negative of the slope of the log absorbance spectrum, between 510 and 610 nm wavelength, for materials that obey Linner's hypothesis of linear log-absorbance spectra.

== Typical range ==
Linner hue indices typically range from 3 (a greenish yellow or olive hue, depending on the depth of color) to 7.5 (yellow) for caramel colors and beers.
