= Bottega Giotti =

Italian fashion company

- Industry: Fashion
- Founded: 1950; 76 years ago
- Headquarters: Florence, Italy
- Area served: Worldwide
- Products: Leather goods
- Owner: Mario Biagiotti
- Website: bottegagiotti.com

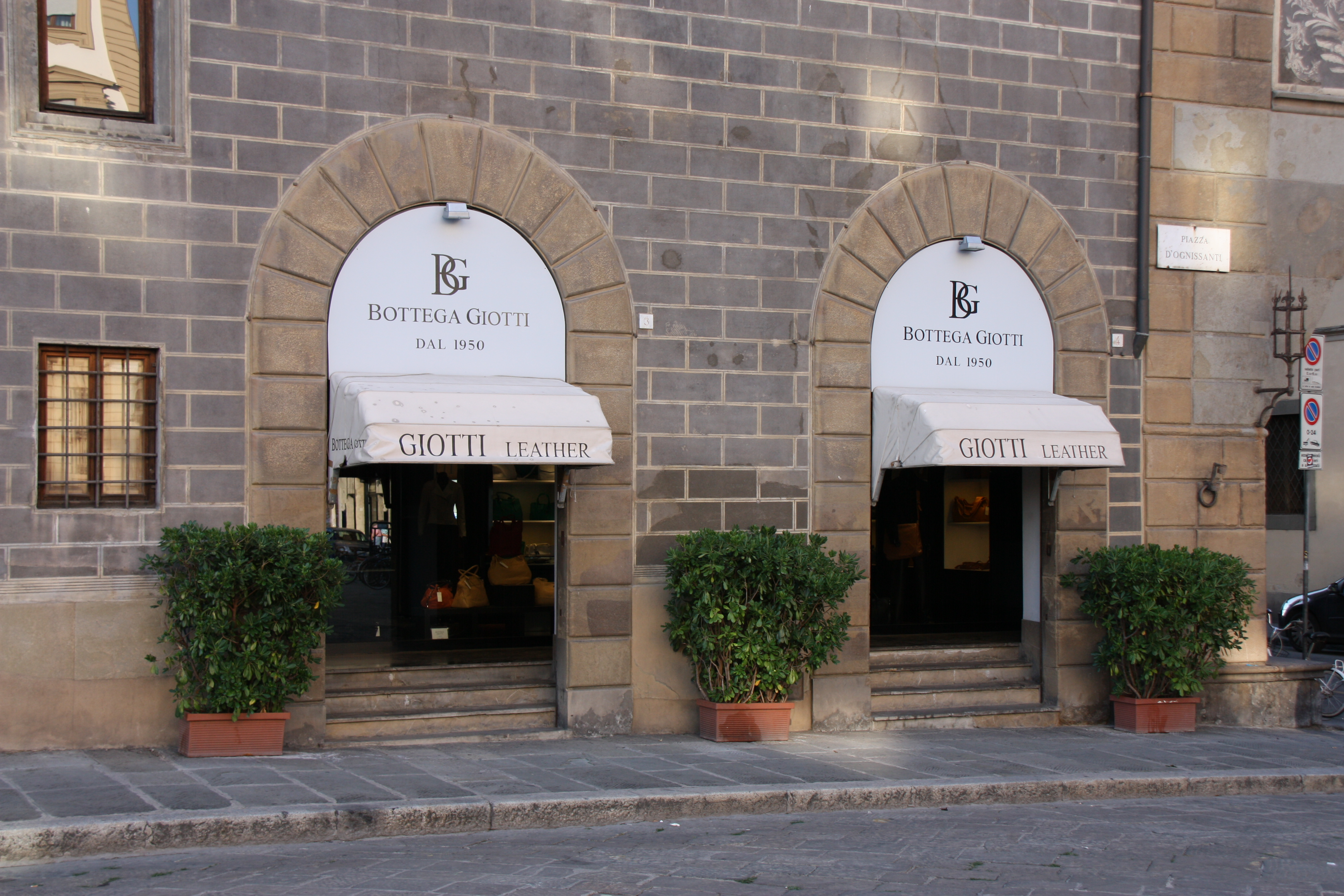
Bottega Giotti store in Florence, Italy

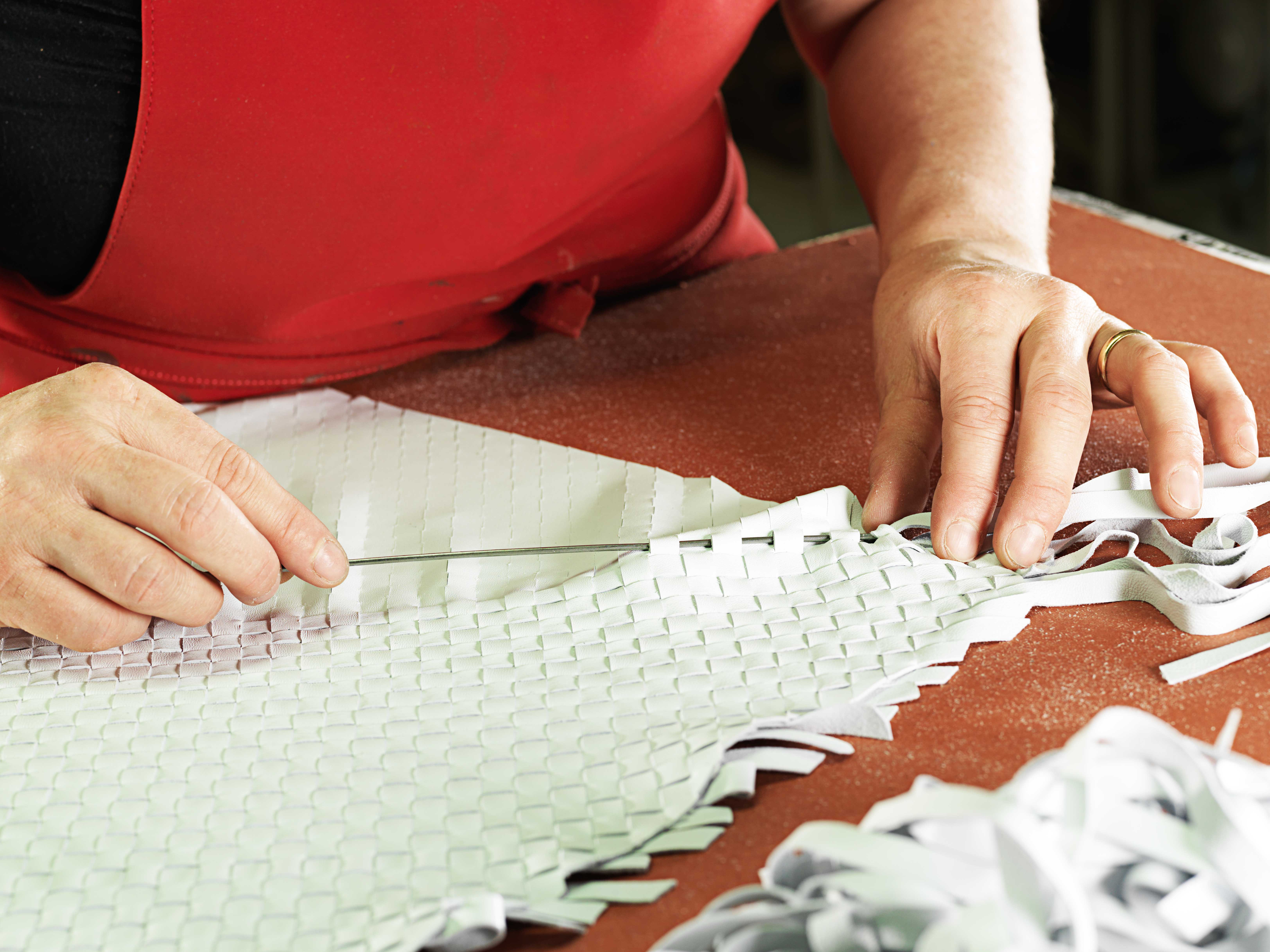
Creating an "Intrecciato" bag

Bottega Giotti is a Florence-based fashion company that specializes in intrecciato (woven) leather jackets, bags and small leather goods. Started by a local artisan in the beginning of the 20th century, it grew into an international company headquartered in Lenzi Palace in the center of Florence. The company was founded and is still owned and managed by the Biagotti family.

== History ==
The family tradition started with Attilio Biagiotti who owned a leather workshop located behind Piazza Pitti. After the second world war in 1950 Gino together with his son Mario, due to the arrival in Florence of numerous tourists from all over the world, decided to re-open the Bottega Giotti store in the Lenzi Palace.

The company is run by the owner Mario Biagiotti along with his daughter Alessandra, designer of the Bottega Giotti collection and his son Paolo.

== Export ==
In the beginning of the 2000s, Bottega Giotti started exporting leather goods to the United States for online sales. Export further grew to other European countries followed by opening of stores in Taipei and Moscow.

Due to increased sales Bottega Giotti moved production from Tuscany to a large factory in the Marche region of Italy.

== Products ==
Bottega Giotti has gained significant popularity for featherlight woven intrecciato leather goods, even though plain leather bags are offered as well. Currently the company produces leather bags, accessories, evening bags, briefcases, wallets, belts and leather coats and jackets for men and women (some lined in fur).

== See also ==
- Courtauld bag
