= International Alliance for Responsible Drinking =

Advocacy organization

International Alliance for Responsible Drinking (IARD)
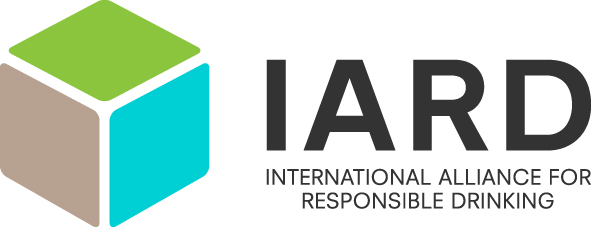
- Type: Not-for-profit Organization
- Industry: Health
- Founded: January 2015; 11 years ago
- Headquarters: Washington D.C., Geneva
- Website: www.iard.org

The International Alliance for Responsible Drinking (IARD), headquartered in Washington, D.C., is a not-for-profit organization dedicated to reducing harmful drinking and promoting responsible drinking. It is supported by twelve of the world’s leading beer, wine, and spirits producers, including Diageo, Bacardi, Beam Suntory, Brown-Forman, and the Carlsberg Group.

Julian Braithwaite is the CEO, appointed in 2024.

== History ==
IARD was launched in January 2015 and builds on two decades of research, policy analysis and programs by the International Center for Alcohol Policies (ICAP), as well as the efforts of the Global Alcohol Producers Group (GAPG).

== Initiatives ==
In 2021, IARD partnered with social media platforms like Facebook, Snapchat, and X to establish and promote responsible marketing standards for online alcohol advertising.

As of 2025, more than 100 global companies have joined IARD’s Global Standards Coalition. The coalition was launched in 2023 to implement proactive measures to reduce the sale of alcohol to those underage.
