= Stockwell (company) =

American technology company

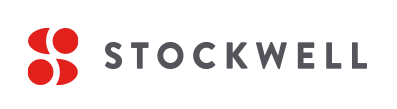
- Company type: Private
- Industry: Vending machines
- Founded: September 17, 2017; 8 years ago in Oakland, California, United States
- Founders: Paul McDonald and Ashwath Rajan
- Defunct: August 13, 2020; 5 years ago
- Fate: Acquired by 365 Retail Markets
- Headquarters: Oakland, California, United States
- Area served: San Francisco Bay Area
- Number of employees: 25 (2018)
- Website: stockwell.ai

Stockwell (formerly Bodega) was an American company. The idea behind the company was to build 5-foot-wide "pantry boxes" that contain non-perishable food and other items similar to those found in a convenience store, with Payment via a mobile app that charges the customer by credit card. The machines would use artificial intelligence to determine the 100 most commonly-purchased items and switch items if necessary.

Plans were to place the machines in places like gyms, apartment lobbies, and offices, and to build enough machines that a customer is always within 100 feet of one.

The company earned the title of "America's most hated startup".

== History ==
In 2017, Bodega was founded by former Google employees Paul McDonald and Ashwath Rajan. In 2017, the company installed over 30 locations in San Francisco.

In July 2018, the company changed its name to Stockwell, citing the negative feedback around the original name as a motivator.

In 2019, the company had 1,000 kiosks all over the country.

In June 2020, TechCrunch reported that Stockwell would shut down on July 1, 2020. On August 13, 2020, 365 Retail Markets announced it was acquiring the company for an undisclosed amount.

== Controversy ==
There was a major backlash against the concept when it was announced that machines would be installed in New York. Critics claimed that the startup could put real traditional New York bodegas out of business, and that use of the term "bodega" for the machine was culturally insensitive. There were also accusations of gentrification of New York neighborhoods. It was also claimed that the concept was similar enough to a vending machine or automat as to not be innovative. Mandatory credit card usage and cameras around the machines raised privacy concerns. The machines also do not offer some of the amenities of real bodegas, such as fresh sandwiches, or types of ethnic food local to particular New York neighborhoods. Nor did the machines offer harmful products such as alcohol and tobacco. The CEO Paul Mcdonald claimed that 97% of Latin Americans surveyed did not find the term used for the machines offensive. Many bodega owners and employees do not see the startup as a particular threat. The CEO later apologized for causing offense and claimed that it was not his intent to put local bodegas out of business.
