= Caramel coloring =

Water-soluble food coloring

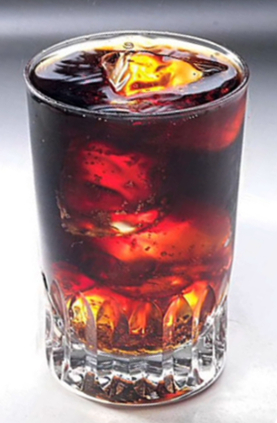
Beverages like colas account for three-quarters of the demand for caramel coloring.

Caramel color or caramel coloring is a water-soluble food coloring. It is made by heat treatment of carbohydrates (sugars), in general in the presence of acids, alkalis, or salts, in a process called caramelization. It is more fully oxidized than caramel candy, and has an odor of burnt sugar and a somewhat bitter taste. Its color ranges from pale yellow to amber to dark brown.

Caramel color is one of the oldest and most used food colorings for enhancing naturally occurring colors, correcting natural variations in color, and replacing color that is lost to light degradation during food processing and storage. The use of caramel color as a food additive in the brewing industry in the 19th century is the first recorded instance of its being manufactured and used on a wide scale. Caramel color is found in many commercially made foods and beverages, including batters, beer, brown bread, buns, chocolate, cookies, cough drops, spirits and liquor such as brandy, rum, and whisky, chocolate-flavored confectionery and coatings, custards, decorations, fillings and toppings, potato chips, dessert mixes, doughnuts, fish and shellfish spreads, frozen desserts, fruit preserves, glucose tablets, gravy, ice cream, pickles, sauces and dressings, soft drinks (especially colas), sweets, and vinegar. Caramel color is widely approved for use in food globally, but application and use level restrictions vary by country.

It is assigned E numbers E150a to d depending on the chemical, and it is approved for use as a food colouring in the EU, UK and US.

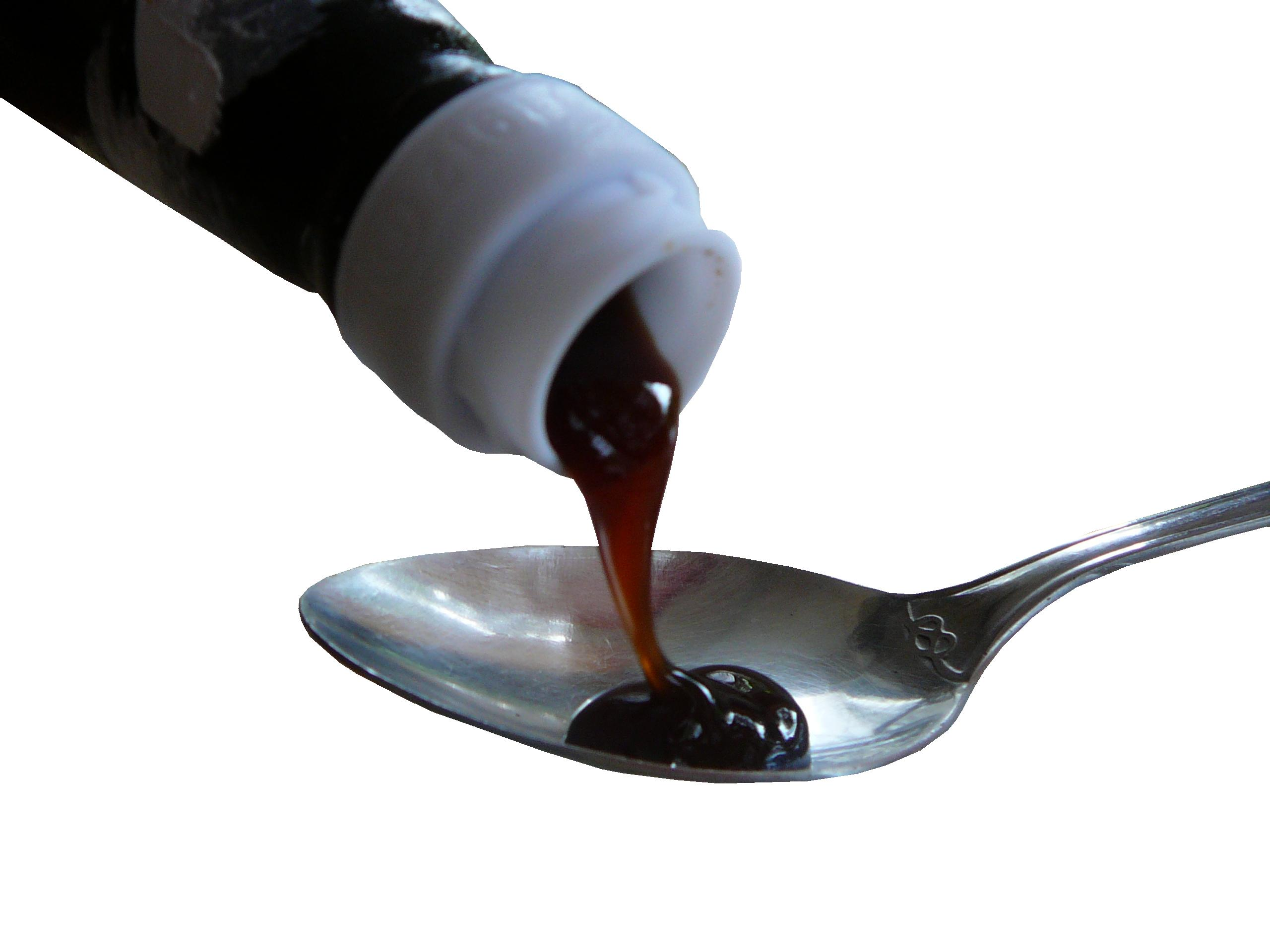
In East Asia, the demand for caramel color in sauces exceeds that for beverages.

== Production ==
Caramel color is manufactured by heating carbohydrates, either alone or in the presence of acids, alkalis, and/or salts. Caramel color is produced from commercially available nutritive sweeteners consisting of fructose, dextrose (glucose), invert sugar, sucrose, malt syrup, molasses, starch hydrolysates, and fractions thereof. The acids that may be used are sulfuric, sulfurous, phosphoric, acetic, and citric acids; the alkalis are ammonium, sodium, potassium, and calcium hydroxides; and the salts are ammonium, sodium, and potassium carbonate, bicarbonate, phosphate (including mono- and dibasic), sulfate, and bisulfite. Antifoaming agents, such as polyglycerol esters of fatty acids, may be used as processing aids during manufacture. Its color ranges from pale yellow to amber to dark brown.

Caramel color molecules carry either positive or a negative charges depending upon the reactants used in their manufacture. Problems such as precipitation, flocculation, or migration can be eliminated with the use of a properly charged caramel color for the intended application.

== Classification ==
Internationally, the United Nations' Joint Food and Agriculture Organization/World Health Organization Expert Committee on Food Additives (JECFA) recognizes four classes of caramel color, differing by the reactants used in their manufacture, each with its own INS and E number, listed in the table below. Each class consists of a variety of caramels with their own unique properties that make it suitable for use in specific foods and/or beverages.

Class	INS / E number	Description	Properties, qualities, and benefits	Used in
I	150a / E150a	Plain caramel, caustic caramel, spirit caramel	Strong aftertaste and mild aroma; color ranges from yellow to red; stable in alcohol, tannin, and salt-rich environments	Whiskey and other high proof alcohols, pet food, cookies, crackers, cereal bars, other baked goods, lemonade products, juice concentrates, and cocoa extenders
II	150b / E150b	Caustic sulfite caramel	Mild flavor and aroma; exceptional red tone; good stability in alcohol	Tea, wine, rum, whiskey, brandy, cognac, sherry, some vinegars, light cake mixes, and other snack foods
III	150c / E150c	Ammonia caramel, baker's caramel, confectioner's caramel, beer caramel	Sweet aroma; red-brown color; stable in alcohol and salt-rich environments	Beer, cereal, pet food, licorice, confectionery, and gravy, soy, and BBQ sauce
IV	150d / E150d	Sulfite ammonia caramel, acid-proof caramel, soft-drink caramel	Very mild flavor and aroma; rich dark brown color; stable in alcohol, tannin, and acid-rich environments	Soft drinks and other carbonated beverages, balsamic vinegar, coffee, chocolate syrups, baked goods, cocoa extenders, pet foods, sauces, soups, meat rubs, seasoning blends, and other flavorings

== Color ==
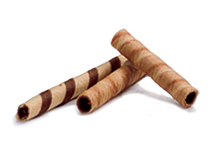
Wafer sticks containing caramel color are common in Greece, Turkey, Indonesia and other countries.

Color intensity (or, tinctorial power) is defined as the absorbance of a 1 mg/mL (0.1% weight/volume) solution in water, measured using a 1 cm light path at a wavelength of 610 nanometers (or 560 nm for tinctorial power). In this case, A stands for absorbance and TS stands for total solids.

$$\text{Color intensity} = \frac{100 \times A}{TS}$$

The color tone of the caramel color is also important. This is defined by the Linner Hue Index, which is the measure of the color hue or red characteristics of the caramel color. It is a function of the absorbance of light of wavelengths 510 and 610 nm. In general, the higher the Tinctorial Power, K_{0.56}, the lower the Hue Index and the lower the red tones.

Various other indices are in use around the world and there are conversion factors between them.

== Additional function ==
Caramel color is a colloid. Though the primary function of caramel color is for coloration, it also serves additional functions. In soft drinks, it can function as an emulsifier to help inhibit the formation of certain types of "floc" and its light protective quality can aid in preventing oxidation of the flavoring components in bottled beverages.

== Safety ==
Internationally, JECFA has set the Acceptable Daily Intake (ADI) of Class I caramel color as "not specified"; that of Class II as 0–160 mg/kg body weight; and that of Class III and IV as 0–200 mg/kg body weight.

The United States Food and Drug Administration (FDA) classifies and regulates caramel color in Title 21 CFR § 73.85 as an approved color additive exempt from certification. Unless a food has a standard of identity, caramel color may be safely used in foods generally at levels consistent with "good manufacturing practice" (GMP).

Caramel color has excellent microbiological stability. Since it is manufactured under very high temperature, high acidity, high pressure, and high specific gravity, it is essentially sterile, as it will not support microbial growth unless in a dilute solution.

When reacted with sulfites, caramel color may retain traces of sulfite after processing. However, in finished food products, labeling is usually required only for sulfite levels above 10 ppm.

=== Toxicology ===
In 2010, the International Programme on Chemical Safety (IPCS) concluded that commercially produced caramel color has the same toxicological properties as caramel produced by cooking or heating sucrose, except for those prepared using ammonium (Class III and IV). The IPCS has concluded that caramel color does not exhibit carcinogenicity or mutagenicity, based on its studies. Additional long-term studies support a conclusion that caramel colors are not carcinogenic. While the US FDA, Canadian Health Products and Food Branch and European Food Safety Authority (EFSA) have found caramel color safe for use in food and beverages, California has listed 4-Methylimidazole (4-MeI), a compound formed in the manufacture of Class III and IV caramel colors, in the state's Proposition 65, thus legally including it in the category of chemicals "known to the state to cause cancer or reproductive toxicity". According to the Food Chemicals Codex, 4-MeI in caramel color is allowed up to 250 ppm on a color-adjusted basis, which means 250 ppm maximum for every 0.100 color absorbance of a 0.10% solution at 610 nm. The exposure to 4-MeI at levels present in Class III and IV caramel colors are not expected to be of concern for two reasons. Firstly, 4-MeI does not appear to be genotoxic or metabolized to a reactive metabolite. Secondly, carcinogenic doses of 4-MeI exceed estimates of exposure from the consumption of caramel coloring by several thousand-fold.

=== Food allergies ===
Caramel coloring may be derived from a variety of source products that are themselves common allergens, namely starch hydrolysates (from wheat), malt syrup (in general derived from barley), or lactose (from milk). As such, persons with known sensitivities or allergies to food products are advised to avoid foods including generic caramel coloring or first determine the source for the caramel coloring before consuming the food. Caramel color produced from corn or cane-based materials would be unlikely to contain gluten due to the lack of gliadin in the carbohydrates. North American and European manufacturers mostly use glucose derived from corn or wheat to produce caramel color, which is highly processed and is generally considered gluten-free.

== Sources ==
- Joint FAO/WHO Expert Committee on Food Additives (JECFA) specification for Caramel Colours
- U.S. Food and Drug Administration definition of Caramel, Code of Federal Regulations 21 CFR 73.85
- European Commission Directive 95/45/EC (26 July 1995) on food color purity
- International Programme on Chemical Safety INCHEM Database
