= Refresco =

Dutch soft drinks manufacturer

Refresco Group
- Founded: 2000
- Headquarters: Fascinatio Boulevard 270; 3065 WB Rotterdam
- Key people: Steve Presley (CEO)Bill McFarland (CFO)
- Products: Soft drinks, fruit juices, water, ice tea, energy drinks, alcohol, plant-based drinks.
- Revenue: €6.1 billion (2025)
- Net income: €826 million (2025)
- Number of employees: 14,639 (in FTE, as of end 2023)
- Website: refresco.com

Refresco, previously known as Liko from the 1960s to 1995, is a Dutch producer of soft drinks, water, fruit juices, energy drinks, alcohol, and plant-based drinks. The products are not sold under its own brand name but rather as private-label products for supermarkets or under the name of A-brand manufacturers. The company processes a volume of approximately 11.7 billion liters and has an annual revenue of over €4 billion. Its headquarters are located in Rotterdam. The company was listed on the Amsterdam Stock Exchange from 2015 to 2017.

== History ==
In the early 1960s, soft drinks under the name Liko were produced at the Menken dairy factory in Wassenaar, Netherlands. When the production of soft drinks expanded, a new Liko factory was opened in Bodegraven in 1970. In 1995, Liko rebranded to Menken Drinks, from which Refresco was created through a management buy-out in 2000.

In 2007, Refresco takes over the Netherlands-based Sun Beverages, thereby expanding its Dutch and Belgian production locations. In 2009, a Bavaria based beverage company known as Schiffers Food was taken over by Refresco.

With the acquisition of the German company Soft Drinks International, €140 million was added to turnover in 2010.

In 2013, Refresco merged with Gerber Emig, a European bottler of fruit juices. Gerber Emig's headquarters are in Bridgwater, England. Gerber Emig shareholders were allocated 30% of the company's shares and Refresco shareholders the remaining 70. In October 2013, Refresco received permission from the European Commission to take over Gerber Emig, on the condition that Gerber Emig's German branch in Waibstadt would be sold. The companies continued under the name Refresco Gerber. The juice factory in Waibstadt was sold to the Riha WeserGold Group in 2014.

More acquisitions were made in 2016. When The Sittard Bottler DIS (Dranken Industrie Sittard) was taken over by Refresco for €72 million.

On 30 January 2018, Refresco acquired Cott's carbonated soft drinks and juice bottling businesses for US$1.25 billion. The transaction included the Cott business units in North America, the UK and Mexico.

Based on a 1997 permit, Refresco can pump up 500,000 m³ of groundwater annually for beverage production in Maarheeze. In 2018, Refresco submitted an application to increase this by 50% to 750,000 m³. The provincial permit granted was in conflict with North Brabant's own groundwater policy and during the court case Refresco oversaw the closure of the factory in Maarheeze.
