= List of soft drink producers =

In every area of the world there are major soft drink producers. However, a few major North American companies are present in most of the countries of the world, such as Pepsi and Coca-Cola.

== Producers by region ==
=== North America ===
- Big 8 Beverages
- The Coca-Cola Company
- Jones Soda
- Keurig Dr Pepper
  - RC Cola
- Leading Brands
- National Beverage
  - Faygo
  - Shasta
- Niagara Bottling
- Novamex
- Pascual Boing: leading soft drink producer in Mexico since The Coca-Cola Company bought Jugos del Valle in 2007
- PepsiCo
- Polar Beverages
- Primo Water
- Reed's
- Zevia

=== South America ===
- Ajegroup: (Peruvian origin, operates in 14 countries, now headquartered in Mexico), producers of Big Cola, Cielo (mineral water), Cifrut (fruit juice), Free Tea, Free World Light (referred to locally as Free Light), Kola Real, Oro, Pulp (nectar), Sporade (sports drink) and Volt (energy drink)
- AmBev: (Brazil, operates in 14 countries, owned by Anheuser-Busch InBev), the largest bottler of Pepsi Cola products outside the United States, also produces Guarana Antarctica, Soda Limonada, Sukita, H2OH! and Guara!
- Corporación José R. Lindley S.A.: (Peru), producers of Aquarius (flavored water), Burn (energy drink), Coca-Cola, Crush, Fanta, Inca Kola, Kola Inglesa, Powerade (energy drink), and Sprite
- Embotelladora Don Jorge S.A.C.: (Peru), producers of Agua Vida (mineral water), Click (fruit drink), Isaac Kola and Perú Cola (energy drink)

=== Europe ===
- Barr
- Britvic
- Epsa
- Farsons
- Kofola
- Schweppes
- Sumol + Compal

=== Africa ===
- Hamoud Boualem

=== Middle East ===
- Drinko
- Zamzam

=== East Asia ===
- Fraser and Neave
- HeySong Corporation
- Ramune
- Vitasoy

=== South Asia ===
==== Bangladesh ====
- Akij
  - Mojo
- PRAN Group

==== India ====
- Bisleri
- Dabur
- Parle
- Paper Boat

==== Pakistan ====
- Murree Brewery
- Amrat Cola

=== Australia ===
- Bickford's Australia
- Bundaberg Brewed Drinks
- Cascade Beverages
- Coca-Cola Amatil
- Noosa Beverages
- Kirks
- Saxbys Soft Drinks
- Schweppes Australia
- Trend Drinks
- Tru Blu Beverages

=== East Asia ===
==== Japan ====
- Asahi Soft Drinks
- Ito En
- Kirin Brewery Company
- Suntory

== See also ==
- List of brand name soft drink products
- List of soft drink flavors
- List of soft drinks by country
