= List of companies of Peru =

Location of Peru

Peru is a country in western South America. Services account for 53% of Peruvian gross domestic product, followed by manufacturing (22.3%), extractive industries (15%), and taxes (9.7%). Recent economic growth has been fueled by macroeconomic stability, improved terms of trade, and rising investment and consumption. Peru's main exports are copper, gold, zinc, textiles, and fish meal; its major trade partners are the United States, China, Brazil, and Chile.

For further information on the types of business entities in this country and their abbreviations, see "Business entities in Peru".

== Notable firms ==
This list includes notable companies with primary headquarters located in the country. The industry and sector follow the Industry Classification Benchmark taxonomy. Organizations which have ceased operations are included and noted as defunct.

Notable companies Status: P=Private, S=State; A=Active, D=Defunct
| Name | Industry | Sector | Headquarters | Founded | Notes | Status | |
|---|---|---|---|---|---|---|---|
| Aero Cóndor | Consumer services | Airlines | Lima | 1975 | Airline, defunct 2008 | P | D |
| Aeropuertos del Perú | Industrials | Transportation services | Lima | 2006 | Airports | P | A |
| Agroindustrial Casa Grande | Consumer goods | Farming & fishing | Chocope | 1996 | Agriculture | P | A |
| Agroindustrial Pomalca | Consumer goods | Farming & fishing | Chiclayo | 1996 | Agriculture | P | A |
| Air Perú | Consumer services | Airlines | Lima | 2006 | Airline, defunct 2009 | P | D |
| Ajegroup | Consumer goods | Soft drinks | Lima | 1988 | Beverages | P | A |
| Alicorp | Consumer goods | Personal products | Lima | 1956 | Food, soaps, laundry | P | A |
| América Televisión | Consumer services | Broadcasting & entertainment | Lima | 1958 | Television network | P | A |
| Andahuasi | Consumer goods | Farming & fishing | Lima | 1923 | Agriculture | P | A |
| Avianca Perú | Consumer services | Airlines | Lima | 1999 | Airline, defunct 2020 | P | D |
| AviaSelva | Consumer services | Airlines | Iquitos | 2007 | Airline, defunct 2008 | P | D |
| Backus and Johnston Brewery | Consumer goods | Brewers | Lima | 1879 | Brewery | P | A |
| Banco de Crédito del Perú | Financials | Banks | Lima | 1889 | Bank | P | A |
| Banco de la Nación | Financials | Banks | Lima | 1966 | Bank | S | A |
| Bembos | Consumer services | Restaurants & bars | Lima | 1988 | Fast food chain | P | A |
| Canal N | Consumer services | Broadcasting & entertainment | Lima | 1999 | News channel | P | A |
| Cementos Pacasmayo | Industrials | Building materials & fixtures | Lima | 1949 | Cement | P | A |
| Cerro Verde | Basic materials | General mining | Arequipa | 1970 | Mining | P | A |
| Cielos Airlines | Industrials | Industrial transportation | Callao | 1997 | Cargo airline, defunct 2006 | P | D |
| Cielos del Oriente | Consumer services | Airlines | Tarapoto | ? | Charter airline | P | D |
| Compañía Minera Atacocha | Basic materials | General mining | Lima | 1936 | Mining | P | A |
| Compañía Minera Milpo | Basic materials | General mining | Lima | 1949 | Mining | P | A |
| Compañía Nacional de Chocolates de Perú S.A. | Consumer goods | Food products | Lima | 2007 | Chocolates | P | A |
| Corporación Lindley S.A. | Consumer goods | Soft drinks | Lima | 1910 | Beverages | P | A |
| Don Jorge | Consumer goods | Soft drinks | Lima | 1947 | Beverages | P | A |
| Dunkelvolk | Consumer goods | Recreational products | Lima | 1996 | Sporting goods | P | A |
| Edegel | Utilities | Conventional electricity | Lima | 1906 | Power generation | P | A |
| Empresa Nacional de Ferrocarriles del Peru | Industrials | Railroads | Lima | 1972 | Railway | P | A |
| Enrique Cassinelli and Sons | Consumer goods | Soft drinks | Trujillo | 1910 | Beverages | P | A |
| Ferreyros | Industrials | Industrial machinery | Lima | 1922 | Mining equipment | P | A |
| Graña y Montero | Industrials | Heavy construction | Lima | 1933 | Development | P | A |
| Grupo Breca | Consumer services | - | Lima | - | Conglomerate | P | A |
| Interbank | Financials | Banks | Lima | 1897 | Bank | P | A |
| La Iberica | Consumer goods | Food products | Arequipa | 1909 | Chocolate | P | A |
| LATAM Perú | Consumer services | Airlines | Lima | 1998 | Airline | P | A |
| LC Perú | Consumer services | Airlines | Lima | 1993 | Airline | P | A |
| Lima Airport Partners | Industrials | Transportation services | Lima | 2001 | Airport | P | A |
| Luz del Sur | Utilities | Conventional electricity | Lima | 1994 | Power distribution | P | A |
| Maple Energy | Oil & gas | Exploration & production | Lima | 1986 | Oil & gas extraction | P | A |
| Mariategui JLT | Financials | Insurance brokers | Lima | 1987 | Insurance brokerage | P | A |
| Minera IRL | Basic materials | General mining | Lima | 2000 | Mining | P | A |
| Minsur | Basic materials | General mining | Lima | 1966 | Mining, tin and copper | P | A |
| Modasa | Industrials | Commercial vehicles | Lima | 1974 | Buses | P | A |
| Panamericana Televisión | Consumer services | Broadcasting & entertainment | Lima | 1959 | Broadcasting | P | A |
| Peru LNG | Oil & gas | Exploration & productions | San Vicente de Cañete | 2010 | Gas plant | P | A |
| Peruvian Airlines | Consumer services | Airlines | Lima | 2009 | Airline, defunct 2019 | P | D |
| Petroperú | Oil & gas | Exploration & production | Lima | 1969 | State petroleum | S | A |
| Plaza Vea | Consumer services | Food retailers & wholesalers | Lima | 2001 | Supermarket chain, part of Supermercados Peruanos | P | A |
| Serpost | Industrials | Delivery services | Lima | 1991 | Postal services | S | A |
| SIDERPERU | Basic materials | Iron & steel | Chimbote | 1956 | Steel & iron | P | A |
| SIMA | Industrials | Marine transportation | Callao | 1950 | Shipping | S | A |
| Star Perú | Consumer services | Airlines | Lima | 1997 | Airline | P | A |
| Super Epsa | Consumer services | Food retailers & wholesalers | Lima | 1953 | Supermarket chain | P | A |
| Supermercados Peruanos | Consumer services | Food retailers & wholesalers | Lima | 1993 | Supermarket chain | P | A |
| Transportes Aéreos Cielos Andinos | Consumer services | Airlines | Lima | 2007 | Airline | P | A |
| TV Perú | Consumer services | Broadcasting & entertainment | Lima | 1958 | Television | S | A |
| Vivanda | Consumer services | Food retailers & wholesalers | Lima | 2005 | Supermarket chain, part of Supermercados Peruanos | P | A |
| Volcan (mining company) | Basic materials | General mining | ? | 1943 | Mining | P | A |
| Walon Sport | Consumer goods | Clothing & accessories | Lima | 1989 | Sportswear | P | A |
| Wong (supermarket) | Consumer services | Food retailers & wholesalers | Lima | 1983 | Supermarkets | P | A |

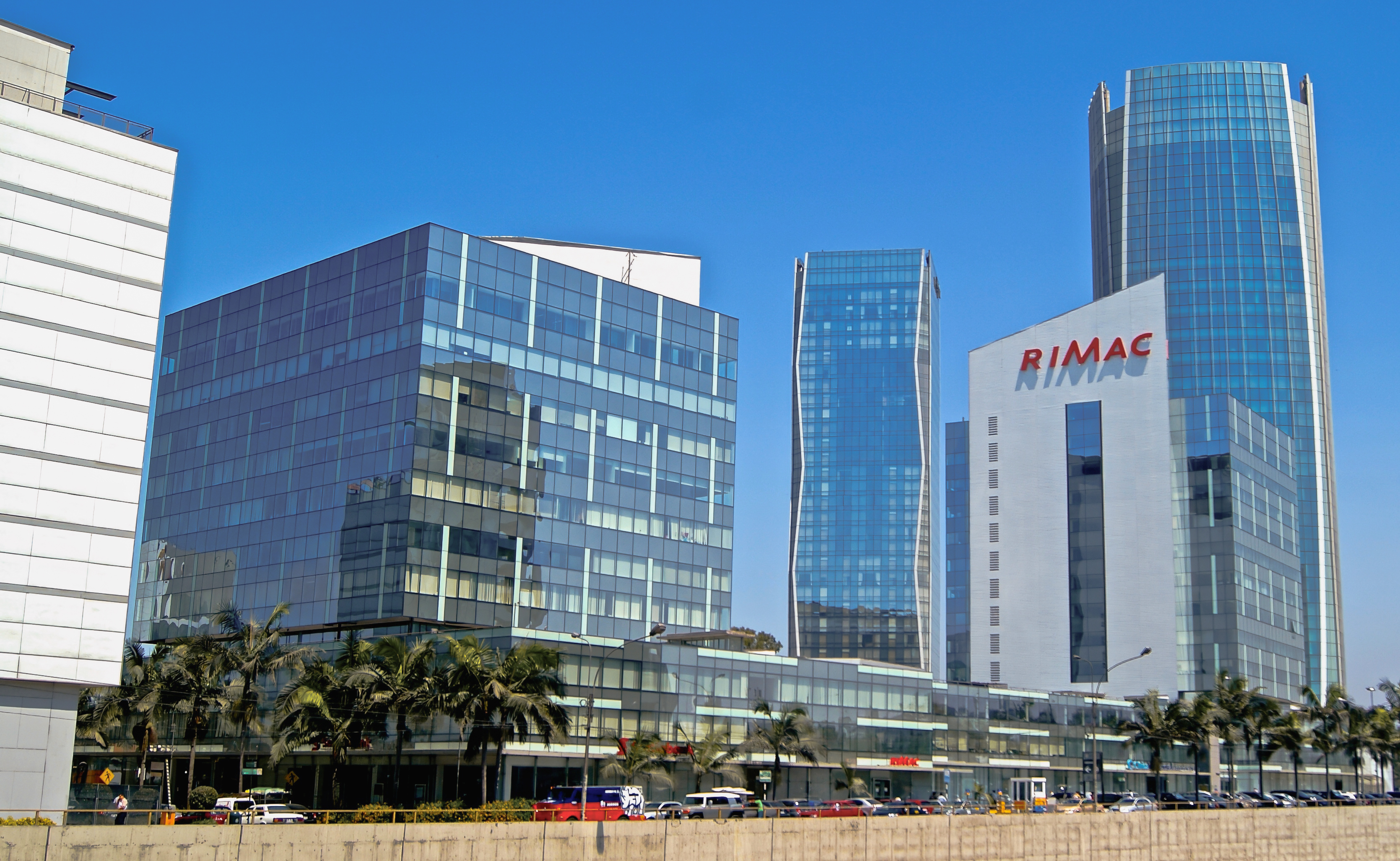
Financial center in Lima.

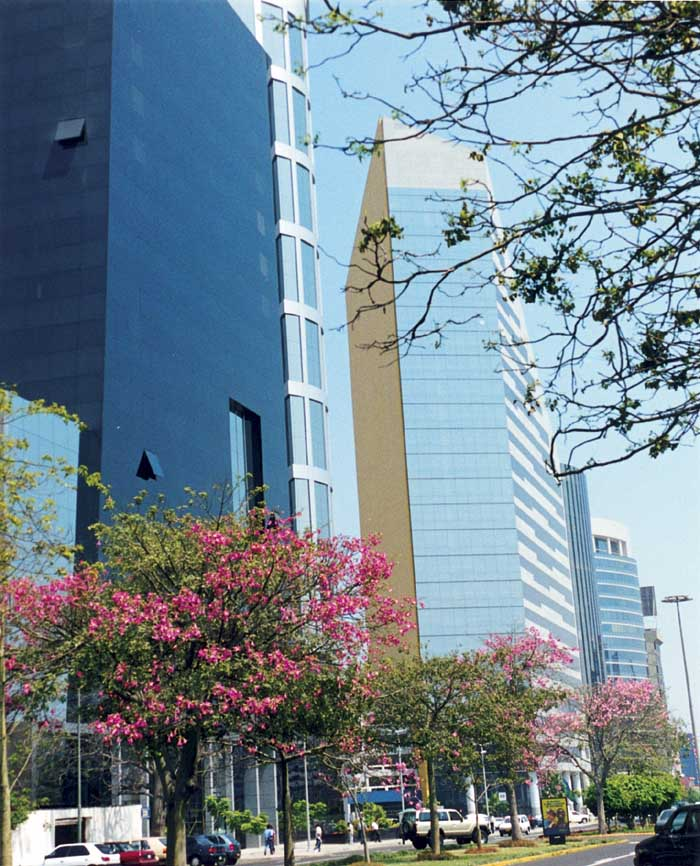
Lima's financial district of San Isidro.

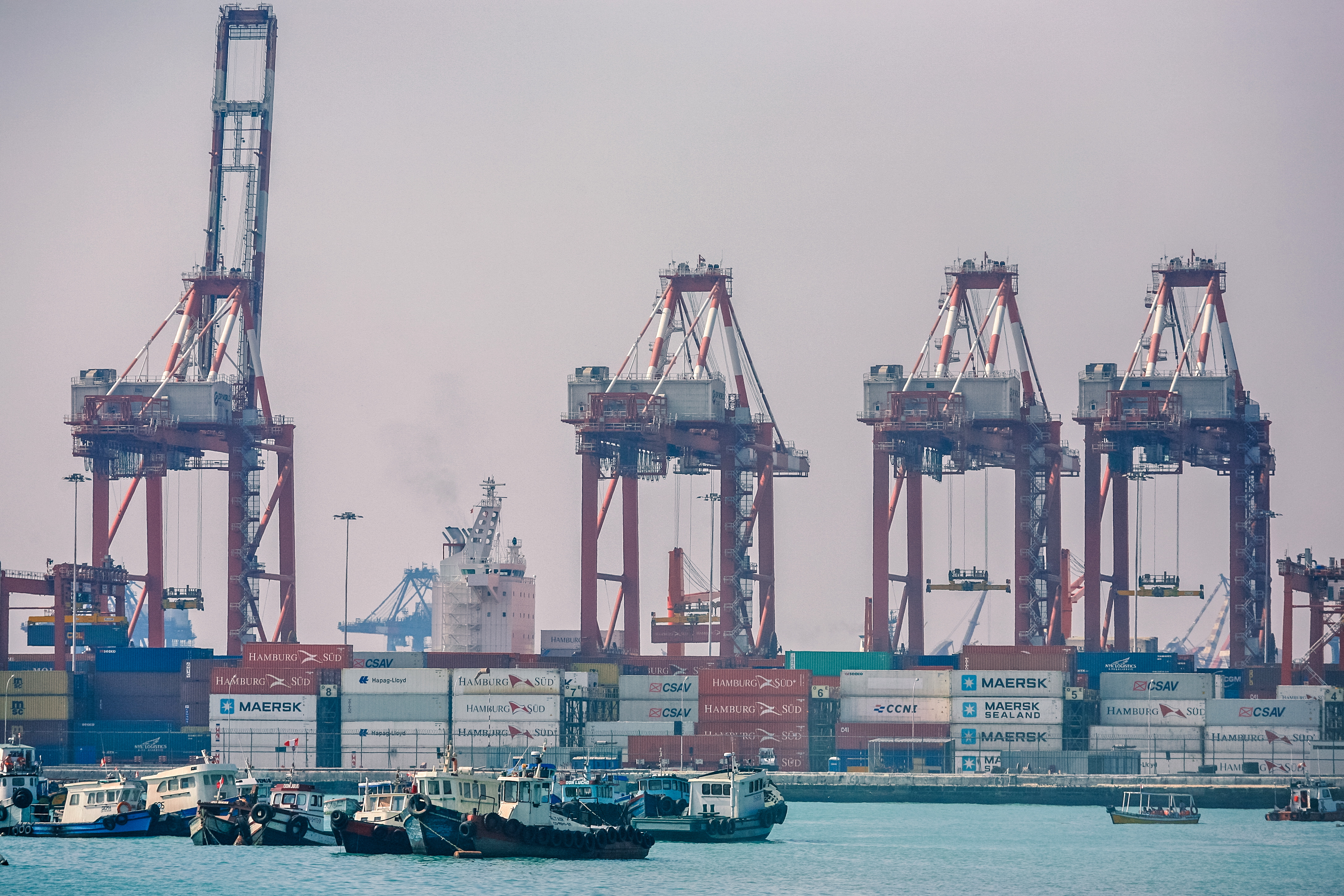
The Callao seaport.

== See also ==
- List of airlines of Peru
- List of beverage companies of Peru
