= List of beverage companies of Peru =

This is a selected list of beverage companies of Peru:

- Anheuser-Busch InBev, largest producer of beer worldwide, produces the Brahma beer in Peru.
- AJEPER is the Peruvian division of the international Peruvian company Ajegroup — producer of soft drinks (Kola Real, Big Cola, Oro) and beer (Franca, Caral).
- Unión de Cervecerías Peruanas Backus y Johnston S.A.A. — producer of beer (Cristal, Cusqueña, Pilsen Callao, Trujillo), other alcoholic beverages, and non-alcoholic beverages (Guaraná, Maltin Power, Viva).
- Corporación José R. Lindley S.A. — producer of soft drinks (Inca Kola, Coca-Cola, Sprite, Fanta, Crush).
- Embotelladora Don Jorge S.A.C. — producer of soft drinks (Perú Cola, Isaac Kola, Click), and alcoholic beverages (Climax).
- Enrique Cassinelli and Sons — producer of soft drinks (Cassinelli, Liber).
