= Cassinelli (soft drink) =

Peruvian soft-drink

- Type: Cola
- Manufacturer: Enrique Cassinelli and Sons
- Country of origin: Peru
- Variants: cola, champagne, strawberry, pineapple, orange, soda and dorada
- Related products: Kola Real, Crush Naranja, Concordia, Perú Cola

Cassinelli is a Peruvian range of soft drinks. Cassinelli is a brand of the Enrique Cassinelli and Sons company in Trujillo, Peru, and is sold in glass bottles of 296 ml and in PET bottles of 296 ml, 510 ml, 1.5 litre, 1.75 litre and 3.020 litre.
