= Beed Cola =

Peruvian soft drink

- Type: Cola
- Manufacturer: Embotelladora del Oriente S.R.L.
- Origin: Peru
- Introduced: February 25, 2003; 23 years ago
- Variants: Cola, strawberry
- Related products: Perú Cola, Crush Naranja

Beed Cola is a Peruvian range of soft drinks trademarked on February 25, 2003 by Industria Embotelladora del Oriente S.R.L. Beed Cola is produced in Pucallpa, Peru and sold throughout the Ucayali Region. Beed Cola is sold in 362 ml glass bottles. The slogan for Beed Cola is "La Riquisima!" (The Most Delicious!).

== See also ==
- Concordia, a direct competitive brand.
