= Cassinelli =

Cassinelli may refer to:

== People ==
- Claudio Cassinelli (1938-1985), Italian actor
- Dave Casinelli (1940-1987), American football player
- Lindsay Casinelli, Venezuelan journalist
- Roberto Cassinelli, Italian politician
- Dolores Cassinelli, (1888-1984), American film actress
- Ricardo Belmont Cassinelli, Peruvian media owner

== Other ==
- Enrique Cassinelli and Sons, Peruvian soft-drink producer
- Cassinelli (soft drink), Peruvian soft-drink
- Cassinelli Pasta, defunct pasta company formerly based in Astoria, Queens
