= Corporación Lindley S.A. =

Peruvian company

Arca Continental Lindley S.A.
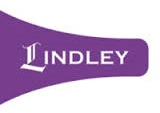
- Industry: Beverage
- Founded: 1910; 116 years ago, Lima, Peru
- Founders: José R. Lindley, Martha Stoppanie de Lindley
- Headquarters: Jr. Cajamarca 371, Lima 25, Lima, Peru,
- Area served: Peru
- Key people: Johnny Lindley Suárez (President)
- Products: Inca Kola, Coca-Cola, Sprite, Fanta, Crush, Kola Inglesa, San Luis, Frugos, Powerade, Burn, Aquarius,
- Parent: Arca Continental
- Website: Lindley.pe

Arca Continental Lindley S.A. (formerly known as Corporación José R. Lindley S.A. and the Lindley Corporation) is a Peruvian company involved in the manufacturing, distribution and marketing of nonalcoholic beverages and the official bottler and distributor of all Coca-Cola products in Peru. The company was formed by the 2015 integration of the operations of Mexico-based Arca Continental and Peru-based Lindley S.A. The Lindley Corporation is best known for its creation and marketing of Inca Kola, the number one selling soft drink in Peru. The Lindley Corporation, located in the historic District of Lima, Peru, is also a major promoter of plastic recycling programs in Peru. Its president is Johnny Lindley Suarez.

== History ==
=== Beginning of a family company ===
In 1910, a young English couple, Don José Robinson Lindley and Martha Stoppanie de Lindley, immigrated to Peru and settled in the Rimac District of Lima. Starting in 1910, the Lindley's company operated in a 200 square meter building as Santa Rosa of José R. Lindley and Sons S.A. (Santa Rosa de José R. Lindley e Hijos S.A.). In 1918, they purchased their first semi-automatic bottling system which increased productivity dramatically. By 1928, their production facility had increased to 1,400 square meters, and all new equipment had been purchased.

=== Birth and growth of a national icon ===
In 1935, the corporation launched the Inca Kola brand to mark the fourth centenary of the founding of the city of Lima. In 1945, the Lindley Corporation expanded its distribution and marketing nationwide in Peru—the Inca Kola brand has completely covered the entire country since 1972. In 1983, the company launched PET plastic bottles in 1 liter, 1.5 liter, and 2 liters and in 1996 the Lindley Corporation became fully automated and computerized with the purchase of a German bottling system called Krones.

From 1957 to 1973 other companies were formed to perform support functions for the Lindley Corporation. Distribución, Transporte y Almacenaje S.A. (Distral S.A.) was incorporated on February 1, 1957, to handle the distribution and transportation of soft drinks, fruit juices and nectars. Inmobiliaria Lintab S.A. was incorporated on February 22, 1960, to manage the real estate holdings of the company. Frutos del País S.A. was incorporated on May 25, 1973, and is dedicated to the manufacturing and marketing of juices, nectars and fruit pulp.

In 1996 the various companies were combined into one. On December 4, 1996, Inmobiliaria Lintab SA, absorbed by merger the following companies: José R. Lindley e Hijos S.A., Frutos del País S.A., Distral S.A. and Sabores Perú S.A., the industrial activities branch of the group. In 1997, Inmobiliaria Lintab S.A. changed its name to the Corporación José R. Lindley S.A. In 2001, the Lindley Corporation acquired the entire common stock with voting rights representing the capital stock of EPSA and Embotelladora La Selva S.A.

=== Joining forces with the competition ===
In 1999, the Lindley Corporation developed a strategic alliance with The Coca-Cola Company. In 2000 the Lindley Corporation entered the Coca-Cola system, but with the market divided between competing bottler Embotelladora Latinoamericana SA (ELSA) and the Lindley Corporation, the situation generated significant operating inefficiencies by both companies competing to reach the same customers through the same channels.

In 2004, the Lindley Corporation acquired Embotelladora Latinoamericana SA (ELSA) through shareholdings enabling the company to optimize the use of resources, improve commercial performance of the system, and create a stronger competitive position. In the September 2005 General Meeting of the Lindley Corporation, the board decided to absorb the entire estate of ELSA, thus dissolving ELSA. Following this decision Corporacion Jose R. Lindley took over the franchise exclusively with The Coca-Cola Company for the production, distribution and sale of Coca-Cola soft drink products that were held by ELSA.

=== Corporación José R. Lindley S.A. today ===
From 2006 to 2009 the Lindley Corporation continued to lead the recovery of soft drink industry's value, reaching prices of 2.4 nuevo soles (PEN) per liter, similar to 1999 levels. Significant investment has been made in marketing, packaging operations, point of sale programs, the introduction of cooling equipment in retail stores, and successful launches of new products. The Lindley Corporation achieved 65.7 percent market share and 73 percent value share in 2009. In 2010, the Lindley Corporation celebrated 100 years in the soft drink business.

== Products ==
=== Carbonated beverages ===
- Inca Kola: the top selling soft drink in Peru. Inca Kola was created in 1935 by the Lindley family. Inca Kola is sold in 237 ml, 1 litre, 1.5 litre, and 2 litre glass bottles; and in 500 ml, 1.5 litre, 2.25 litre and 3 litre PET bottles by the Lindley Corporation under franchise contract with Corporación Inca Kola Perú SRL.
- Inca Kola No Sugar: the no-sugar version of Inca Kola is sold in 410 ml, 500 ml and 1.5 litre PET bottles by the Lindley Corporation under franchise contract with Corporación Inca Kola Perú SRL.
- Coca-Cola: is sold in 237 ml, 1 litre, 1.5 litre, and 2 litre glass bottles; and in 500 ml, 1.5 litre, 2.25 litre and 3 litre PET bottles.
- Coca-Cola No Sugar: the no-sugar version of Coca-Cola is sold in 500 ml PET bottles.
- Sprite: the lemon-lime soft drink is marketed to the youth of Peru in 237 ml glass bottles and 500 ml and 1.5 litre PET bottles.
- Sprite Zero: the no-calorie version of Sprite is sold in 500 ml and 2.25 litre PET bottles.
- Fanta: a youth-oriented orange drink marketed in Peru in 192 ml glass bottles, and 500 ml and 2.25 litre PET bottles.
- Fanta Kola Inglesa: a strong-flavored red soft drink sold in 500 ml PET bottles.
- Crush: the bold flavored orange drink marketed in Peru in 500 ml 1.5 litre and 3 litre PET bottles.
- Canada Dry (soft drink): Coca-Cola brand

=== Non-Carbonated Beverages ===
- San Luis: bottled mineral water available (carbonated or non-carbonated) in 500 ml, 1 litre, 2.5 litre and 7 litre PET bottles. It is also available in large 20 litre cartons and 30 litre dispensers.
- Frugos: nectar in the flavors of Durazno (peach), Mango, Manzana (apple), and Naranja (orange) in 150 ml and 235 ml Tetra Pak juice boxes and 1 litre cartons.
- Powerade: a sports drink in the flavors of Lima-Limón (lemon-lime), Mandarina (orange), Maracuyá (passion fruit), Mora Azul (blueberry), Multi-Frutas (red fruit punch), and Piña (pineapple) in 437 ml PET bottles.
- Burn: an energy drink sold in 310 ml aluminum cans.
- Aquarius: fruit flavored water in the flavors Manzana (apple), Pera (pear), Naranja (orange) and Piña (pineapple) available in 500 ml] PET bottles.

=== Former products ===
- Bimbo (soft drink): first introduced in 1962, was made in the following flavors: Frutilla (strawberry), Piña (pineapple), Lima Limón (lemon-lime), Manzana (apple), Mandarina (orange) and Cola.
- Bonaqua (flavored water): Coca-Cola product no longer available in Peru.
- San Antonio (bottled water).
- Dasani (flavored water): Coca-Cola brand.
- Coca-Cola Light: Coca-Cola no-calories version of the classic beverage.

== See also ==
- Ajegroup - a direct competitor of Corporación José R. Lindley S.A.
- AmBev - a direct competitor of Corporación José R. Lindley S.A.
- Embotelladora Don Jorge S.A.C. - a direct competitor of Corporación José R. Lindley S.A.
- Pepsico Inc Sucursal Del Peru - a direct competitor of Corporación José R. Lindley S.A.
- List of beverage companies of Peru
