= Sporade =

Peruvian sports drink brand

- Type: Sports drink
- Manufacturer: Ajegroup
- Origin: Peru
- Introduced: 2004
- Variants: lemon, mandarin orange, passion fruit, tropical, blueberry

Sporade is a Peruvian brand of sports drink owned by Ajegroup. Launched in 2004, it has successfully wrestled market share from Gatorade thanks to its lower price.

== See also ==
- Kola Real
