= Nutrisoda =

American soda brand

- Company type: Private
- Industry: Beverage/CSD
- Founded: 2002
- Founder: Joe and Lesley Heron
- Headquarters: Schaumburg, Illinois, USA
- Products: Nutrient-enhanced sodas
- Parent: PepsiAmericas
- Website: nutrisoda.com

Nutrisoda (formerly known as airforce Nutrisoda) was the brand name of a nutrient-enhanced soda sold in the United States by the Ardea Beverage Company.

Nutrisoda contained zero sugar, zero sodium, zero aspartame, and zero to ten calories.

== Origins ==
Nutrisoda was created in 2002 by Joe Heron, previously the Senior Vice President of Novartis Medical Nutrition, and his wife, Lesley Heron.

In January 2006, Ardea Beverage Co. was purchased by PepsiAmericas, the second largest Pepsi bottler in the world.
