= Super Supau =

Taiwanese sports drink brand

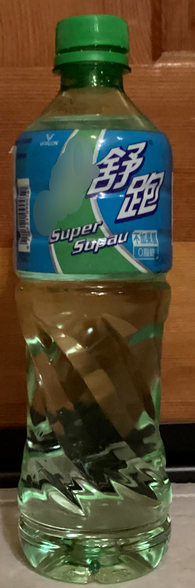
- Type: Sports Drink
- Manufacturer: Vitalon Foods Company
- Origin: Taiwan, East Asia; Southeast Asia
- Introduced: 1981; 44 years ago
- Colour: Clear/Translucent
- Website: www.supau.com.tw (Traditional Chinese)

Super Supau (Chinese: 舒跑; pinyin: Shūpǎo) is a Taiwanese sports drink, manufactured by the Vitalon company since 1981. The company is based in the Gong Ye district of Taichung. The drink competes against Pocari Sweat and Aquarius, two brands introduced from Japan, as well as Heysong's Fin. Super Supau contains potassium, sodium, magnesium, calcium, electrolyte, vitamin C and Bifidobacterium. Super Supau is the best-selling sports drink brand in Taiwan.

== See also ==
- Aquarius
- Pocari Sweat
