= Don Jorge =

Peruvian beverage company

Embotelladora Don Jorge S.A.C.
- Company type: Private
- Industry: Beverage
- Founded: 1947; 79 years ago
- Headquarters: Lima, Peru
- Key people: Jorge Panizo Mariategui
- Products: Agua Vida, Perú Cola, Isaac Kola and Climax
- Website: www.donjorge.com.pe

Embotelladora Don Jorge S.A.C. is a corporation involved in the manufacturing, distribution and marketing of non-alcoholic and alcoholic beverages based in Lima, Peru. Its headquarters are located in the San Miguel District, Lima.

== History ==
In 1947 José Panizo Vargas, a successful entrepreneur in Ica Peru, gained a franchise to bottle Coca-Cola for the Department of Ica. For 26 years, under the management of his son Jorge Panizo Mariategui, Coca-Cola was the market leader in the area.

In 1973 the military government threatened to ban the Coca-Cola brand from the Peruvian market. Under these circumstances Jorge Panizo Mariategui negotiated with Don Isaac Lindley, at the request of the latter, the franchise of Inca Kola in the Department of Ica. For 27 years the company bottled and distributed Inca Kola in the area, once again managing to obtain market leadership.

In 2000 Inca Kola was absorbed by The Coca-Cola Company. Coca-Cola negotiated for several months with its bottlers, and Embotelladora Don Jorge decided the conditions that Coca-Cola sought to impose on bottlers to continue with the franchise were unacceptable. With 53 years experience in the sector, Jorge Panizo Mariategui decided that the company would launch its own brands from its plant in Ica to supply the large domestic market.

In 2002 Embotelladora Don Jorge S.A.C. operations began in Lima with a large investment in locale, machinery and infrastructure. The company produces Peru Cola and Isaac Kola among other brands. In 2003, Embotelladora Don Jorge S.A.C. decided to take the lead in creating more nutritional and functional products through the addition of soluble fiber in its soft drinks.

== Products ==
=== Carbonated Beverages ===
- Isaac Kola: a soft drink (created to compete with Inca Kola) sold in 500 ml glass bottles and PET bottles available in 500 ml, 1.500 litres, 2.200 litres and 3.300 litres and is marketed alongside sister brand Perú Cola as a fifth flavor.
- Perú Cola: a soft drink in four flavors, original cola (created to compete with Coca-Cola and Kola Real), Fresa (strawberry), Lima-Limón (lemon-lime) and Naranja (orange), sold in 500 ml glass bottles (cola, strawberry and lemon-lime) and PET bottles available in 500 ml, 1.500 litres, 2.200 litres and 3.300 litres.

=== Non-Carbonated Beverages ===
- Chicha Morada: a soft drink in the flavor of chicha morada, a popular South American drink made from purple corn, sold in 500 ml PET bottles.
- Click: a citrus fruit punch sold in 500 ml and 2 litre PET bottles.

=== Bottled Water ===
- Agua Vida Con Gas: a carbonated mineral water sold in PET bottles available in 300 ml, 625 ml, 2.5 litres and 5 litres.
- Agua Vida Sin Gas: a non-carbonated mineral water sold in PET bottles available in 300 ml, 625 ml, 2.5 litres, 5 litres and 22 litre cartons.
- Agua Metro: mineral water (available carbonated and non-carbonated) produced for the Metro supermarket chain sold in PET bottles available in 625 ml, 2.5 litres, and 20 litre cartons.
- Agua Wong: mineral water (available carbonated and non-carbonated) produced for the Wong supermarket chain sold in PET bottles available in 625 ml, 2.5 litres, and 20 litre cartons.

=== Alcoholic Beverages ===
- Climax: a carbonated ready-to-drink alcoholic beverage marketed like a soft drink in three flavors, Durazno (peach), Lima-Limón (lemon-lime) and Maracuyá (passion fruit), in 2 litre PET bottles.

== See also ==
- Perú Cola - a product of Embotelladora Don Jorge S.A.C.
- Isaac Kola - a product of Embotelladora Don Jorge S.A.C.
- Ajegroup - a direct competitor of Embotelladora Don Jorge S.A.C.
- AmBev - a direct competitor of Embotelladora Don Jorge S.A.C.
- Corporación José R. Lindley S.A. - a direct competitor of Embotelladora Don Jorge S.A.C.
- Pepsico Inc Sucursal Del Peru - a direct competitor of Embotelladora Don Jorge S.A.C.
- List of beverage companies of Peru
