= Senn's Grist Mill-Blacksmith Shop-Orange Crush Bottling Plant =

- U.S. National Register of Historic Places
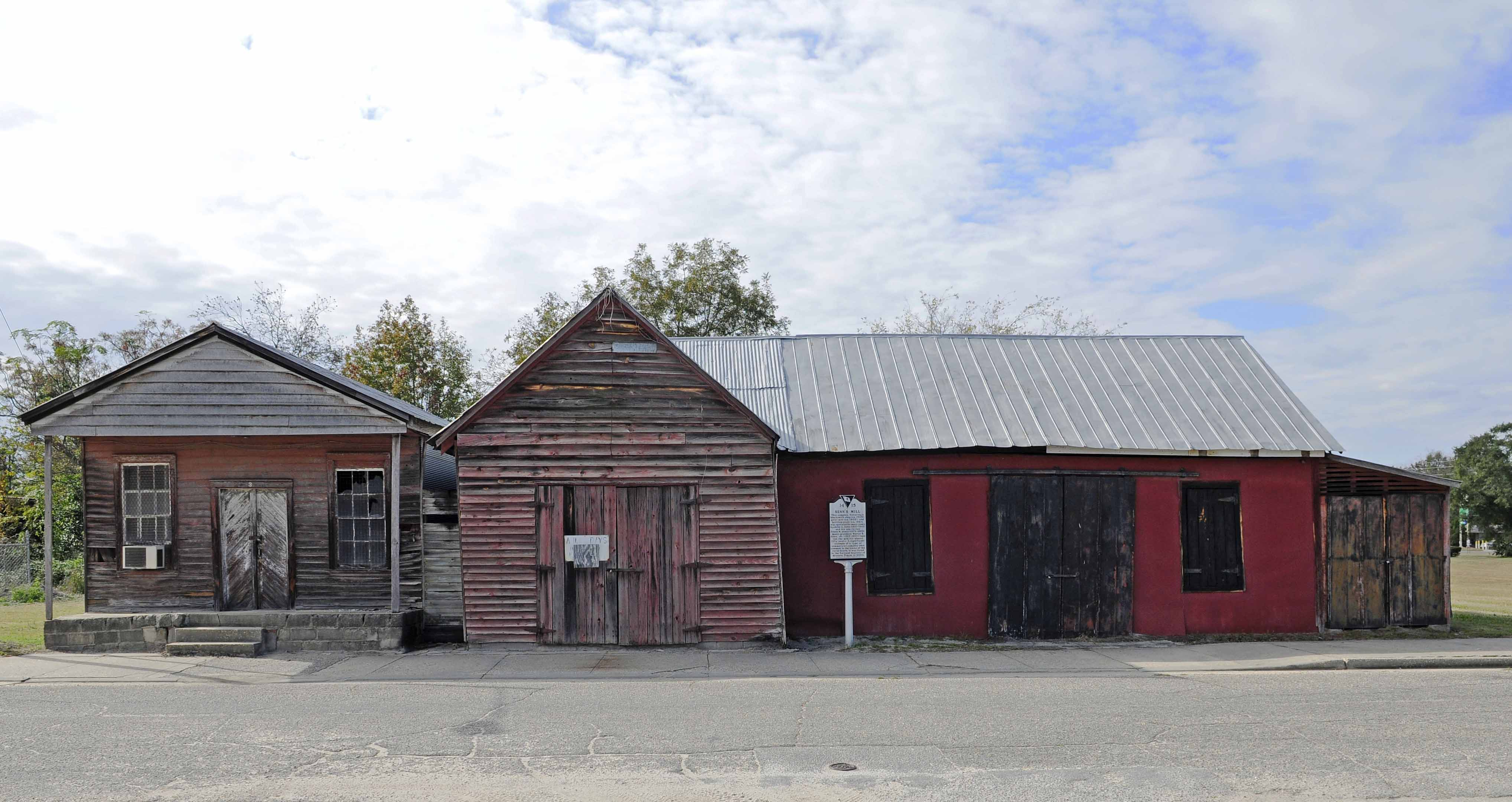
- Senn's Grist Mill-Blacksmith Shop-Orange Crush Bottling Plant, November 2012

- Location within South Carolina Location within the United States
- Location: 3 Cantey St., Summerton, South Carolina
- Coordinates: 33°36′32″N 80°21′5″W
- Area: less than one acre
- Built: c. 1905, 1921
- NRHP reference No.: 00000290
- Added to NRHP: March 24, 2000

Senn's Grist Mill-Blacksmith Shop-Orange Crush Bottling Plant is a complex of historic commercial buildings located at Summerton, Clarendon County, South Carolina. The complex consists of three interconnected early-20th century buildings of similar size and construction, built by John G. Senn Sr., and family. The grist mill was built about 1905, is an example of small independent grist mills that were commonplace in rural communities across the South. The blacksmith shop and bottling plant, built about 1921, are typical of early-20th century light industrial buildings. The complex supplied the local agricultural sector with essential goods and services for nearly a century.

It was listed in the National Register of Historic Places in 1994. The bottling plant building was used by Senn's brother-in-law, Frank W. Josey, to supply Orange Crush to local stores starting around 1921. It ceased operations in 1947 or 1948 due to more stringent state sanitary regulations. The blacksmith shop closed in 1939 as automobiles reduced demand. The mill was inherited by Walter B. Senn Jr., in the 1940s, and ran until shortly before his death in 1999.
