= Pocari Sweat =

Sports drink

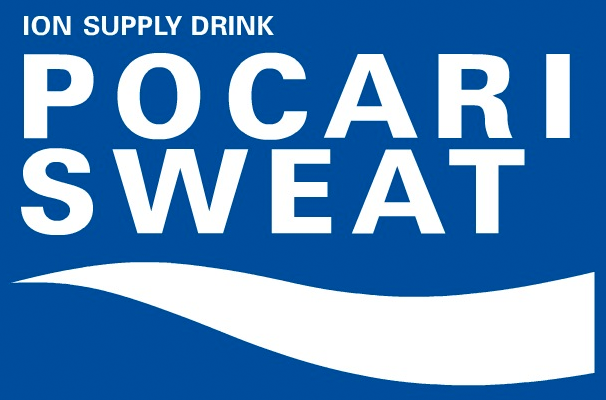

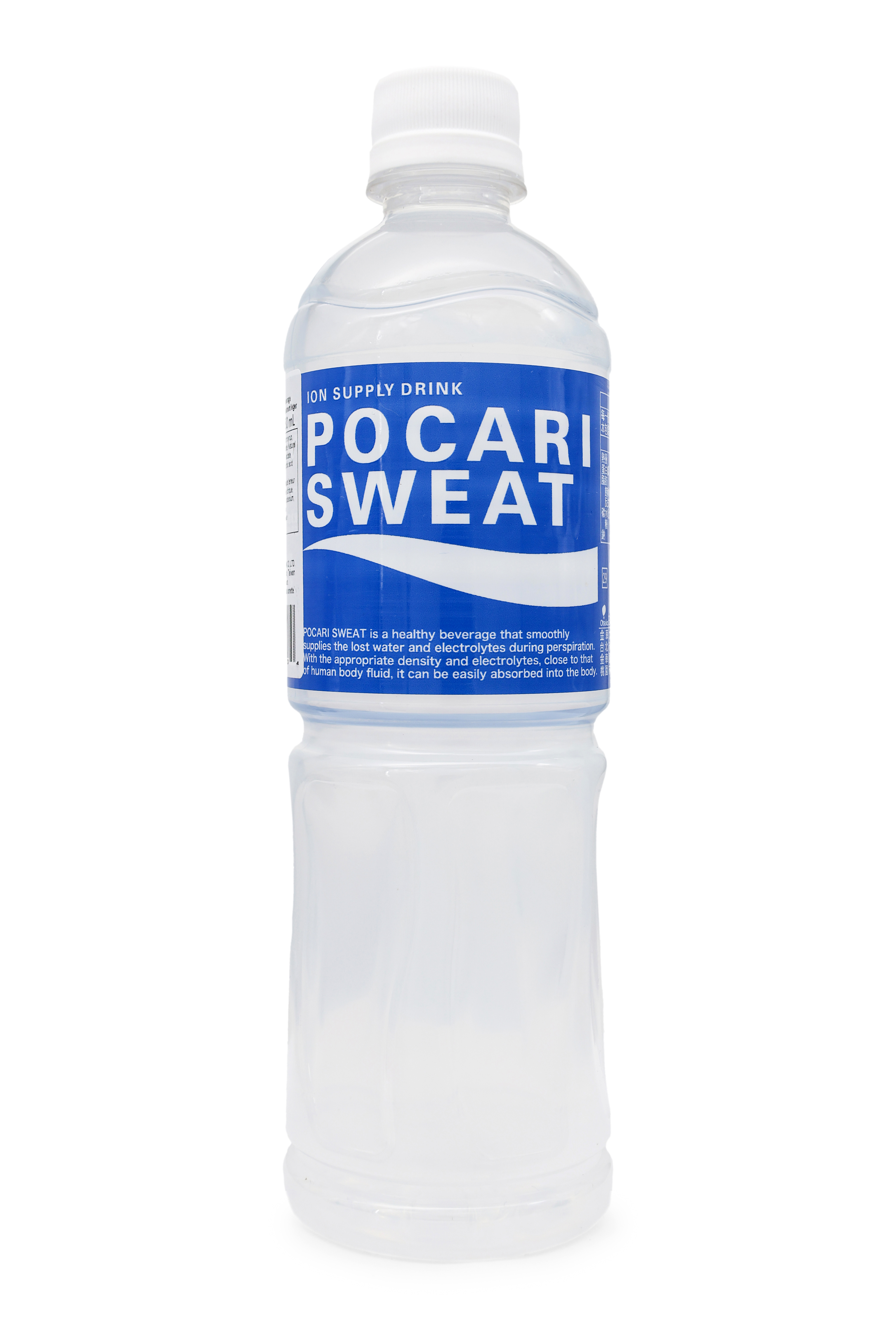
- Product type: Sports drink
- Produced by: Otsuka Pharmaceutical
- Country: Japan
- Introduced: 1980; 46 years ago
- Markets: East Asia; Southeast Asia; Middle East; Mexico; United States; India
- Website: https://trypocari.com/

Pocari Sweat (Japanese: ポカリスエット, Pokari Suetto) is a Japanese sports drink, manufactured by Otsuka Pharmaceutical. It was launched in 1980, and is sold across Asia and the Middle East; it is also available in Australia, Mexico and the United States.

Pocari Sweat is a mild-tasting, non-carbonated sweet beverage and is advertised as an "ion supply drink", "refreshment water" (1992), "body request" (1999), and "electrolyte beverage" in Thailand. It has a mild grapefruit flavor with little aftertaste. Ingredients listed are sugar (Japan-processed), high fructose corn syrup, fruit juice, salt / acidulant, fragrance, potassium chloride, calcium lactate, flavor enhancer (amino acids), magnesium chloride, antioxidants (vitamin C). It is sold in aluminium cans, PET bottles, and as a powder for mixing with water. An artificially sweetened version with reduced sugar called Pocari Sweat Ion Water (ポカリスエット イオンウォーター, Pokari Suetto Ion Wōtā) is also sold.

== History ==
Pocari Sweat was launched in 1980 in Japan by Rokuro Harima, an Otsuka Pharmaceutical employee who came up with the idea after observing a doctor drink IV solution to rehydrate. Harima had taken a trip to the hospital after getting diarrhea during a business trip to Mexico, and wondered if a drink could provide both the water and nutrients he needed to recover.

Wary of Gatorade's dominance of the United States market, Pocari Sweat focused on expansion into Asia and the Middle East. In 1982, it was exported overseas for the first time, to Hong Kong and Taiwan, followed the next year by Singapore, Bahrain, Oman and Saudi Arabia. By the mid-1990s, Pocari Sweat had become Japan's first domestically produced non-alcoholic drink to ship over $1 billion in product.

== Name ==
The name Pocari Sweat was chosen by the manufacturers for the purpose of marketing the product as a sports drink in Japan, where English words are used differently. It was largely derived from the notion of what it is intended to supply to the drinker: all of the nutrients and electrolytes lost when sweating. The first part of the name, Pocari, has no meaning but was intended to sound refreshing.

== Marketing ==
Pocari Sweat has maintained the same blue-and-white color scheme since its inception in 1980. Originally sold in a 245 mL can, it has been sold primarily in bottle form since 1990.

Otsuka began a targeted marketing campaign in Indonesia after an outbreak of dengue fever in 2010, promoting the drink to prevent dehydration, a common symptom of the disease.

On 15 May 2014, Pocari Sweat started a project to send a "dream capsule" to the Moon with the help of Astroscale. The capsule was made in the same shape as a Pocari Sweat can and filled with Pocari Sweat powder. It was intended to be the first commercial product advertised on the Moon. Originally scheduled to launch on a SpaceX Falcon 9 rocket in October 2015, it was flown on the Astrobotic Technology lander Peregrine that failed to reach the Moon and burned in the Earth's atmosphere in January 2024.

The company also has done extensive advertising through anime. The technical director for the film Your Name helped create a 2019 anime-styled advertisement. Pocari Sweat released a January 2021 special episode of the Cells at Work! anime promoting the drink as a way to prevent heat stroke.

== See also ==
- Aquarius (a similar beverage manufactured by The Coca-Cola Company)
- Calpis
- Oronamin C Drink
- Lipovitan
- Foreign branding
- 100plus
- Super Supau
