= The Pepsi Bottling Group =

Defunct bottler of Pepsi beverages

The Pepsi Bottling Group, Inc.
- Type: Public
- Industry: Beverages
- Founded: March 1999
- Founder: PepsiCo
- Defunct: February 26, 2010
- Fate: Purchased by PepsiCo; Merged with PepsiAmericas to form Pepsi Beverages Company
- Headquarters: Somers, New York, U.S.
- Number of locations: 648
- Area served: USA, Canada, Greece, Mexico, Russia, Spain, Turkey
- Key people: Eric J. Foss, president and CEO (Began work and completed Mountain Dew Code Red, 1993)
- Products: Pepsi; Mountain Dew; Sierra Mist; Mug Root Beer; Slice; Sobe; Aquafina; Tropicana; Dole; Crush (for Dr. Pepper Snapple Group); Frappuccino (for Starbucks)
- Services: Bottling
- Revenue: ▲US$13.2 Billion (FY 2009)
- Operating income: ▲US$1.05 Billion (FY 2009)
- Net income: ▲US$612 Million (FY 2009)
- Total assets: ▲US$13.6 Billion (FY 2009)
- Total equity: ▲US$2.42 Billion (FY 2009)
- Number of employees: 69,100
- Parent: PepsiCo 41.7% share
- Subsidiaries: Bottling Group, LLC
- Website: pbg.com

The Pepsi Bottling Group, Inc. was the world's largest bottler of Pepsi-Cola beverages. PBG sales of Pepsi-Cola beverages accounted for more than one-half of the Pepsi-Cola beverages sold in the United States and Canada and about 40 percent worldwide. PBG had the exclusive right to manufacture, sell and distribute Pepsi-Cola beverages in all or a portion of 43 states, the District of Columbia, nine Canadian provinces, Spain, Greece, Russia, Turkey and Mexico. Approximately 70 percent of PBG's volume was sold in the United States and Canada. Pepsi Bottling Group was based in Somers, New York.

On August 4, 2009, The Pepsi Bottling Group and another major Pepsi bottler, PepsiAmericas, were purchased by PepsiCo, headquartered in Purchase, New York. The purchases were completed on February 26, 2010, forming a wholly owned PepsiCo subsidiary, the Pepsi Beverages Company (PBC).

== History ==
On September 30, 2008, The Pepsi Bottling Group Inc. said that third-quarter earnings fell to $231 million, or $1.06 a share, compared to $260 million, or $1.12 a share, in the same period a year prior. The year-prior period included a 14-cent-a-share gain due to a tax benefit and restructuring charges. Revenue rose 2% to $3.8 billion. Eric Foss, chief executive officer, said that soft consumer demand in the US had spread during the third quarter "across geographies" leading to sales volume declines in Europe and Mexico. In Europe, total volume of cases sold fell 6 per cent. He cited economic factors ranging from economic volatility and the impact of food inflation in Russia, to the effects of the housing slump in Spain. In Mexico, where case volumes were down 9 per cent, he noted that cash remittances from the US had fallen to their lowest level in over a decade, leading to declines in consumer confidence.

On October 6, 2008, Eric Foss was promoted to chairman of the board.

On October 14, 2008, PepsiCo announced that it would be cutting jobs and closing factories to give it some "breathing room" to navigate the volatility that has permeated all corners of the global economy. The company said it planned to eliminate 3,300 jobs and shutter six plants in an effort to save $1.2 billion over three years. It planned to use the savings primarily to revive lagging U.S. soft drink sales.

On November 19, 2008, The Pepsi Bottling Group announced it was cutting costs as part of a multiyear restructuring program to improve efficiencies in its global operations. Under its "Structured to Succeed" program, 3,150 employees, or 4.5% of its workers, would lose their jobs. About 750 jobs were expected to be cut in Pepsi Bottling's U.S. and Canada operations, including the closure of four facilities in the U.S. In Europe, operation streamlining would impact 200 jobs, while in Mexico, the closure of three plants, 30 distribution centers and 700 routes would impact 2,200 jobs.

On February 10, 2009, The Pepsi Bottling Group Inc. reported a net loss of $271 million in the fourth quarter and projected 2009 earnings below analysts' expectations. This includes a net after-tax charge of $336 million, due to restructuring, and a non-cash asset impairment charge related primarily to PBG's business in Mexico. Volume fell 7% in North America and 6% in Europe.

On February 19, 2009, PepsiCo announced a multiyear distribution agreement with Rockstar Energy Drink. Rockstar was to be distributed by The Pepsi Bottling Group, PepsiAmericas, Pepsi Bottling Ventures and other independent Pepsi-Cola bottlers in most of the United States and all of Canada.

== Management ==
- Eric J. Foss, chairman and chief executive officer (2008 Forbes ranked #265 for executive pay: $1,730,000)
- President, PBG North America
- Richard Glover, president, PBG Canada
- Yiannis Petrides, president, PBG Europe
- Brent J. Franks, senior vice president, worldwide operations
- Eric Llopis, senior vice president, chief strategy officer
- Ronald R.R. Neugold, vice president, foodservice
- Tom Lardieri, vice president and controller
- Mary Winn Settino, vice president, investor and public relations
