= Agroindustrial Casa Grande =

Peru-based agricultural company

Empresa Agroindustrial Casa Grande S.A.A.
- Company type: Public company
- Traded as: BVL: CASAGRC1
- Industry: Agribusiness
- Founded: (1996)
- Headquarters: La Libertad, Peru
- Key people: Jorge Columbo Rodriguez Rodriguez (Chairman); John Anthony Carty Chirinos(CEO)
- Products: Sugar; Molasses bagasse Alcohol
- Revenue: ▲US$ 79.5 Million (2008)
- Number of employees: 3,261
- Parent: Grupo Glória
- Website: www.grupogloria.com/casagrandeE.html

Casa Grande is a Peru-based company principally engaged in the agricultural sector. Its activities include the cultivation, growing, processing, industrialization and sale of sugar cane and its derivatives.

The company is also involved in the production and distribution of alcohol, sugar cane, pulp, molasses, bagasse and ethanol.

The Company is a member of Grupo Gloria, a group which comprises a number of companies active in the food processing, agricultural and industrial sectors. The Company's majority shareholder is Corporacion Azucarera del Peru SA, with 57.09% of its interests. The company was formerly state-owned. Earlier, it had been a cooperative.
