= PepsiAmericas =

Bottler of Pepsi beverages

PepsiAmericas, Inc.
- Type: Public
- Traded as: (As Illinois Central Industries and then IC Industries) NYSE: IC (until 1988) (As Whitman Corporation) NYSE: WH (1988-2000)
- Industry: Beverage distribution
- Headquarters: Minneapolis, Minnesota, United States
- Key people: Robert C. Pohlad, Chairman & CEO
- Products: Pepsi; Sunny Delight; Hawaiian Punch; Lipton; Dr Pepper (for Dr Pepper Snapple Group); Country Time Lemonade (for Dr Pepper Snapple Group); Crush (for Dr Pepper Snapple Group); Frappuccino (for Starbucks)
- Revenue: $4.5 billion USD (2007)
- Website: www.pepsiamericas.com

PepsiAmericas, Inc. was the world's second-largest bottler of Pepsi-Cola products, under contract with product owner PepsiCo. PepsiAmericas also held contracts to produce beverages for Dr Pepper Snapple Group and smaller regional brands. PepsiAmericas had 19 bottling plants in the United States and had a presence in 11 countries in Central/Eastern Europe and 5 countries in the Caribbean. PepsiAmericas was based in Minneapolis, Minnesota. PepsiCo acquired full ownership of the company in 2010, along with its largest bottler, Pepsi Bottling Group, combining the two into a wholly owned subsidiary, Pepsi Beverages Company.

== History ==
PepsiAmericas, Inc. was founded in 1851 as the Illinois Central Railroad. It later diversified into other industries after reorganizing as the holding company Illinois Central Industries in 1962. In 1972 it purchased Pepsi-Cola General Bottlers Inc. of Chicago, becoming the second largest Pepsi bottler in the U.S. It later changed its name to IC Industries in 1975 and Whitman Corp. in 1988 after spinning off the Illinois Central Railroad into a separate company.

The original PepsiAmericas, based in Minneapolis, was founded in 1986 as a consolidation of regional Pepsi bottlers in the northern Midwest. It also included territory in the Caribbean. It became the third-largest Pepsi bottler in the U.S. In 2000, Whitman Corp. acquired the original PepsiAmericas, and assumed its name and headquarters.

By early 2009, PepsiCo held a 41.1% stake in the PepsiAmericas. On April 20, 2009, PepsiCo offered to buy the remaining portion of PepsiAmericas, at an offer of $23.27 – or $11.64 plus 0.223 PepsiCo shares – in exchange for each PepsiAmericas share. In August 2009, PepsiCo also made an offer for Pepsi Bottling Group, the world's largest bottler of Pepsi-Cola products. On February 26, 2010, after regulatory review, PepsiCo's acquisitions of the two bottling companies was completed, forming a new, wholly owned subsidiary, Pepsi Beverages Company.
