= La Ibérica =

Peruvian chocolate company

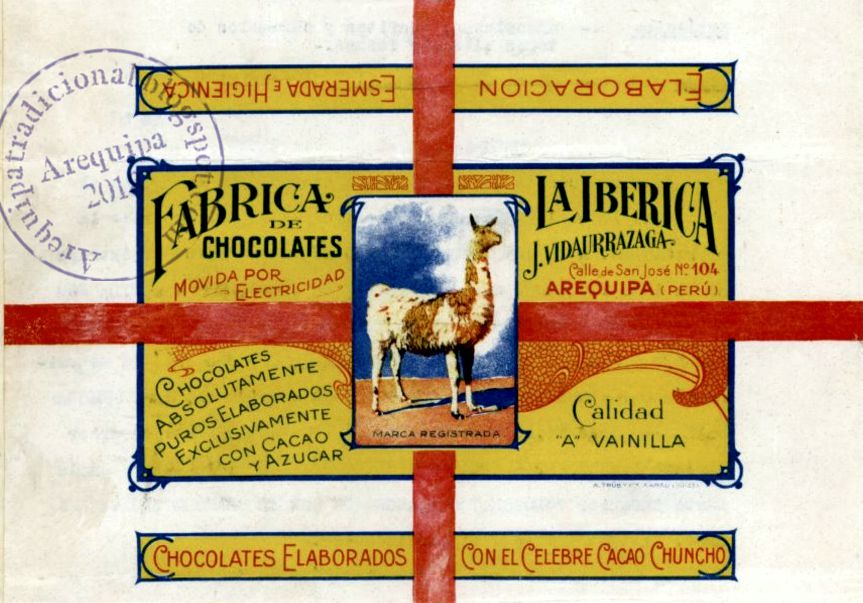
Logo

La Ibérica is a traditional chocolate factory in the city of Arequipa, Peru, founded in 1909. The factory provides chocolate in all of its stores in Peru and abroad too.
