= Cassinelli Pasta =

Defunct pasta company

Coordinates: 40°46′26″N 73°54′45″W

- Company type: Private
- Founded: 1912
- Defunct: 2023
- Fate: Dissolved
- Headquarters: Astoria, New York
- Services: Pasta factory

Cassinelli Pasta was a pasta company based on 23rd Avenue in Astoria, Queens. The company was founded in Manhattan in 1912 by Peter and Adele Cassinelli, and operated for 101 years before being closed down in 2023. It was also based in New Jersey for a short time, but moved to Astoria permanently in the 1930s, which at the time was heavily Italian-American. A combination shop and pasta factory that made fresh daily pasta, it was named the best fresh pasta in New York City by New York magazine in 2001, and delivered frequently to upscale Manhattan restaurants. The business was run for numerous years by Tony Bonfigli and Nella Costella, who had purchased the business from Adele in 1972. After the death of Costella in 2022, Bonfigli decided to retire, resulting in the shop's permanent closure.

== History ==
The company was founded in Manhattan in 1912 by Peter and Adele Cassinelli. At one point, the company moved to New Jersey, then finally to the location in Astoria in the 1930s. In 1972, the duo of Tony Bonfigli and Nella Costella purchased the shop from Adele. By 2018, the store made from 3,000 to 4,000 pounds (1,400 to 1,800 kg) of pasta per week, and sold more than three dozen varieties, including mushroom ravioli. The shop had a staff of 8 people, was closed briefly around noontime for a lunch break, and were known for their unorthodox hours overall, being closed on Sundays and Mondays, such that it was not obvious they did have business hours if one did not see them open. While the owners' original plan was to pass the shop to Tony's son, Robert, and Nella's son-in-law, Aldo Riccoboni, following their retirement, this plan fell through when Riccoboni died in 2011, an event which caused her much grief. Nella died herself in 2022 without having retired, causing Bonfigli to decide to shut down the shop entirely a year later.

== Reception ==
In 2001, New York magazine described the pasta from Cassinelli as better than "dried out" pasta from Manhattan shops, noting that it was made daily, and described their ravioli and manicotti as "delicate" and "soft-shelled".
