= Minera IRL =

Minera IRL Limited
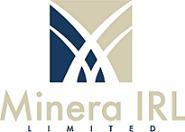
- Company type: Public
- Traded as: BVL: MIRL; CSE: MIRL
- Industry: Mining
- Founded: 2000
- Headquarters: Lima, Peru
- Products: Precious metals
- Number of employees: 196
- Website: Company site

Minera IRL is a Peruvian mining company founded in 2000 by Investor Resources Ltd, an Australian technical and financial consultancy. The company is engaged in the mining, development and exploration of precious metals.

Minera IRL operates the Corihuarmi Gold Mine in central Peru and is developing the Ollachea gold Project, in the southern Puno region.

In February 2017, the Company reported its shares would begin trading on the Canadian Securities Exchange.

In March 2017, the Company reported it had been advised by Corporacion Financiera de Desarrollo that the mandate to exclusively structure senior debt financing for the Company's Ollachea gold project in Puno, Peru had been revoked.
