= Maple Energy =

Maple Energy plc
- Company type: Public
- Traded as: BVL: MPLE; LSE: MPLE
- Industry: Energy
- Founded: (1986)
- Headquarters: Lima, Peru
- Products: Oil & Natural Gas
- Website: www.maple-energy.com

Maple Energy is an integrated independent energy company with assets and operations in Peru. Indigenous people from Peru's Amazon took over 9 of its oil wells in 2012.
