= Concordia (drink) =

Peruvian range of soft drinks

- Type: Soft-drink
- Manufacturer: PepsiCo
- Country of origin: Peru
- Variants: (current) orange, strawberry, pineapple
- Related products: Kola Real, Perú Cola, Crush Naranja

Concordia is a Peruvian range of soft drinks, first sold and produced in the "Norte Chico" ("Little North") region of Peru (Huacho, Huaral, Huaraz, etc.). Concordia can be found in flavors like Strawberry, Pineapple and Orange. Discontinued flavors include Apple and Non-alcoholic Champagne. Concordia was the first bottling plant in Peru to have a PET bottle blowing machine, installed in 1992. Concordia is now a brand of the PepsiCo company.

== See also ==
- List of soft drinks by country
