= Fanta Kola Inglesa =

Peruvian soft drink

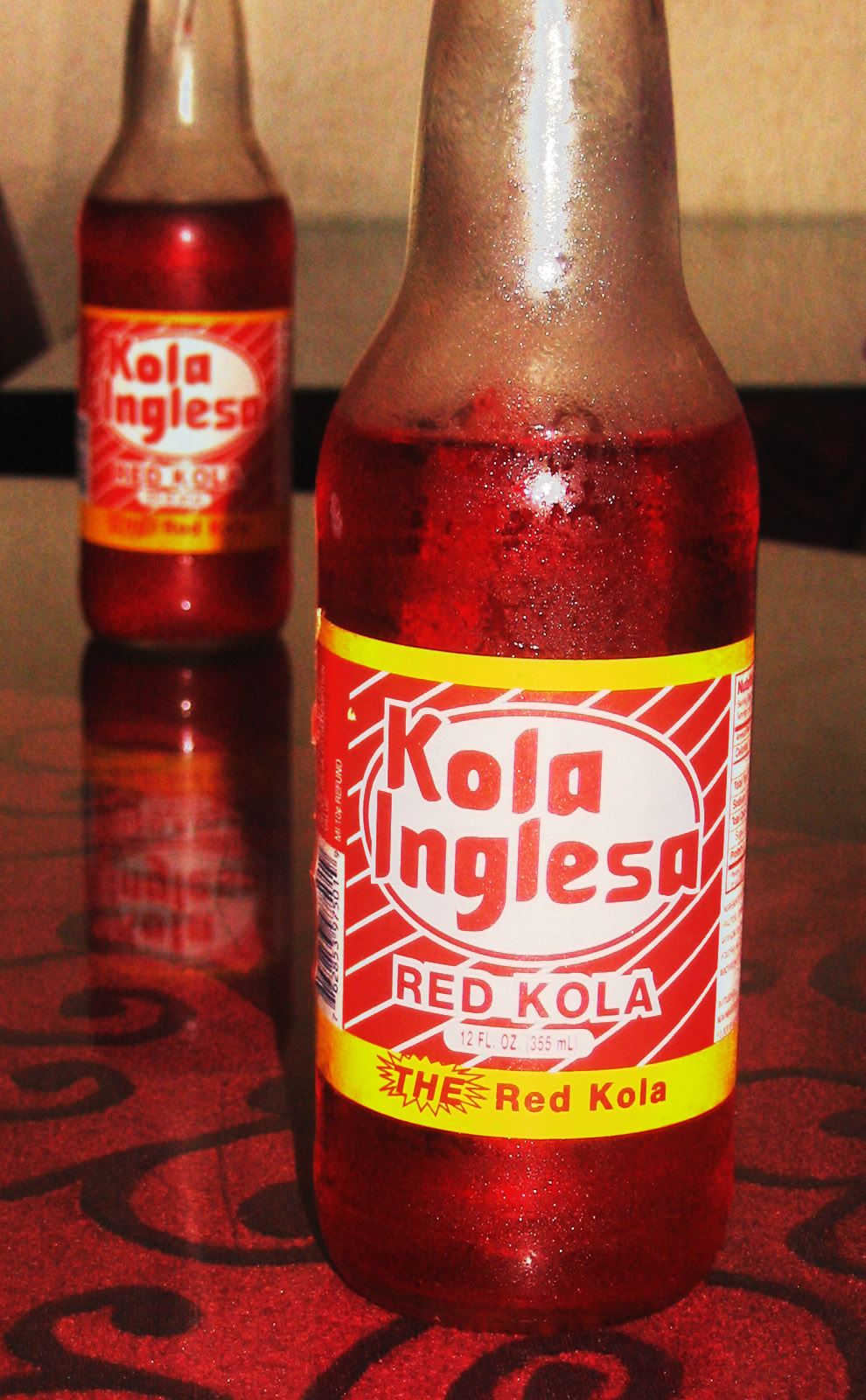
- Type: Soft drink
- Manufacturer: The Coca-Cola Company
- Origin: Peru
- Related products: Inka Cola

Fanta Kola Inglesa (Spanish for "English Cola") is a Peruvian soft drink. It is red in color and cherry-strawberry flavor. Introduced in 1912, Kola Inglesa currently comes in several sizes including a 3-liter bottle and a 500ml bottle. The drink is popular across Peru as in some Latin American markets in the United States. The brand was first owned by Manuel A. Ventura, who created the drink for the Peruvian market. In 1971 the recipe was sold to Mr. Enrique Heredia Alarcón (Pepsi's bottler in Peru at the time). It was during this time that the drink became highly popular among Peruvians. In 1997, the brand was sold to The Coca-Cola Company along with Agua San Luis for over $30 million USD. In 2013 the name changed to Fanta Kola Inglesa.

== See also ==
- List of Coca-Cola brands
- Fanta
- Red Kola
