= Cielos del Oriente =

Peruvian charter airline

Cielos del Oriente was a Peruvian charter airline. The airline's hub is situated at the Cad. FAP Guillermo del Castillo Paredes Airport in Tarapoto. They operated charter flights throughout the jungle. The airline ceased operations in 2014.

== Accidents ==
On July 27, 2002 a Cessna T210N crashed in Bolognesi. The captain and two passengers had minor injuries and three passengers were uninjured.

== Destinations ==
- Bolognesi
- Iquitos
- Pucallpa
- Tarapoto Hub
- Yurimaguas

== Fleet ==
- Cessna 206
- Cessna 210
