= Viva Backus =

Peruvian soft drink brand

Viva (Backus)
- Type: Soft drink
- Manufacturer: Backus and Johnston
- Origin: Peru
- Related products: Inca Kola, Isaac Kola, Oro, Triple Kola

Viva is a Peruvian brand of soft drink owned by Backus and Johnston and sold in Perú. Viva is a rival product to Inca Kola sharing the same characteristics such as the yellow color. Viva is sold in PET bottles of 500 mL.

In 2014, Viva Backus was licensed in perpetuity to the Coca-Cola Company.

== See also ==
- Inca Kola – direct competitive brand
- Isaac Kola – direct competitive brand
- List of soft drinks by country
- Oro – direct competitive brand
- Triple Kola – direct competitive brand
