= Empresa Agroindustrial Pomalca =

Coordinates: 6°46′10″S 79°46′24″W

Empresa Agroindustrial Pomalca S.A.A.
- Company type: Public
- Traded as: BVL: POMALCC1
- Industry: Agribusiness
- Founded: 1996
- Headquarters: Chiclayo, Peru
- Key people: Adán Coronel Bravo (Chairman); Victor Antonio Becerril Rodriguez (CEO)
- Products: sugar, molasses, bagasse
- Revenue: ▼PEN 102 million (2012)
- Operating income: ▲PEN 18.341 million (2012)
- Net income: ▲PEN 18.301 million (2012)
- Number of employees: 3,000
- Parent: Grupo Oviedo
- Website: www.pomalca.com.pe

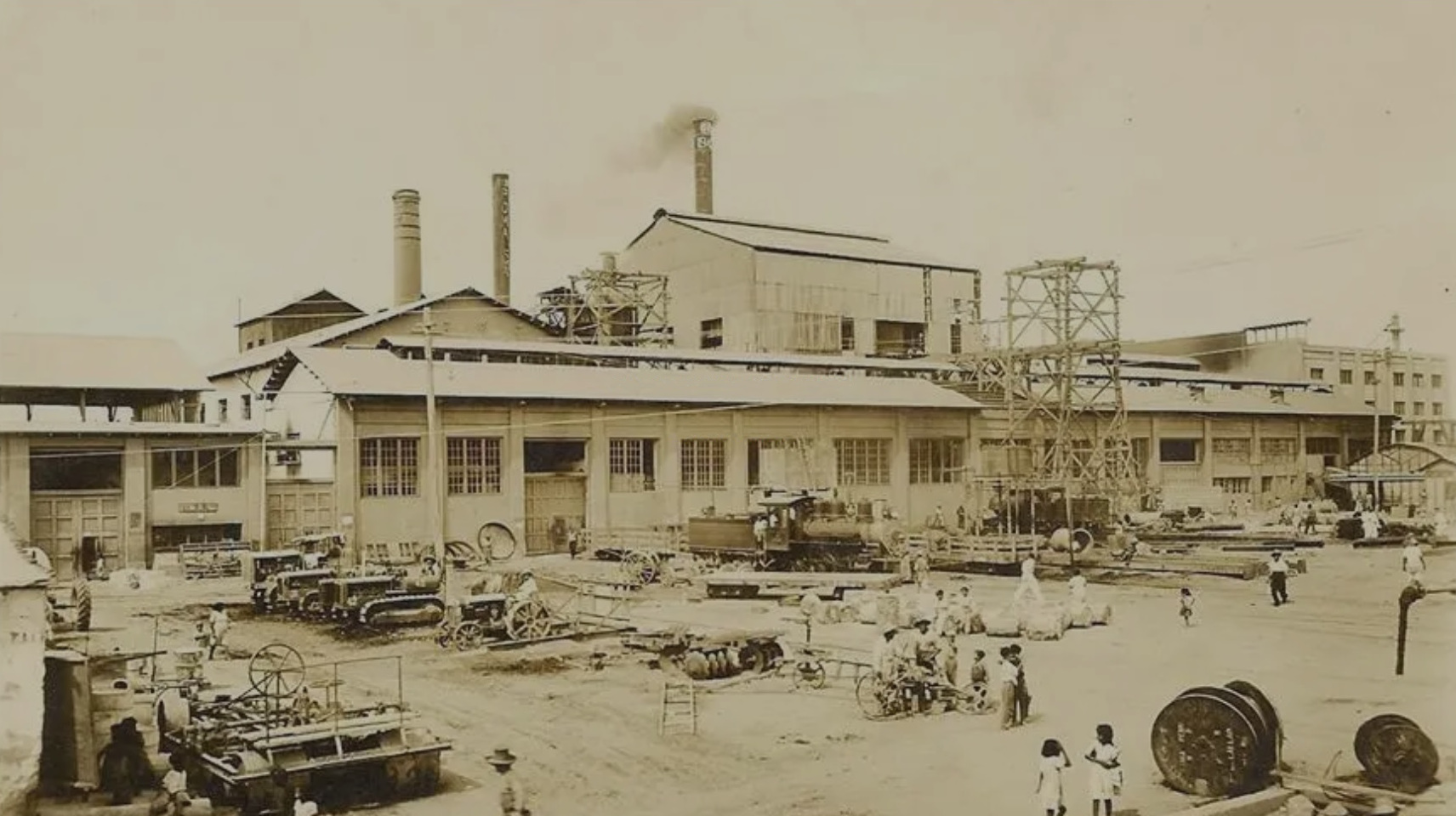
Pomalca Estate, Factory, Chiclayo, Peru

Empresa Agroindustrial Pomalca is a leading agribusiness company based in Chiclayo, Peru. It is one of the country's major sugar producers. The company has more than 15,000 hectares (37,000 acres) in sugar cane for production of sugar, molasses, and bagasse, in addition to other agricultural exports from its factory in coastal Lambayeque Region, Peru. It is an exporter of refined sugar to the United States.
