= Super Epsa =

Former supermarket chain in Lima, Peru

Super Epsa is the former name of a supermarket chain in Lima, Peru, which was founded in 1953 by Aldo E. Olcese (b. December 29, 1922 in Lima) as Super Market S.A. It was the first occurrence of an American-style supermarket in Peru.

Olcese's father was a hard working Italian-Genoese immigrant. He went to the United States in 1946 to study Business Administration at the University of Texas at Austin and he graduated in 1950. During his lifetime, as a student in the United States, Olcese was impressed with one Super Market close to his residence where he frequently shopped together with his wife, and since then he thought it would be a great idea to carry out the same kind of self-service Super Market in Peru.

In 1953, and for the first time in the Peruvian History, the first supermarket, Super Espa was officially opened in Av Larco 670, Miraflores, with great success. After 20 years in the supermarket business, the company opened a total of 14 supermarkets scattered throughout the Peruvian capital. Super Epsa was expropriated by military dictator Juan Velasco Alvarado. Even after the dictatorship ended in 1980, it was never returned to its rightful owners. After years of mismanagement by the state, the company filed for bankruptcy in 1982.
