= Perú Cola =

Peruvian soft drink

- Type: Cola
- Manufacturer: Embotelladora Don Jorge S.A.C.
- Country of origin: Peru
- Introduced: 2002; 23 years ago
- Variants: cola, orange, strawberry, lemon
- Related products: Isaac Kola, Kola Real, Inca Kola

Perú Cola is a Peruvian range of soft drinks. Perú Cola is a brand of the Embotelladora Don Jorge S.A.C. company, a former bottler of Coca-Cola and later Inca Kola products. Perú Cola was introduced in Peru in 2002 after the take-over of Inca Kola by the Coca-Cola Company. Perú Cola is sold in glass bottles of 500 ml and PET bottles of 500 ml, 1.5 liter, 2.2 liter and 3.3 liter.

In May 2018, Ajegroup (Añaños family) bought the Grupo Perú Cola which owns the Perú Cola brand.

== Product promotions ==
In September 2010, Embotelladora Don Jorge S.A.C. announced its promotion of the popular América Televisión show Al Fondo Hay Sitio on labels of Perú Cola and Isaac Kola. The labels of Perú Cola featured caricatures of 14 different characters from the television series on the front of the 500 ml and 1.5 liter PET bottles. The larger sizes (2.2 liters and 3.3 liters) had groups of characters on the larger size labels. In addition to the labels, there were prizes consisting of 50 different collectable stickers featuring 16 different characters from the show (with similar caricatures printed on the labels) available on the inside of the peel-off labels—one each on the 500 ml and 1.5 liter bottles. The 2.2 liter bottles came with two stickers, and the 3.3 liter bottles had three stickers. The promotion officially ended 15 November 2010, but the labels and stickers were available on store shelves after that time.

In January 2011, Embotelladora Don Jorge S.A.C. introduced a second promotion for the television show Al Fondo Hay Sitio. It featured a second set of sticker-tattoos (decals, unlike the larger format square stickers from the first series) with new artwork with various caricatures of characters from the television series on 500 ml PET bottles of Perú Cola and Isaac Kola. This promotion did not include different collectable labels with different characters as in the first promotion. The label indicated that an album for the stickers could be ordered from a website for the promotion.

== See also ==
- Kola Real — a direct competitive brand.
- Crush Naranja — a direct competitive brand.
- Concordia — a direct competitive brand.
- Isaac Kola — sister product marketed alongside Perú Cola.
