= Oro (drink) =

Peruvian brand of soft drink

- Type: Soft drink
- Manufacturer: Ajegroup
- Origin: Peru
- Related products: Inca Kola, Isaac Kola, Triple Kola

Oro is a Peruvian brand of soft drink owned by the Ajegroup and sold in Perú, Ecuador and Venezuela. Oro is a rival product to Inca Kola sharing the same characteristics such as the yellow color. Oro is sold in PET bottles of 525 ml.

== See also ==
- Inca Kola - direct competitive brand
- Isaac Kola - direct competitive brand
- List of soft drinks by country
- Triple Kola - direct competitive brand
- Viva - direct competitive brand
