= Modasa (bus manufacturer) =

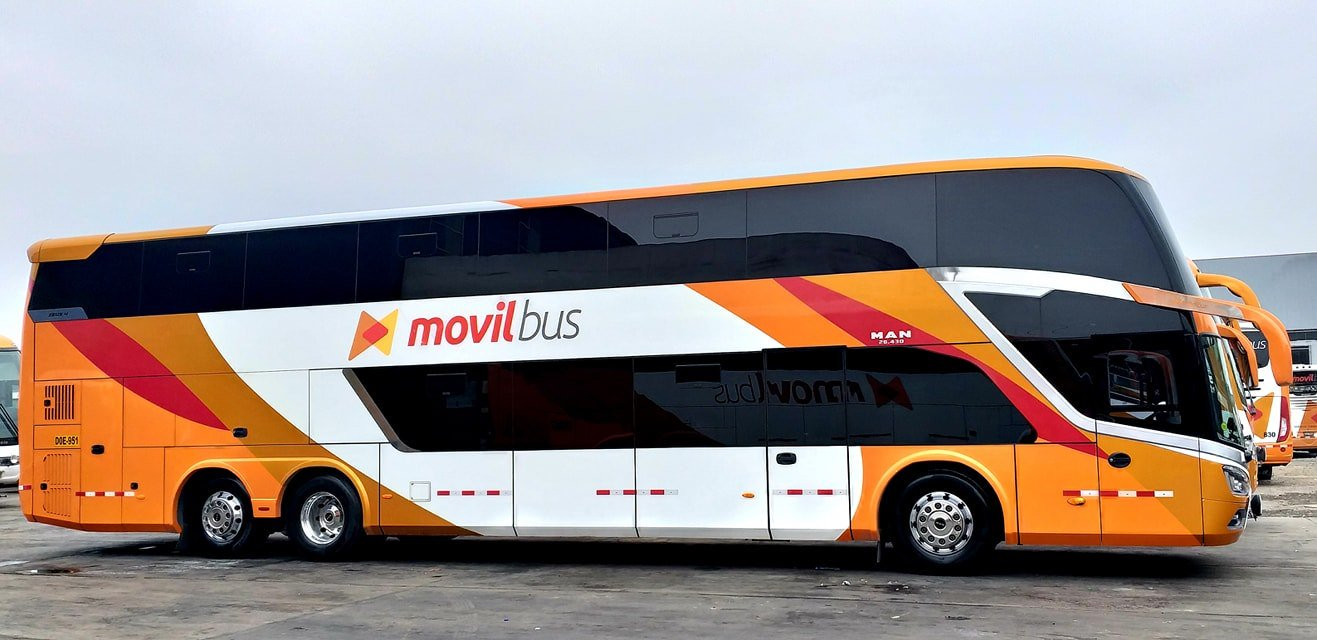
Bus Modasa Zeus 4

MODASA (an abbreviation of Motores Diesel Andinos S.A), is a Peruvian bus manufacturer, located in Ate District. MODASA products include buses, such as coach buses and school buses and tourist bus es, and cars, including pick-up trucks. MODASA provides a service converting automobiles to run off of natural gas. The company also produces generators and mobile generators.
