= Wimmers Soft Drinks =

Australian soft drink brand

- Type: Private
- Industry: Drink industry
- Founded: 1910 (116 years ago) in Nambour, Australia
- Founder: Alfred and Frank Wimmer
- Headquarters: Australia
- Area served: Queensland; Northern New South Wales
- Products: Drink mixers, Soft drink
- Owner: Peter and Toni Lavin
- Parent: Noosa Beverages Pty Ltd
- Website: noosabeverages.com.au

Wimmers is an Australian soft drink brand founded in Nambour, Australia in 1910 by Alfred Wimmer and his son Frank. Wimmers is currently owned by Noosa Beverages Pty Ltd, which is currently owned by the Lavin family.

== See also ==
- List of soft drinks by country
