= Leading Brands =

North American beverage company

Leading Brands, Inc.
- Company type: Public
- Traded as: Nasdaq: LBIX
- Industry: Beverage Industry
- Founded: 1986; 40 years ago
- Headquarters: Vancouver, Canada
- Products: Bottled & Canned Beverage
- Website: leadingbrandsinc.com/news.html

Leading Brands, Inc. is a fully integrated beverage company in North America. Its operations include a coast-to-coast distribution network, large variety of brands, production of private label products and beverage distribution. The company is a publicly traded company on NASDAQ under the symbol "LBIX".

Leading Brands Incorporation was formerly named Brio Industries Inc., and changed its name in October 1999. The company started its earliest business in 1986. Its headquarters is now in Vancouver, Canada.

The ticker symbol for Leading Brands Incorporation is "LBIX".

== Operations ==
The operations of Leading Brands Incorporation include a coast-to-coast distribution network, a portfolio of proprietary brands and licensed products. The company also produces private label products, distributes beverage products, and is a co-packer for major international beverage companies.

As of August 9, 2018, the company announced an acquisition of Liquid Media Group Ltd and a name change to that of the acquired company.

== Awards ==
On October 3, 2013, the company's Neurogenesis HAPPY WATER(R) brand has been named one of the "Top 10 Most Innovative Products for 2013" by The Canadian Federation of Independent Grocers (CFIG).
