= Drinko =

Lebanese beverage company

Drinko is a Lebanese beverage manufacturer. It started production mid-2006, and is still operational.

== Products ==
Drinko currently owns two brand names:

- Six Degrees
- Fridge is a carbonated beverage manufactured by Drinko, a Lebanese beverage Manufacturer. It was introduced to the world market by the year 2006. Currently Fridge comes in 14 flavors.

=== Six Degrees (beverage) ===
Six Degrees is an absinthe-based carbonated ready to drink beverage that contains 18% alc. volume. It is manufactured by Drinko, a Lebanese firm. Six Degrees was launched in 2010. It is currently found in four flavors: Absinthe Classic, Cranberry, Citrus, and Tropic.

== Export ==
Drinko's products are exported to the following countries:

- Syria
- Iraq
- Jordan
- Palestinian Authorities
- UAE
- Iran
- France
- Canada
- Australia
- Germany
- Sweden
