= Enrique Cassinelli and Sons =

Enrique Cassinelli and Sons S.A.C.
- Type: Private
- Industry: Beverage
- Founded: 1910
- Headquarters: Trujillo, Peru
- Key people: Fernando Ulises Murgia Graham
- Products: Cassinelli, Liber
- Website: www.enriquecassinelli.com.pe

Enrique Cassinelli and Sons is a Peruvian producer of soft drinks and juices. It is located in Trujillo in the La Libertad Region in Peru. Cassinelli and Sons is owner of the Cassinelli brand of soft drinks and the Liber brand of juices.

== History ==
The company was founded in 1910 by Don Enrique Cassinelli Chiappe and four of his brothers. In 1960 the company changed its name to Enrique Cassinelli and Sons. From 1995 to 2004 the company produced the famous Inca Kola.

== See also ==
- List of beverage companies of Peru
