= Isaac Kola =

Peruvian soft drink

- Type: Soft drink
- Manufacturer: Embotelladora Don Jorge S.A.C.
- Origin: Peru
- Introduced: 2002; 24 years ago
- Related products: Inca Kola, Oro, Triple Kola, Viva

Isaac Kola is a Peruvian soft drink. It is brand of the Embotelladora Don Jorge S.A.C. company, a former bottler of Coca-Cola and later Inca Kola products. It was introduced in Peru in 2002 as a rival product to Inca Kola after the take-over of Inca Kola by the Coca-Cola Company. It is sold in glass and PET bottles of 500 mL (17 US fl oz) and PET bottles of 1.5 L (1.6 US qt), 2.200 L (2.325 US qt) and 3.300 L (3.487 US qt).

== Product promotions ==
In September 2010, Embotelladora Don Jorge S.A.C. announced its promotion of the popular América Televisión show Al Fondo Hay Sitio ("There's Room in the Back") on labels of Perú Cola and Isaac Kola. The labels of Isaac Kola featured colorful caricatures of 14 different characters from the television series on the front of the 500 mL and 1.5 L PET bottles. The larger sizes had groups of characters on the larger size labels. There were 50 different collectible stickers featuring 16 different characters from the show (with similar caricatures used on the front) available on the inside of the peel-off labels—one each on the 500 mL and 1.5 litre bottles. The 2.200 L bottles came with two stickers, and the 3.300 L bottles had three stickers. The promotion officially ended November 15, 2010, but the labels and stickers were available on store shelves after that time. The television commercial for the promotion publicized an interactive website for the promotion.

In January 2011, Embotelladora Don Jorge S.A.C. introduced a second promotion for the television show Al Fondo Hay Sitio. It featured a second set of sticker-tattoos (decals, unlike the larger format square stickers from the first series) with new artwork with various caricatures of characters from the television series on 1/2 liter PET bottles of Perú Cola and Isaac Kola. This promotion did not include different collectible labels with different characters as in the first promotion. The label indicated that an album for the stickers could be ordered from a website for the promotion.

== See also ==
- Inca Kola - direct competitive brand
- List of soft drinks by country
- Oro - direct competitive brand
- Triple Kola - direct competitive brand
- Viva - direct competitive brand
- Perú Cola - sister brand marketed alongside Isaac Kola
