= Aquarius (drink) =

Mineral sports drinks

- Type: Sports drink Functional water Flavored water (Latin America)
- Manufacturer: The Coca-Cola Company
- Origin: Japan
- Introduced: 1983; 43 years ago
- Related products: Powerade, Gatorade.

Aquarius (アクエリアス) is an American-owned Japanese brand of sports drink manufactured by The Coca-Cola Company. It was developed in 1978, and was first marketed in 1983 in Japan as a grapefruit-flavored sports drink, in response to Pocari Sweat, a brand of sports drink that debuted in 1980 in that country.

Aquarius was introduced in Spain and Portugal in 1991, and was the official drink of the 1992 Summer Olympics in Barcelona, Spain; the 1994 Winter Olympics in Lillehammer, Norway; the 2008 Summer Olympics in Beijing, China; the 2016 Summer Olympics in Rio de Janeiro, Brazil; and the 2020 Summer Olympics in Tokyo. The brand has been heavily marketed by giving away free samples at sporting events.

In 2011 it was marketed in Spain, Japan, Argentina, Belgium, Bosnia and Herzegovina, Chile, China (including Hong Kong and Macau), France, Indonesia, Luxembourg, Morocco, the Netherlands, Peru, Portugal, Serbia, Singapore, Switzerland, Taiwan and Thailand. The majority of its consumers are non-athletes. In 2019 it became available in the United Kingdom. Aquarius is available in the following flavors: Citrus Blend, Grapefruit, Lemon, Orange, Watermelon, Red Peach, Blueberry and Tropical. The availability of these flavors changes from country to country.

In Malaysia and the Maldives, bottled water was also marketed under the Aquarius brand.

== See also ==
- Cool Ridge
- Pump
- List of bottled water brands
