= Inca Kola =

Soft drink

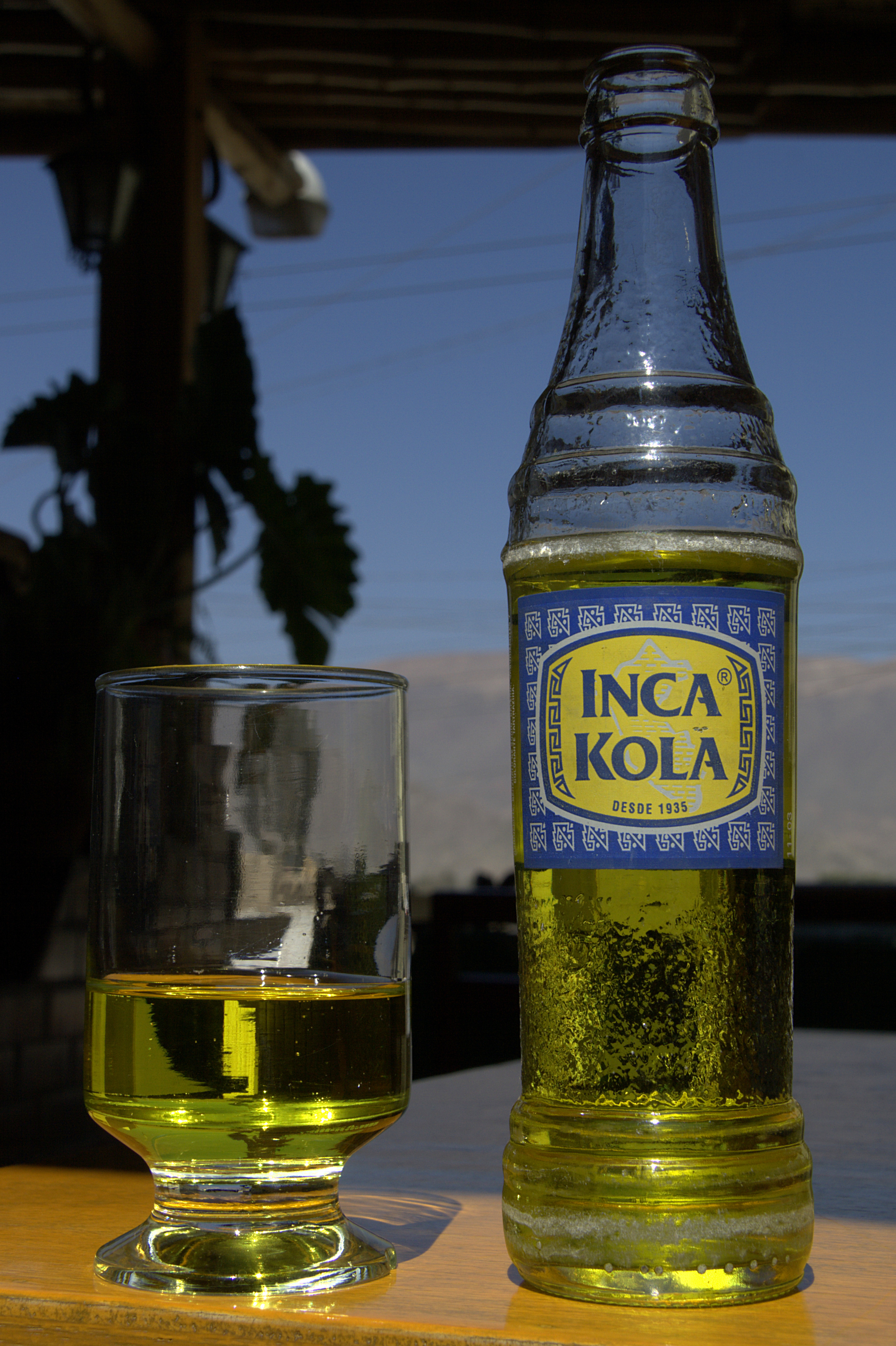
- Type: Soft drink
- Manufacturer: Corporación José R. Lindley S.A.
- Origin: Peru
- Introduced: 1935; 91 years ago
- Related products: Coca-Cola, Kola Real
- Website: www.coca-cola.com/pe/es/brands/inca-kola

Inca Kola, also known as Golden Kola in international advertising, is a soft drink invented in Peru in 1935 by British immigrant Joseph Robinson Lindley. Its main ingredient is lemon verbena. Both lemon verbena and lemongrass are known as hierbaluisa in Spanish, but they are not the same species. Americans describe its flavor as bubblegum and cream soda; it is also classified as a champagne cola.

The Inca Kola trademark is owned by The Coca-Cola Company outside of Peru. In Peru, the Inca Kola trademark is owned by Corporación Inca Kola Perú S.A.. This company has been a joint venture between the Coca-Cola Company and the Lindley family since 1999s. Lindley family was the former sole owner of Corporación Inca Kola Perú S.A. and Corporación Lindley S.A.

Inca Kola is sold in bottles and cans featuring Inca motif in parts of South America, North America and Europe.

== History ==
In 1910, an immigrant English family founded a small bottling company under their family name Lindley in Lima's neighborhoods Rímac. The company was officially incorporated in Peru in 1928 as Corporación José R. Lindley S.A., Joseph R. Lindley became its first General Manager.

By the early 1930s, the company had a line of ten flavors of soda including Orange Squash, Lemon Squash, Champagne Kola, and Cola Rosada. In 1935, the 400th anniversary of the founding of Lima, Lindely launched Inca Kola, the flavor was derived from Lemon Verbena (Spanish: Verbena de Indias, Hierbaluisa or Cedrón). Inca Kola is made from thirteen special plant extracts. The company launched "Inca Kola" under the slogan "There is only one Inca Kola and it's like no other" (Inca Kola sólo hay una y no se parece a ninguna).

By 1945, Inca Kola had become a bestseller in the Lima market thanks to extensive advertising campaigns. To appeal to Peruvian nationalism, the company positioned Inca Kola as a traditional Peruvian drink. The bottles were adorned with iconic national and indigenous iconography. This design led Inca Kola's sales surpass Coca-Cola and Pepsi in Peru.

By 1970, Inca Kola had achieved a 38% market share in Peru, surpassing all other carbonated beverages in the country, becoming the representative of "Peru's Drink" (La Bebida del Perú). In the late 1970s and early 1980s, Inca Kola's common logo featured the slogan "Made of National Flavor!" (¡De Sabor Nacional!), later changed to "The taste of Peru" (El Sabor del Perú).

On January 22th, 2009, Inca Kola partnered with Nestlé's Peruvian ice cream brand D'Onofrio, to launch an Inca Kola flavored ice pop.

In the United States, Inca Kola is manufactured by the Coca-Cola company and sold in supermarkets in 2-liter (68 U.S. fl oz) bottles, cans, and individual bottles.

Inca Kola also sells a diet version.

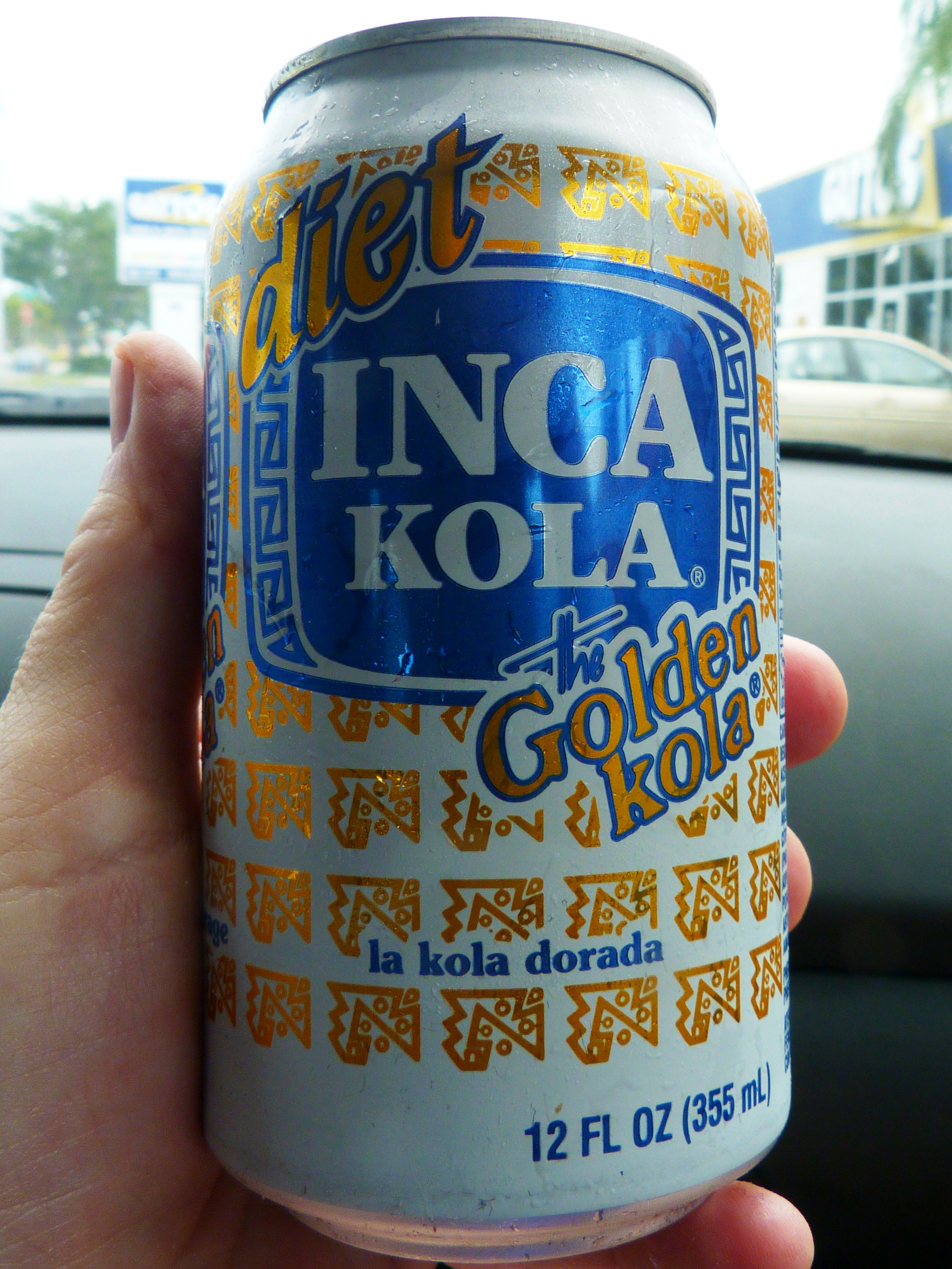
A can of Diet Inca Kola

== Competition ==
In 1995, Coca-Cola held a 32% share of the Peruvian soft drink market, while Inca Kola held 32.9%. Some Peruvian fast-food chains began adding Inca Kola to their menus, leading to an increase in its market share. The Peruvian fast-food chain Bembos switched from serving Coca-Cola to Inca Kola in 1995. McDonald's also began to serve Inca Kola at its Peruvian locations in 1995s. At that time, Coca-Cola did not own the Inca Kola brand (at the time, the only place in the world where Coca-Cola agreed to such an arrangement).

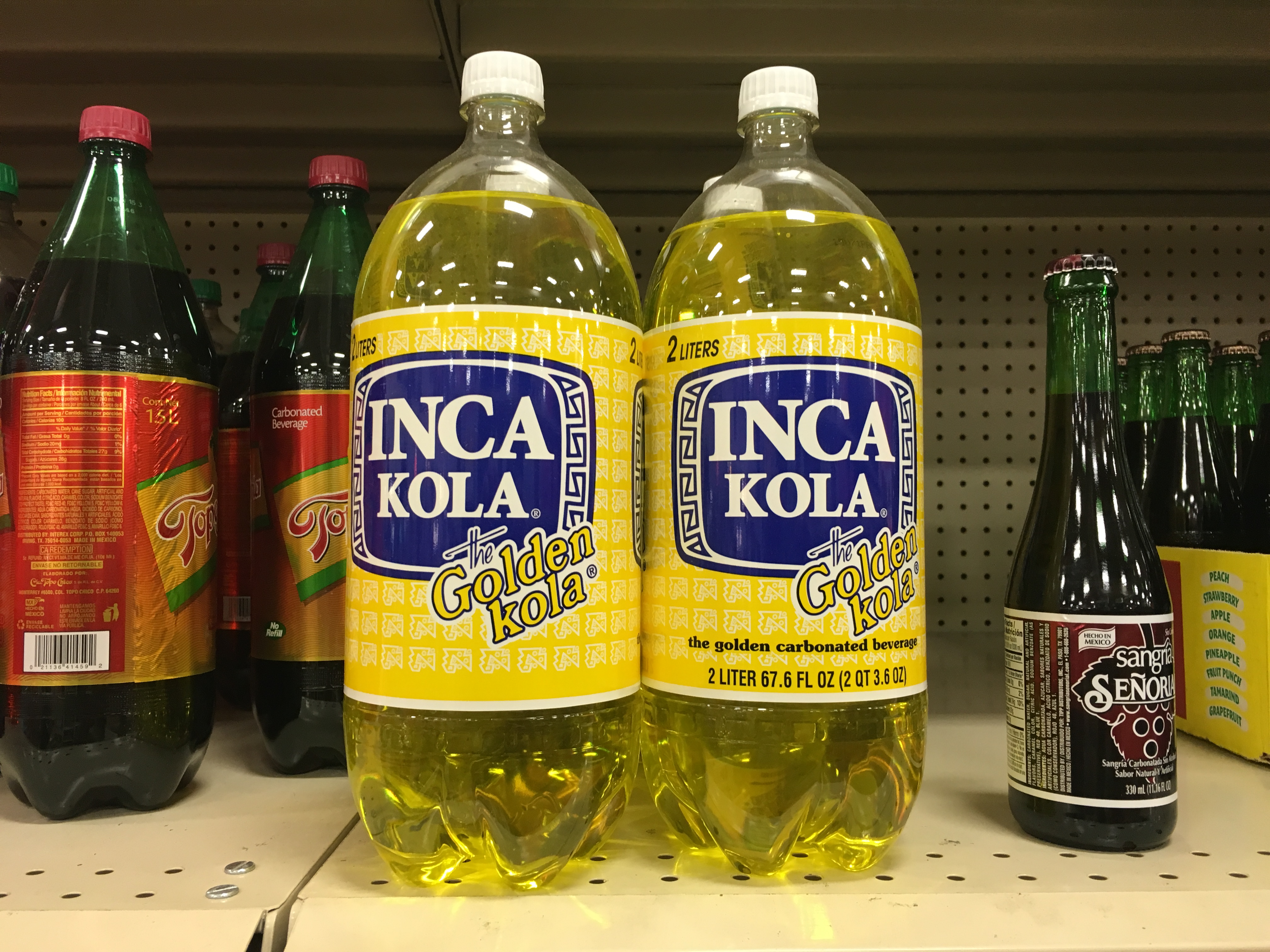
Inca Kola for sale in central Texas in 2015

In 1997, Lindley underwent corporate restructuring. This expansion led to a loss of nearly $5 million in 1999. The company turned to Coca-Cola Co. for assistance, Coca-Cola Co acquired half of Inca Kola Perú and one-fifth of Corporación José R. Lindley S.A. for an undisclosed amount. The grandson of the founder and chairman of Corporación José R. Lindley S.A. Johnny Lindley Taboada became the chairman of the joint venture between Coca-Cola and Inca Kola. Coca-Cola emerged as the sole owner of the Inca Kola trademark outside Peru, and a joint-venture agreement was established for operations within Peru. Ecuador and the United States (mostly New York and the rest of the Northeast) are two of the countries where Inca Kola currently bottled by the Coca-Cola Company.

While negotiations between the two companies were underway, numerous small-scale beverage companies emerged in Peru, selling drinks that competed both with Coca-Cola (Peru Cola, Cola Nacional, Inti Cola, Kola Real, etc.) and Inca Kola (Isaac Kola, Triple Kola, Concordia, Oro etc.). These companies promote their products by claiming Inca Kola has been acquired by a foreign company so it is no longer a Peruvian company.

During 2004, Corporación José R. Lindley S.A. started talks to buy out Embotelladora Latinoamericana S.A.. The company has been bottling Inca Cola since 1973s. Since Inca Cola merged with Coca-Cola, the price of Inca Cola concentrate has increased sixfold. The company terminated its bottling contract with Inca Cola in 2000s. In November 2nd, 2005s, Corporación José R. Lindley S.A. purchased two-thirds of Embotelladora Latinoamericana for $215 million. Corporación José R. Lindley S.A. now bottles Inca Kola as well as all the Coca-Cola products using these bottling facilities, with a combined market share of around 60%.

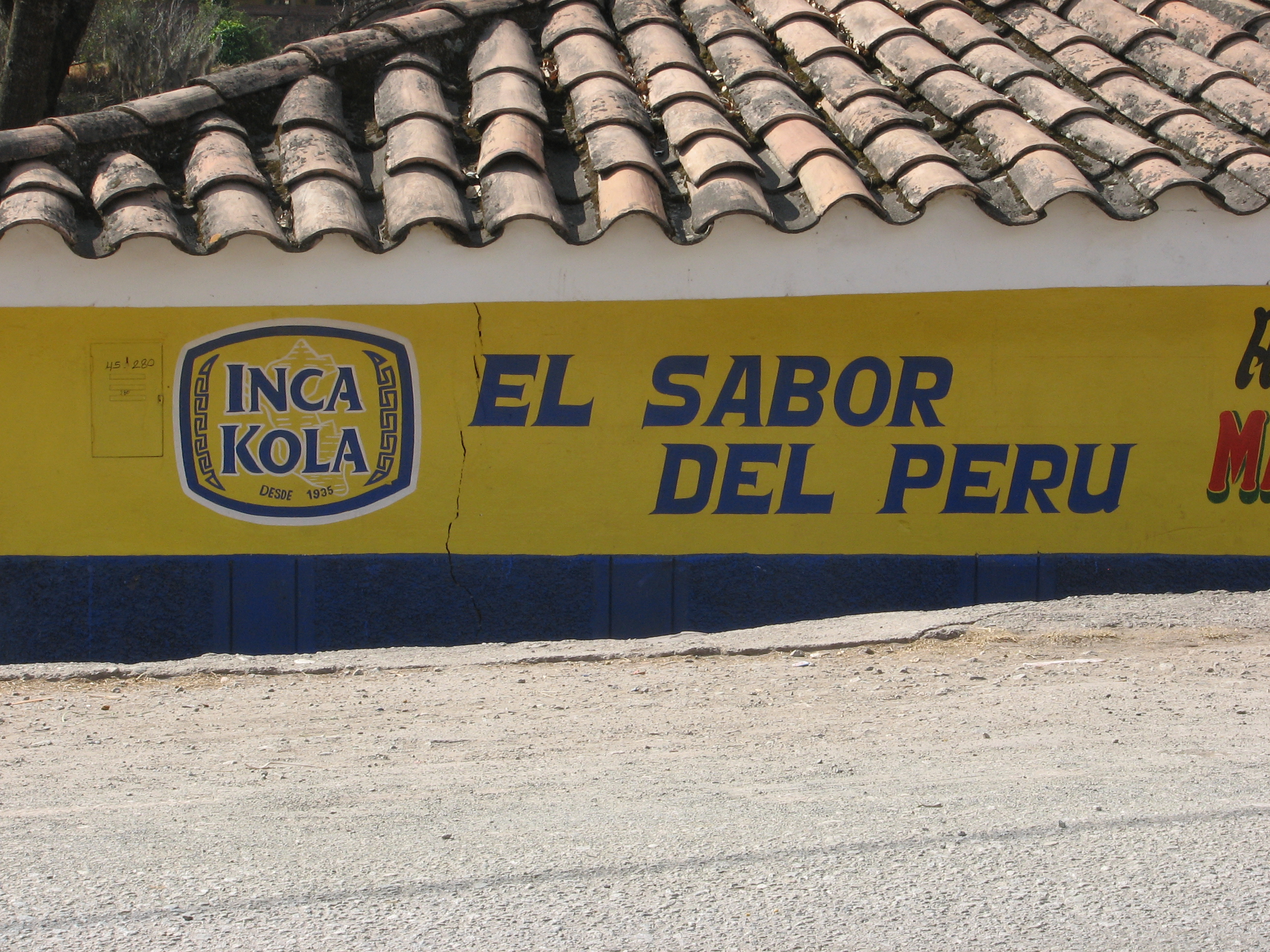
Inca Kola slogan: "The taste of Peru"

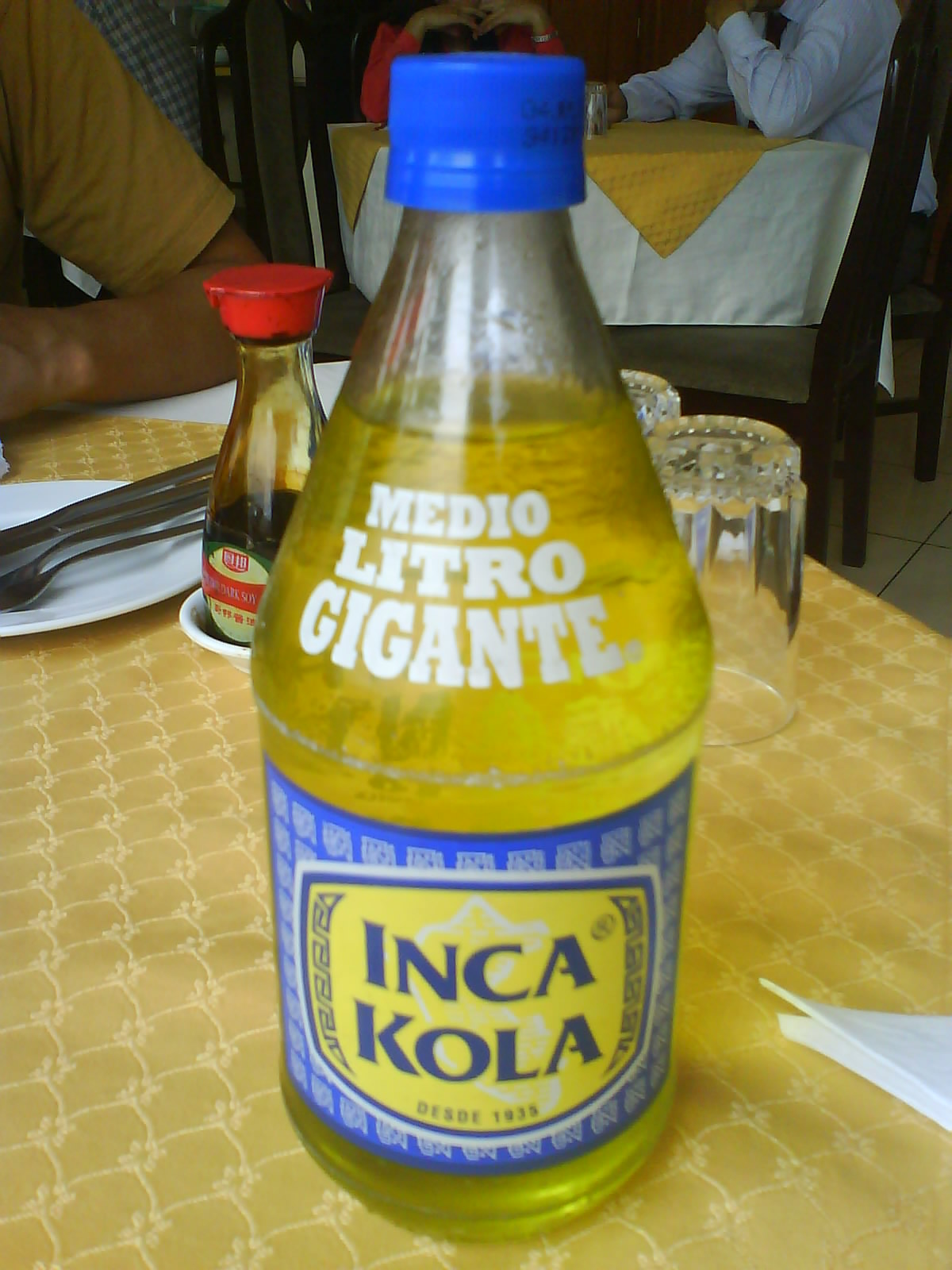
Inca Kola Gordita

== See also ==
- List of soft drinks by country
- Irn-Bru – a similarly flavored Scottish soft drink
- Isaac Kola – direct competitive brand
- Oro – direct competitive brand
- Triple Kola – direct competitive brand
- Viva – direct competitive brand
- Big Red - similarly flavored soft drink sold in the United States
