= Ajegroup =

Peruvian beverage multinational company

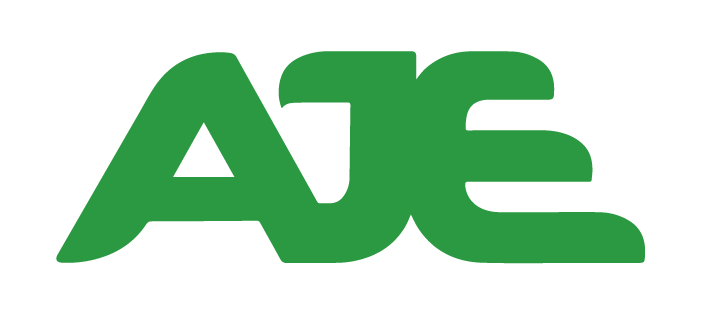
- Type: Private
- Industry: Beverage
- Founded: 1988; 38 years ago
- Founder: Añaños-Jerí Family
- Headquarters: Lima, Peru
- Area served: Worldwide
- Key people: Angel Añaños (Chairman and CEO); Carlos Añaños (President)
- Products: Purified water, fruit juices, carbonated drinks, energy drinks, ready-to-drink teas, grocery foods and alcoholic drinks
- Number of employees: 10,000
- Website: www.ajegroup.com

700 ml Caral

Ajegroup, commonly known as AJE, is a Peruvian multinational company dedicated to the manufacture, distribution and sale of alcoholic and non-alcoholic beverages. The company was founded by the Añaños-Jerí Family in 1988 in Ayacucho, Peru. It is known for its flagship Kola Real.

Ajegroup has approximately 10,000 employees and operates in 22 countries across five continents, placing it 12th among Latin American multinational companies. Besides Peru and Mexico, Ajegroup also has operations in Brazil, Costa Rica, Dominican Republic, Ecuador, El Salvador, Nigeria, Guatemala, Honduras, India, Indonesia, Thailand, Venezuela, Vietnam, and Egypt. Its portfolio includes beverages, juices, nectars, light beverages, bottled natural water, dairy and beer. It manages 17 trademarks in 48 different presentations of PET and glass bottles, and also cans.

== History ==
Ajegroup began in the late 1980s by the Añaños family in Ayacucho, Peru during the Peru's military and terrorist conflict. This situation did not allow many vehicles to access the area where the family lived and many traditional soft drink brands were not available to the customers in the area. The Añaños family saw this as a business opportunity and they developed Kola Real by using typical kitchen equipment and using recycled beer bottles. They first sold their drink products to their neighbors, local people, and soon the demand grew quickly and they began a leading soft drink company. Ajegroup eventually expanded to countries other than Peru. They have businesses in Venezuela, Ecuador, Central America, Brazil, Colombia, Thailand, Nigeria, Indonesia, Vietnam, and India. Ajegroup's main competitors are big companies such as The Coca-Cola Company and PepsiCo.

== Strategy ==
Ajegroup employs certain strategies to help maintain its low cost economic plan. Ajegroup has bottling plants in Huejotzingo, Monterrey, and Guadalajara. The largest of the plants is in Huejotzingo, where production lines run for 24 hours a day, six days a week. Ajegroup therefore produces its own plastic bottles, which provides a low-cost alternative to glass returnable bottles and has helped brands like Big Cola compete with bigger names like Pepsi and Coca-Cola. Ajegroup also utilizes lean staffing to cut costs, and modern equipment and kaizen, or continuous improvement, to help reduce the number of workers on each of the Huejotzingo plant's seven production lines to eight, which is fewer than half that of a typical bottling facility. Ajegroup also gives deliveries to independent truckers rather than employing their own fleet of trucks and drivers, saving money on distribution. This, in addition to their minimal advertising technique, further reduces its costs. Ajegroup has had few television and billboard ads, and primarily relies on word of mouth to find customers.

=== Latin America ===
After 19 years of business AJE finally entered the market in Lima in 1999 by employing a low price strategy, keeping all products approximately 25% cheaper than competitors.

The first expansion outside of Peru was into Venezuela, followed by Mexico, Ecuador, Colombia and then Brazil.

In 2007, Ajegroup entered the alcohol market. It launched its beer business in Peru, later expanding to Mexico and Colombia.

In 2011, Ajegroup took out their first bond, worth 200 million US dollars to finance future growth.

=== Asia ===
Ajegroup entered the Asian market in 2006 beginning with Thailand, which remains the center of Asian operations with Soren Lauridsen as Ajegroup's regional director for Asia and managing director of Aje Thailand since 2016.

Ajegroup officially launched its flagship no-caffeine cola brand, Big Cola as a soft launch in December 2010 in Mumbai, India. They strategically made ties with the release of the Sony Pictures movie, 'The Amazing Spider-Man', in theaters. Big Cola launched limited editions of The Amazing Spider-Man bottles in three flavors until August 2012. According to Sorin Voinea, Director of Marketing (Asia Pacific), Ajegroup doesn't have intentions of necessarily competing with Coca-Cola and Pepsi, but more so, to follow their accomplishments. Big Cola is not only differentiating themselves through alternative methods of endorsement but also with being caffeine-free and having lower prices. While some are skeptical that Big Cola will stand out, Ajegroup's Sorin Voinea believes that their product has enough of its own identity to be successful in the Indian soft drink market. Devendra Chawla, president of the food & fast-moving consumer goods (FMCG), says that the response to the brand has been good at Big Bazaar. “It is available at Big Bazaar in Mumbai and has done pretty well."

Part of Ajegroup's success in countries like Thailand and Indonesia is due to the exclusive licensing agreement between the company and the English Football Association to promote in six countries across Asia (India, Thailand, Vietnam, Indonesia, Laos, Cambodia) for 2 years.

=== Africa ===
In 2015 Ajegroup started expansion into Africa via Nigerian subsidiary AJEast Nigeria Limited led by Theo Williams, Country Manager Ajegroup. Despite strong opposition from entrenched brands like Coca-Cola and Pepsi, the initial capital investment into Nigeria was around N5 billion.

In 2018 Duet Private Equity Limited announced a $50 million investment in AJEast. The investment led by Henry Gabay, CIO at Duet, is earmarked for expansion into additional African countries and increased market share in middle-income households in Nigeria and select West African markets.

== Products ==
- BIG Cola
- SAGEER, India
- Kola Real
- Agua Cielo – Peruvian brand of bottled water owned by the Ajegroup and sold in Peru, Ecuador, Venezuela and Colombia. Cielo is sold in glass bottles of 400 ml and PET bottles of 625 ml, 2-litre, 2.5-litre and 7-litre.
- Free World
- Free World Light
- Pulp
- Oro
- Cifrut
- First
- Sporade
- Citrus Punch
- Free Tea
- Cerveza Franca
- Cerveza Caral – Peruvian brand of beer owned by AJE. It's the company's second brand on the beer market after Franca.
- Club Especial
- INDIA*India
- AJEPER Peru
- AJEVEN Venezuela
- AJETHAI Thailand
- AJEBRAS Brazil
- AJECUADOR Ecuador
- AJECEN Costa Rica
- AJEMEX Mexico
- AJEMAYA Guatemala
- Cool Drink Colombia
- Volt - Peruvian brand of energy drinks. Includes Volt Ginseng, Volt Maca, Volt Focus, Volt Green, Volt Coca, and Volt Agave.

== See also ==
- List of beverage companies of Peru
