= Crush (drink) =

Line of fruit flavored carbonated beverages

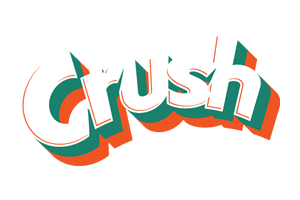
- Type: Soft drink
- Manufacturer: Keurig Dr Pepper
- Distributor: PepsiCo (North America); The Coca-Cola Company (Syria and Lebanon); Compañía de Cervecerías Unidas (Chile)
- Introduced: 1911; 115 years ago
- Related products: Fanta, Nehi, Orange Slice, Sunkist, Mirinda
- Website: www.crushsoda.com

Crush is a brand of carbonated soft drinks originally created as an orange soda, Orange-Crush. The brand is owned and marketed internationally by Keurig Dr Pepper, but is marketed by PepsiCo in North America. It was created in 1911, 29 years before The Coca-Cola Company's Fanta, by beverage and extract chemist Neil C. Ward. Most flavors of Crush are caffeine-free.

== History ==
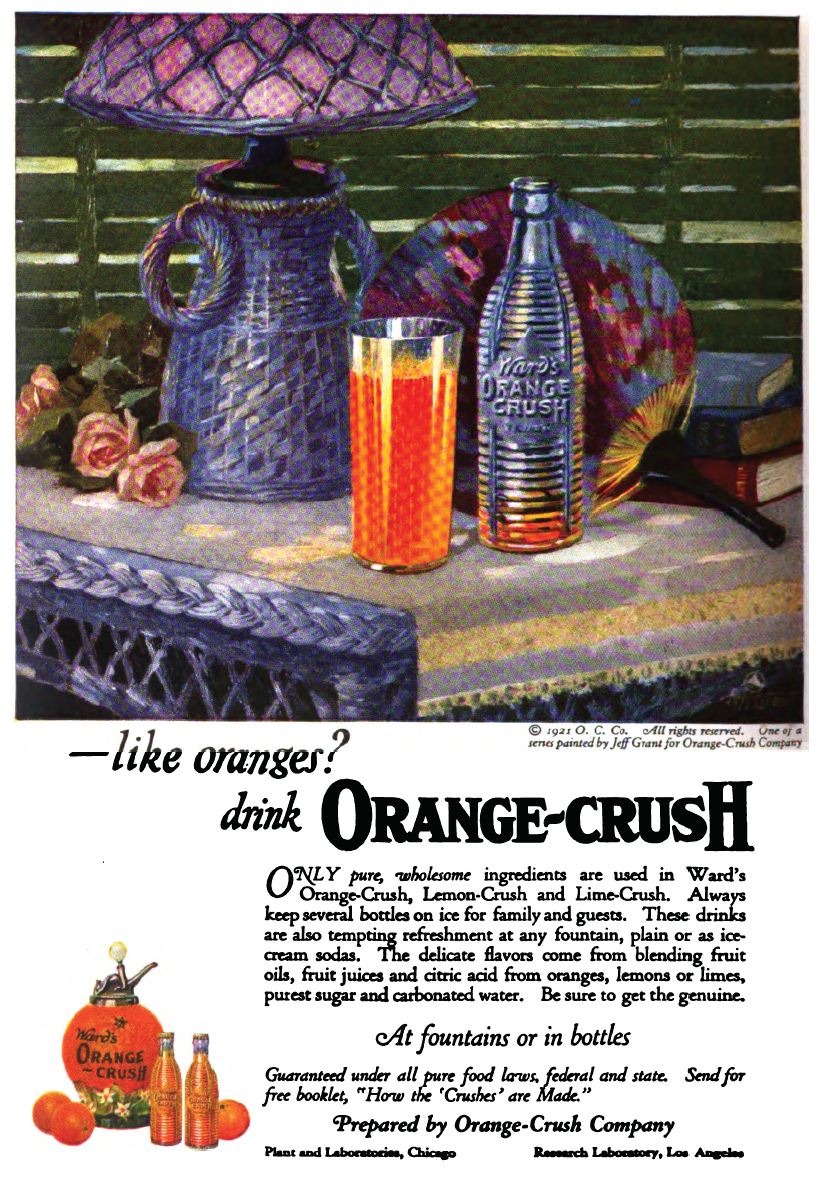
Poster for Ward's Orange-Crush, c. 1921

In 1911, Clayton J. Howel, president and founder of the Orange-Crush Company, partnered with Neil C. Ward and incorporated the company. Ward made the recipe for Orange Crush. Howel was not new to the soft drink business, having earlier introduced Howel's Orange Julep. Soft drinks of the time often carried the surname of the inventor along with the product name. Howel sold the rights to use his name in conjunction with his first brand; therefore, Ward was given the honors: Crush was first premiered as Ward's Orange-Crush. Originally, Orange Crush included orange pulp in the bottles, giving it a "fresh squeezed" illusion, even though the pulp was added rather than remaining from squeezed oranges. Pulp has not been in the bottles for decades.

Crush was purchased by Procter & Gamble in 1980 (with the exception of the Canadian rights, which were purchased in 1984). Procter & Gamble only manufactured "bottler's base", which was a concentrate consisting of flavor and colour. One milliliter of bottler's base was combined with syrup and carbonated water to create a 12-ounce bottle of Crush. In 1989, Cadbury Schweppes acquired Crush USA from Procter & Gamble Co. Cadbury Schweppes spun off its United States beverage business as Dr Pepper Snapple Group (predecessor of Keurig Dr Pepper) in 2008.

Bottles were originally ribbed, and were made of brown glass at one point. Initially, Orange Crush came in the ribbed or "Krinkly", clear glass bottle. The brown (amber) glass bottle was introduced in 1937, and is known as the "Krinkly Brown" bottle. The bottle design changed again in 1955, leaving the amber glass and "krinkles" behind. This bottle was called "the Big New Bottle" and was intended to give the product a larger and more "graceful" look.

=== Today ===
The Crush brand and trademark are currently owned by Keurig Dr Pepper of Frisco, Texas. It is distributed by various Pepsi bottlers, the biggest being the Pepsi Bottling Group United States.

Other countries where Crush is sold are Argentina, Colombia, Chile, Guatemala, Lebanon, Mexico, Panama, Paraguay, Peru, Syria, Uruguay and at one time Nicaragua, Costa Rica, Ecuador and Bolivia. In Chile, Crush has been distributed by Compañía de Cervecerías Unidas since the 1940s. In contrast, in some countries of Latin America the Crush brand is distributed by The Coca-Cola Company, using the same colours and bottles as Fanta.

Several flavors (Orange, Diet Orange, Grape, Strawberry, Peach, Pineapple) are available at most stores throughout North America; others, however, are distributed only within small markets. Pineapple Crush, Birch Beer Crush, and Lime Crush for instance, are found in both cans and single serving bottles in the Canadian province of Newfoundland and Labrador and in Fort McMurray, Alberta. From 2009, changes in bottling rights allowed many of these regional flavors to be distributed by the Pepsi Bottling Group in a majority of their territory in the United States, and for PepsiAmerica to distribute Crush in most of its territory.

== Flavors ==
- Cocoa Crush
- Crush Apple
- Crush Banana
- Crush Berry Blast
- Crush Berry Punch
- Crush Berry Pomegranate
- Crush Birch Beer (Newfoundland and Labrador, also available at some Sobeys grocery chains across Canada)
- Crush Blue Raspberry
- Crush Bubblegum (Slush only)
- Crush Cherry (2009–)
- Crush Chocolate
- Crush Cola (Kuwait, 1970s–1990s)
- Crush Cream Soda (Canada and UK); sold clear in Québec, and Newfoundland and Labrador; sold pink in the rest of Canada
- Crush Frozen Orange Dream
- Crush Tropical Punch
- Crush Fruity Red
- Crush Fruit Punch
- Crush Ginger Beer
- Crush Grapefruit
- Crush Grape
- Crush Lemon
- Crush Lemonade
- Crush Lemon-Lime
- Crush Lime
- Crush Lime Rickey
- Crush Mango
- Crush Nectar
- Crush Orange
- Crush Orange Dry
- Crush Peach
- Crush Peach Sour
- Crush Pear
- Crush Pineapple (Originally sold only in Newfoundland)
- Crush Pink Grapefruit
- Crush Red Cream
- Crush Red Licorice
- Crush Root Beer
- Crush Sarsi
- Crush Soda Water (Kuwait, 1970s–1990s)
- Crush Sour Apple (briefly offered in 2005)
- Crush Sour Patch Kids Berry
- Crush Spruce Beer
- Crush Strawberries 'n' Cream
- Crush Strawberry
- Crush Strawberry Lemonade
- Crush Tuti-Fruti
- Crush Wild Cherry Cola
- Crush Watermelon
- Crush Zero Sugar Orange
- Diet Crush Apple
- Diet Crush Cream Soda
- Diet Crush Grape
- Diet Crush Lime
- Orange Crush Light (in Chile)
- Diet Crush Orange

== See also ==
- Orange Crush Bottling Plant
