= Kola Real =

Peruvian soft drink

Kola real
- Type: Soft-drink
- Manufacturer: Ajegroup
- Origin: Peru
- Introduced: 23 June 1988; 38 years ago
- Variants: cola, orange, strawberry, pineapple, lemon, blueberry
- Related products: Coca-Cola, Inca Kola
- Website: www.group-ism.com/peru/bebida-gasificada/kola-real/

Kola Real ("Royal Cola" or "Real Cola") is one of the most popular brands of Ajegroup, a leader in the Latin American beverage market. Started by the Añaños Family es in Ayacucho, Peru on 23 June 1988, the company has grown and expanded not only in Peru, but also in Cuba, Ecuador, Dominican Republic, Venezuela, Costa Rica, El Salvador, Mexico, Colombia, Brazil, Honduras, Nicaragua, Panama, Thailand and Egypt . Kola Real is available in many flavours such as "revolution red" (strawberry), orange, pineapple, lime-lemon, "negra" ("black", similar to Coca-Cola) and "dorada" ("golden", similar to Inca Kola). In Nigeria, Honduras, Mexico, Costa Rica, Colombia, Panama, Venezuela, Ecuador, Indonesia, Thailand, Laos and Egypt, Kola Real "negra" is known as Big Cola.

== See also ==
- List of soft drinks by country
