= List of people with brain tumors =

A brain tumor is an abnormal growth of cells within the brain or inside the skull, and can be cancerous (malignant) or non-cancerous (benign). Just over half of all primary brain tumors are malignant; the rest are benign, though they may still be life-threatening. In the United States in 2000, survivors of benign primary brain tumors outnumbered those who had cancerous primary brain tumors by approximately 4:1. Metastatic brain cancer is over six times more common than primary brain cancer, as it occurs in about 10–30% of all people with cancer.

This is a list of notable people who have had a primary or metastatic brain tumor (either benign or malignant) at some time in their lives, as confirmed by public information. Tumor type and survival duration are listed where the information is known. Blank spaces in these columns appear where precise information has not been released to the public. Medicine does not designate most long-term survivors as cured.

The National Cancer Institute estimated 22,070 new cases of primary brain cancer and 12,920 deaths due to the illness in the United States in 2009. The age-adjusted incidence rate is 6.4 per 100,000 per year, and the death rate is 4.3 per 100,000 per year. The lifetime risk of developing brain cancer for someone born today is 0.60%. Only around a third of those diagnosed with brain cancer survive for five years after diagnosis. These high overall mortality rates are a result of the prevalence of aggressive types, such as glioblastoma multiforme. Nearly 14% of new brain tumor diagnoses occur in persons under 20 years of age.

== Acting ==
Name	Life	Comments	Diagnosis	Survival	Reference
Tony Anholt	1941–2002	Actor with various television credits, including Space: 1999, The Protectors and Howards' Way	—	—	
Sam Bottoms	1955–2008	Actor who played in the movies Apocalypse Now and The Last Picture Show	Glioblastoma multiforme	—	
Patrick Cargill	1918–1996	British film and television actor who had been in ill health since being treated for a brain tumor and died a year later; his death was initially attributed to a hit-and-run accident	—	—	
Bert Convy	1933–1991	Stage, film and television actor and host	Glioblastoma multiforme	15 months	
Ross Davidson	1949–2006	Actor who played Andy O'Brien in the BBC soap opera EastEnders	Glioblastoma multiforme	20 months	
Sandy Duncan	1946–	Tony Award–nominated Broadway actress, television actress	—	1971–	
Linda Gary	1944–1995	Voice artist for Scooby-Doo and other animated series	—	—	
Brian Glover	1934–1997	Actor, professional wrestler and teacher	—	—	
Cathy Godbold	1974–2018	Australian actress. After having a brain tumor successfully removed in 2007, a second inoperable brain tumor was discovered in 2018.	—	11 years (2007–2018)	
Richard Greene	1918–1985	Actor who appeared in more than 40 movies and in the British television series The Adventures of Robin Hood	—	3 years	
Susan Hayward	1917–1975	Academy Award–winning film actress	—	2 years	
Edward Herrmann	1943–2014	Actor of stage, screen and film	Glioblastoma multiforme	1 year	
Richard Jordan	1937–1993	Actor of stage, screen and film	—	—	
Martin Kemp	1961–	Actor and former pop musician who is in the band Spandau Ballet	—	1995–	
Arthur Kennedy	1914–1990	Stage and film actor; Tony Award winner	—	—	
Lois Kibbee	1922–1993	Actress who played Geraldine Weldon Whitney Saxon on the television soap opera The Edge of Night	—	—	
Eugene Gordon Lee	1933–2005	Child actor who played Porky in the Our Gang (The Little Rascals) comedies	Metastatic tumor	—	
Katherine Locke	1910–1995	Broadway actress in the late 1930s	—	—	
Meredith MacRae	1944–2000	Television actress and host	—	—	
Victor Maddern	1926–1993	Supporting actor in films	—	—	
Joseph Maher	1933–1998	Irish-born stage actor, film and television character actor	—	—	
Irish McCalla	1928–2002	Film and television actress, eponymous role in the 1950s television series Sheena, Queen of the Jungle	—	Less than 18 months	
Mike McFarland	1970–2026	Voice actor and ADR director known for his work on English dubs of anime	Glioblastoma multiforme	13 months	
Heather Menzies	1949–2017	Film and television actress, role in the 1965 film The Sound of Music	—	Less than one month	
Buster Merryfield	1920–1999	British actor who played Uncle Albert in the BBC comedy Only Fools and Horses	—	—	
Bueno de Mesquita	1918–2005	Comedian, actor and stage artist, known for his ability to make funny faces; suffered from lung cancer (probable metastasis)	—	—	
Greg Morris	1933–1996	African American television actor (Mission: Impossible series)	—	—	
Marshall Napier	1951–2022	New Zealand-Australian actor, playwright, and graphic artist	—	—	
Pola Negri	1897–1987	Polish-American silent movie actress who played numerous femme fatale roles; refused treatment, died of pneumonia	—	2 years	
Tommy Noonan	1921–1968	Actor and Producer, best known for supporting role vs Marilyn Monroe in the 1953 film, Gentlemen Prefer Blondes	—	8 months	
Jerry Paris	1925–1986	Actor and director; played Jerry Helper on the television series The Dick Van Dyke Show	—	—	
Pat Paterson	1910–1978	Actress; wife of Charles Boyer	—	—	
Pat Paulsen	1927–1997	Comedian, featured on the Smothers Brothers television show in the 1960s	—	—	
Slim Pickens	1919–1983	Rodeo clown turned film actor (Dr. Strangelove)	—	—	
Kate Reid	1930–1993	Canadian actress of stage, film and television	—	—	
Mark Ruffalo	1967–	American film actor; an operation to remove a benign tumor caused him temporary partial paralysis.	Acoustic neuroma	2001–	
Irene Ryan	c. 1902–1973	Actress who played Granny in the television series The Beverly Hillbillies; she was never told of her tumor and died after suffering a stroke onstage while performing in Pippin in her Broadway debut	—	—	
Zachary Scott	1914–1965	American film actor, specializing in playing villains (Mildred Pierce)	—	—	
Alexis Smith	1921–1993	Canadian-born film, stage, musical theatre and television actress	—	—	
Michelle Stafford	1965–	Actress, played Phyllis Summers Abbott Newman on the soap opera The Young and the Restless	—	1985–	
Kathy Staff	1928–2008	British actress who played Nora Batty in Last of the Summer Wine	—	Less than 12 months	
Werner Stocker	1955–1993	Bavarian Film Award (Bayerischer Filmpreis) for Best Young Actors shared with Dana Vávrová for Herbstmilch; featured role in television's Highlander: The Series	—	—	
Tara Subkoff	1972–	American actress and designer; diagnosed in 2009. Successfully underwent surgery, but was left with permanent nerve damage and deafness in right ear.	Acoustic neuroma	—	
Kinuyo Tanaka	1909–1977	Japanese film actress and director	—	—	
Anya Taranda	1915–1970	Model, showgirl, actress and wife of the songwriter Harold Arlen	—	—	
Tiny Ron Taylor	1947–2019	American film actor and basketball player known for his height.	—	—	
Elizabeth Taylor	1932–2011	Academy Award–winning actress, star of numerous films	Meningioma	1997–2011	
Henry Victor	1892–1945	Character actor (played "Hercules" in the 1932 film Freaks)	—	—	
Bill Williams	1915–1992	Movie actor who played Kit Carson in the 1950s TV series Adventures of Kit Carson	—	—	
Jeff Winkless	1941–2006	Composer, television and voice actor	—	15 months	
Anastasia Zavorotnyuk	1971–2024	best known for her lead role on My Fair Nanny (2004–2009)	Glioblastoma multiforme	2019–2024	

== Business ==
Name	Life	Comments	Diagnosis	Survival	Reference
James Batten	1936–1995	chief executive officer (CEO) of Knight-Ridder publishing.	—	1 year	
Raymond Bonham Carter	1929–2004	Banker who became a director of S. G. Warburg & Co. and the father of actress Helena Bonham Carter. He became quadriplegic and partially blind after an operation to remove a non-cancerous brain tumor.	—	25 years	
Mary Lou Jepsen	1965–	Technologist and businesswoman, with a focus on optics and electronics.	Pituitary tumor	many years	
Reginald Lewis	1942–1993	CEO of TLC Beatrice International Holdings Inc, the first African-American-run company to have over $1 billion in annual sales.	—	—	
Gerry Pencer	1945–1998	Chief executive officer of Cott Beverages. Pencer and his family became significant philanthropists of brain tumor research and medicine.	Glioblastoma multiforme	8 months	
Rene Rivkin	1944–2005	Stockbroker convicted of insider trading	Multiple meningioma	—	
Dawn Steel	1946–1997	First female top executive of a major Hollywood studio	—	20 months	
Preston Robert Tisch	1926–2005	Businessman; former Postmaster General and half-owner of the New York Giants	—	—	

== Film, television, and radio ==
Name	Life	Comments	Diagnosis	Survival	Reference
Alan Berg	1934–1984	Progressive talk radio host in Denver, Colorado who broadcast his program on KOA. He was murdered in 1984; his story formed the basis of the Oliver Stone film Talk Radio.	—	8 years	
Jack Brickhouse	1916–1998	Sports broadcast announcer	—	6 months	
Tom Cheek	1939–2005	Radio broadcaster who announced Major League Baseball games for the Toronto Blue Jays	—	15 months	
Dan Curtis	1928–2006	Emmy Award–winning director and producer of television and film	—	4 months	
Bill Elder	1938–2003	Award-winning anchor and reporter for WWL-TV in New Orleans.	Glioblastoma multiforme	5 years	
Bob Friend	1938–2008	Renowned British journalist and TV anchor with BBC and News Corporation.	—	—	
Annabel Giles	1959–2023	British television and radio presenter and former model	Glioblastoma multiforme	4 months	
Russell Grant	1951–	British astrologer and media personality	—	2022–	
Chuck Howard	1933–1996	Former producer at ABC Sports and winner of 11 Emmy Awards	—	—	
Simone Giertz	1990–	Swedish YouTube personality, TV host and inventor	—	2018–	
Ted Husing	1901–1962	Pioneer radio sportscaster	—	6 years	
Miles Jupp	1979–	Actor and stand-up comedian best known for his roles in Balamory and The Thick of It; later would go on to dedicate an entire stand-up tour about his experience.	Meningioma	2021–	
Sam Lloyd	1963–2020	American actor, singer, and musician, best known for his portrayal of lawyer Ted Buckland on the comedy-drama series Scrubs and the sitcom Cougar Town.	—	6 years	
Anita Martini	1939–1993	Pioneer print, radio and TV sports journalist who was the first woman to do an interview inside a professional sports locker room (1974); first woman to do on-the-field interviews at a Major League Baseball All-Star Game (1973); and first woman to do radio play-by-play of a professional baseball game (1976). She was the sports anchor for the Houston NBC affiliate and hosted radio sports talk shows for many years in the city.	Glioblastoma multiforme	July 1989 – July 1993	
Britt McHenry	1986–	American sports journalist		2020–	
Maria Menounos	1978–	Television host of shows such as Today, Access Hollywood, and Extra	Meningioma	2017–	
Eleanor Mondale	1960–2011	Cable television host on the E! network; daughter of former United States Vice President Walter Mondale	Glioma with astrocytoma cells	June 2005 – September 2011	
David Morrow	1953–2024	Australian sports radio and television broadcaster and commentator	—	4 months	
Andrew Olle	1947–1995	Australian radio and television presenter for the Australian Broadcasting Corporation	Glioblastoma multiforme	5 days after collapsing (which led to diagnosis)	
Judd Rose	1955–2000	Emmy Award–winning television news reporter, co-anchor of CNN Newsstand	Astrocytoma	About 6 years	
Gerardo Rozín	1970–2022	Argentine journalist, producer, and radio and television presenter	—	2021–2022	
Gene Siskel	1946–1999	Film critic for the Chicago Tribune; television partner of fellow critic Roger Ebert	—	Less than 1 year	
Julia Somerville	1947–	Television news anchor and reporter who has worked for BBC News and ITN	—	1993–	
François Truffaut	1932–1984	Film director with over 25 films to his credit, including The 400 Blows	—	—	
Stan Zemanek	1947–2007	Australian radio broadcaster and television personality; presented a night-time show on the radio station 2UE	Glioblastoma multiforme	15 months	
Kasino	1950–1997	Indonesian actor and comedian member of the comedy group Warkop.	—	13 months	

== Military ==
Name	Life	Comments	Diagnosis	Survival	Reference
Jaime Milans del Bosch	1915–1997	Lieutenant General in the Spanish Army who was dismissed in 1981 for his role in the failed coup d'état of February 23, 1981 (23-F)	—	—	
Bob Braham	1920–1974	One of the most highly decorated airmen of the Royal Air Force in World War II	—	—	
Seyni Kountché	1931–1987	Nigerien military officer who led a 1974 coup d'état that deposed the government of Niger's first president, Hamani Diori; ruled the country as military head of state from 1974 to 1987	—	—	
Thomas W. Steed	1904–1973	Military officer in the United States Army Air Corps and United States Air Force. During World War II, he commanded the 456th Bomb Group (Heavy) throughout its combat service.	Meningioma	—	
Leonard Wood	1860–1927	Physician who served as the Chief of Staff of the United States Army and Governor General of the Philippines	Parasagittal meningioma	17 years	

== Miscellaneous ==
Name	Life	Comments	Diagnosis	Survival	Reference
Jon Bannenberg	1929–2002	Yacht designer.	—	—	
Ben Bowen	2002–2005	Huntington, West Virginia child who attracted media attention and fundraising efforts	ATRT	1 year	
Margaret Brown	1867–1932	Socialite, philanthropist, and activist; survivor of the Titanic disaster; portrayed in the 1964 film The Unsinkable Molly Brown and the 1997 film Titanic	—	—	
Johnnie Cochran	1937–2005	Defense attorney, best known for being a member of the "Dream Team", during the infamous O.J. Simpson murder trial. Also defense attorney for the 1993 Michael Jackson child molestation case. Jackson settled the case with the accusing family.	—	1 year	
Dennis E. Fitch	1942–2012	American commercial airline pilot. Known for his actions that helped to save the lives of 184 of the passengers on board United Airlines Flight 232.	—	2 years	
Robert W. Funk	1926–2005	Academic theologian; author and founder of the Jesus Seminar	—	—	
Henry Kock	1952–2005	Horticulturist at the University of Guelph Arboretum	—	18 months	
Robert Albin Loft	1917-- 1972	Commercial airline pilot. Captain of Eastern Air Lines Flight 401, which crashed into the Florida Everglades on 29 December 1972 after the Lockheed L-1011 TriStar's autopilot was accidentally disengaged, killing Loft, four other crew members and 97 passengers. Tumor found upon autopsy.			
Tommy Lucchese	1899–1967	Gangster, head of the Lucchese Family of the New York City Mafia's Five Families, 1951–1967	—	2 years	
Princess Marina, Duchess of Kent	1906–1968	Member of the British royal family	—	—	
Brittany Maynard	1984–2014	Advocate for the legalization of aid in dying	Astrocytoma	11 months	
Marshall McLuhan	1911–1980	Canadian Communications theorist and educator	—	11 years	
Connor Michalek	2005–2014	Professional wrestling fan and posthumous WWE Hall of Fame	Medulloblastoma	5 years	
Enric Miralles	1955–2000	Architect whose works include the Scottish Parliament Building	—	—	
John Joseph O'Connor	1920–2000	Eleventh bishop (eighth archbishop) of the Roman Catholic Archdiocese of New York	—	—	
Alexandra Sestak	2001–2020	Daughter of Joe & Susan Clark Sestak	—	—	
Craig Shergold	1979–2020	Former brain cancer patient who received more than 33 million greeting cards, earning him a place in the Guinness Book of Records. He recovered fully.	—	1989–	
Deke Slayton	1924–1993	One of the seven Mercury Seven astronauts	Malignant brain tumor	1 year	
Doris Tate	1924–1992	Activist in the victims' rights movement; mother of murder victim Sharon Tate	Metastatic tumor	—	
Mary Hayward Weir	1915–1968	Steel heiress and socialite	—	—	
Charles Whitman	1941–1966	Ascended the University of Texas at Austin's 27-story tower in 1966, and shot passersby in the city and on the campus below before being shot dead by Austin Police. Tumor found on autopsy.	Glioblastoma multiforme	—	
Richard Wild	1912–1978	Former Chief Justice of New Zealand (1966–1978)	—	—	
Frank Wills	1948–2000	Security guard who uncovered the break-in that led to the Watergate scandal	—	—	

== Music ==
Name	Life	Comments	Diagnosis	Survival	Reference
Luther Allison	1939–1997	Blues guitarist	Metastatic tumor	Less than 1 year	
William "Cat" Anderson	1916–1981	A jazz trumpeter who played with Duke Ellington's orchestra	—	—	
Arrow (Alphonsus Cassell)	1949–2010	Montserrat soca singer-songwriter	—	—	
Arleen Auger	1939–1993	American soprano	Glioblastoma	14 months	
David M. Bailey	1966–2010	Contemporary Christian songwriter and musician	Glioblastoma	July 1996 – October 2010	
Bill Black	1926–1965	Rock and roll bass player; recorded with Elvis Presley during 1954–1958	—	—	
Davey von Bohlen	1975–	Musician and songwriter	Meningioma	2000–	
Michael Bolton	1953–	Singer and songwriter	Glioblastoma	2024-	
Ray Bumatai	1952–2005	Musician, comedian and voice actor	Glioblastoma	3 years	
Gregg Burge	1957–1998	Tap dancer and choreographer	—	—	
A. J. Croce	1971–	Singer-songwriter; son of singer-songwriter Jim Croce	—	1975–	
Sheryl Crow	1962–	Singer-songwriter and guitarist	Meningioma	2011–	
Celia Cruz	1925–2003	Cuban salsa singer, Afro-Cuban music	—	—	
Gord Downie	1964–2017	Canadian rock singer-songwriter, musician, writer and activist; lead singer and lyricist for the Canadian rock band The Tragically Hip	Glioblastoma	Dec 2015 – Oct 2017	
William Finn	1952–2025	Tony Award–winning Broadway songwriter; wrote the show A New Brain, which was about his experiences.	pulmonary fibrosis	1992–2025	
Hardy Fox	1945–2018	Co-founder and composer of The Residents	Glioblastoma	1 month	
Sergio Franchi	1926–1990	Italian-American tenor	—	—	
Marie Fredriksson	1958–2019	Lead singer of the Swedish pop duo Roxette	—	2002–2019	
Jeanna Friske	1974–2015	Member of the Russian girl group Blestyashchiye, actress, model	Glioblastoma	Feb 2013 — June 2015	
George Gershwin	1898–1937	Jazz and classical music composer; co-writer of stage musicals and film scores	Astrocytoma of unknown variety	1 month	
Lou Gramm	1950–	Rock music vocalist and songwriter, former lead vocalist for Foreigner	Craniopharyngioma	1996–	
Mike Grose	1941–2019	Former bassist of Queen	—	—	
Bill Haley	1925–1981	Leader of one of the first rock and roll bands, The Comets	—	2 years	
George Harrison	1943–2001	Lead guitarist of the Beatles, songwriter, successful solo artist, and influential spiritual figure.	Metastatic tumor	—	
Simon Jeffes	1949–1997	Guitarist, composer and arranger; member of the Penguin Cafe Orchestra	—	Less than 2 years	
Peter Jones	1963–2012	English-Australian musician; drummer for the Australian-New Zealand pop rock band Crowded House	—	14 months	
Barney Kessel	1923–2004	Jazz guitarist who played with Charlie Parker, Billie Holiday, Benny Goodman, Elvis Presley, and The Beach Boys	—	—	
Lemmy Kilmister	1945–2015	Lead vocalist, bassist, and founding member of Motörhead	Metastatic prostate cancer	Two days	
Otto Klemperer	1885–1973	Conductor; father of actor Werner Klemperer	—	40 years	
John Loder	1946–2005	Sound engineer, record producer and founder of Southern Studios.	—	Less than 2 years	
John Mack	1926–2006	Principal oboist with the Cleveland Orchestra	—	—	
Brian MacLeod	1952–1992	Musician, songwriter and music producer; member of the bands Chilliwack and The Headpins	—	Less than 3 years	
Bob Marley	1945–1981	Reggae musician	Metastatic melanoma	—	
Duncan McGuire	1943–1989	Australian musician, songwriter, recording engineer, producer, and founding member of the Australian rock band Ayers Rock. Diagnosed with lung cancer, the cancer spread to his brain.	—	—	
Aaron McMillan	1977–2007	Australian classical pianist	Hemangiopericytoma	6 years (2001–2007)	
Johnny Mercer	1909–1976	Songwriter and lyricist	—	—	
Ethel Merman	1908–1984	Broadway singer and actress	Glioblastoma multiforme	10 months	
Robert Moog	1934–2005	Inventor of the modern music synthesizer	Glioblastoma multiforme	4 months	
Ted Mulry	1947–2001	Australian singer, songwriter and musician who formed the band Ted Mulry Gang (TMG).	—	7 months	
Marcos Mundstock	1942–2020	Argentine musician, writer, comedian, and founding member of the comedy-musical group Les Luthiers	—	2019–2020	
James Murphy	1967–	Heavy metal guitarist who played in several groups	Pituitary macro-adenoma	2001–	
Doc Neeson	1947–2014	Australian singer-songwriter and musician known as the front man of the hard rock band The Angels	Glioblastoma multiforme	1 1/2 years	
Wayne Osmond	1951–2025	Singer, second oldest of the performing Osmond brothers	Ependymoma	1994–2025	
Renato Pagliari	1940–2009	Italian-born British singer famous for the 1982 Christmas number-one Save Your Love	—	5 months	
Junior Parker	1932–1971	Blues singer	—	—	
Tom Parker	1988–2022	Musician (vocals/guitar/piano) and member of The Wanted	Glioblastoma	2020–2022	
Frank Patterson	1938–2000	Classically trained Irish tenor	—	—	
Neil Peart	1952–2020	Drummer and primary lyricist for Rush	Glioblastoma	3 1/2 years	
Lucia Popp	1939–1993	Operatic soprano	—	—	
Steve Prestwich	1954–2011	English-Australian drummer, guitarist, singer, and songwriter, known as the drummer of the rock band Cold Chisel	—	Less than 2 weeks	
Louis Prima	1910–1978	Entertainer, singer, actor, and trumpeter known as the "King of the Swingers". He never recovered from an operation to remove a benign brain-stem tumor, which left him in a coma for nearly three years.	—	—	
Rainer Ptacek	1951–1997	Guitarist, singer and songwriter	—	—	
Lou Rawls	1933–2006	Soul, jazz, and blues singer; philanthropist	Metastatic tumor	7 months	
Buddy Rich	1917–1987	Jazz drummer and bandleader	—	—	
Johnny Ruffo	1988–2023	Australian singer, songwriter, dancer, actor and television presenter	—	2017–2023	
Kaija Saariaho	1952–2023	Finnish composer of contemporary classical music, including several operas	Glioblastoma	2 years, 4 months	
Conway Savage	1960–2018	Australian musician, pianist for the band Nick Cave and the Bad Seeds	—	2017–2018	
Chuck Schuldiner	1967–2001	Former guitarist and singer for the band Death; former guitarist for Control Denied; influential figure in the development of death metal	Pontine glioma	2 years	
Sam Sneed	1968–	A record producer and rapper	—	1999–	
Bill Stevenson	1963–	Drummer for Descendents	—	—	
Yukihiro Takahashi	1952–2023	Japanese musician, singer, record producer, fashion designer, and actor	—	3 years	
Sara Tavares	1978–2023	Portuguese singer-songwriter	—	14 years	
Tammi Terrell	1945–1970	Soul/R&B/Motown Singer, duettist with Marvin Gaye on "Ain't No Mountain High Enough" and other hit singles. Also toured with James Brown.	Acorn-sized astrocytoma in thalamus	2 years, 5 months.	
Michael Tilson Thomas	1944–2026	Conductor, pianist and composer	Glioblastoma multiforme	2022–2026	
Tionne Watkins	1970–	R&B singer from the R&B/Hip Hop group TLC	Strawberry-sized acoustic neuroma on her vestibular nerve	2006–	
Russell Watson	1966–	English tenor who has released popular albums of operatic-style songs	Pituitary adenoma	2006–	
Sandy West	1959–2006	Musician, singer-songwriter and drummer	Metastatic lung cancer	—	
Carl Wilson	1946–1998	Musician, singer-songwriter and guitarist; member of The Beach Boys	Metastatic lung cancer	1997—1998	
Kai Winding	1922–1983	Trombonist and jazz composer	—	—	
Webster Young	1932–2003	Jazz trumpeter and cornetist.	—	—	

== Politics and government ==
Name	Life	Comments	Diagnosis	Survival	Reference
Lee Atwater	1951–1991	Chairman of the United States Republican National Committee	Anaplastic astrocytoma	1 year	
Beau Biden	1969–2015	Attorney General of Delaware. Biden was also the first son of the 46th US President (2021-2025) Joe Biden and his first wife, Neilia.	Glioblastoma multiforme	21 months	
William J. Casey	1913–1987	Director of the Central Intelligence Agency	—	5 months	
William Consovoy	1974–2023	Attorney who argued before the Supreme Court of the United States	—	2 years	
Jimmy Carter	1924–2024	39th President of the United States, and Governor of Georgia	Melanoma	—	
Chakufwa Chihana	1939–2006	Trade unionist and politician	—	1 month	
Alan Clark	1928–1999	British Conservative politician, historian and diarist	—	—	
Sandy Dawson	1972–2022	Australian barrister	—	—	
Paul Dewar	1964–2019	Canadian Member of Parliament	Glioblastoma	1 year	
Clair Engle	1911–1964	United States Representative and United States Senator from California. Late in his illness, he broke a filibuster and helped pass the Civil Rights Act of 1964. Using a wheelchair, and no longer able to speak, he raised his hand to his eye to signal his vote ("aye").	—	1 year	
Gérald Godin	1938–1994	Parti Québécois politician and cabinet minister	—	—	
Vanessa Goodwin	1969–2018	Australian politician, criminologist, and lawyer	Glioblastoma multiforme	11 months (March 25, 2017 – March 3, 2018)	
Wayne Goss	1951–2014	Former Premier of Queensland, Australia	—	17 years (1997–2014)	
Paul B. Henry	1942–1993	Evangelical Christian, professor of political science, and United States Representative from Michigan	—	—	
David Hermelin	1936–2000	United States Ambassador to Norway	—	1 year	
Tessa Jowell	1947–2018	British Labour politician	Glioblastoma multiforme	1 year	
Ted Kennedy	1932–2009	United States Senator from Massachusetts	Glioblastoma multiforme	15 months	
Peter Law	1948–2006	Welsh politician, independent Member of Parliament (MP) and AM.	—	—	
Mia Love	1975–2025	United States Representative from Utah	Glioblastoma	3 years	
Clare Boothe Luce	1903–1987	American politician and diplomat; an editor, playwright, social activist and journalist	—	—	
Jean-Philippe Maitre	1949–2006	Politician and former President of the Swiss National Council	—	—	
Gladys Marín	1941–2005	Political activist and former president of the Communist Party of Chile	Glioblastoma multiforme	—	
John McCain	1936–2018	Vietnam War POW, United States Representative and United States Senator from Arizona and 2008 Republican presidential nominee	Glioblastoma multiforme	13 months	
Robert Evander McNair	1923–2007	Governor of South Carolina	—	50 days	
Lennart Meri	1929–2006	President of Estonia	—	7 months	
Matthew Morris	1969–2020	Australian politician	—	—	
Mo Mowlam	1949–2005	Secretary of State for Northern Ireland	—	7 years	
Robert Novak	1931–2009	Political pundit	—	1 year	
Alan Nunnelee	1958–2015	United States Representative from Mississippi	—	9 months	
Bob O'Connor	1944–2006	Mayor of Pittsburgh	Central nervous system (CNS) lymphoma	—	
Pío Pico	1801–1894	Last Mexican governor of California; suffered from Acromegaly between at least 1847 to 1858, followed by selective pituitary tumor apoplexy with reversal of all tumor manifestations and survival to 1894	Growth hormone–secreting pituitary adenoma with apoplexy	1847–1894	
Cecile Richards	1957–2025	President of Planned Parenthood Federation of America and its affiliated Planned Parenthood Action Fund from 2006 to 2018	Glioblastoma multiforme	2 years	
Kim Santow	1941–2008	Australian Supreme Court Judge from New South Wales.	—	—	
Yahya Sinwar	1962–2024	Palestinian militant, politician, and Hamas leader		20 years, killed by Israel Defense Forces	
Arlen Specter	1930–2012	United States Senator from Pennsylvania	—	1993–2012	
Bob Such	1944–2014	South Australian politician	—	7 months and 1 week	
Mike Synar	1950–1996	United States Representative from Oklahoma	Glioblastoma multiforme	5 months	
Frank Tejeda	1946–1997	United States Representative from Texas	—	1 year	
Joop den Uyl	1919–1987	Former Prime Minister of the Netherlands from 1973 until 1977, as a member of the social democratic Labour Party (PvdA).	—	3 months	

== Science ==
Name	Life	Comments	Diagnosis	Survival	Reference
Max Abraham	1875–1922	Physicist and contemporary of Einstein and Lorentz	—	—	
William Bright	1928–2006	Linguist who specialized in Native American and South Asian languages and descriptive linguistics; father of Susie Bright	—	—	
Édouard Brissaud	1852–1909	A physician and pathologist. His tumor was unsuccessfully operated on by Sir Victor Horsley.	—	—	
Thomas Donaldson	1945–2006	Mathematician and cryonics advocate	—	—	
Rhodes Fairbridge	1914–2006	Geologist and expert on climate change	—	—	
Paul Feyerabend	1924–1994	Philosopher of science	—	Less than 1 year	
Larry W. Fullerton	1950–2016	American inventor	Glioblastoma multiforme	Less than 1 year	
Thor Heyerdahl	1914–2002	Marine biologist who embarked on Kon-Tiki expedition and other journeys that reproduced ancient technology and demonstrated the feasibility of ancient sea migrations.	—	Less than 1 year	
J. Allen Hynek	1910–1986	Astronomer, professor, and ufologist	—	—	
Andreas Kay	1963–2019	Naturalist and wildlife photographer	Glioblastoma	—	
Norman Levinson	1912–1975	Mathematician	—	—	
John L. Lumley	1930–2015	fluid dynamicist	Glioblastoma	11 months	
Mary-Louise McLaws	1953–2023	Australian epidemiologist	—	1 1/2 years	
Chris O'Brien	1952–2009	Australian oncologist, surgeon, participant in Australian reality television programme RPA	Glioblastoma multiforme	2 1/2 years	
Mihai Pătrașcu	1982–2012	Computer scientist	—	—	
John Vlissides	1961–2005	Software scientist specialising in object oriented technology, design patterns and software modelling	—	—	
Aleksandr Zinovyev	1922–2006	Logician, sociologist, writer of Russian literature and satirist	—	—	

== Sports ==
Name	Life	Comments	Diagnosis	Survival	Reference
Jonathan Gavin	1966- 2013	he was a Scottish judoka best known for winning the Gold medal in the (‍–‍81 kg) division at the 2001 World Masters. he was diagnosed with a glioblastoma multiforme—an aggressive type of brain tumor — in July 2010. Despite being given only months to live at the time of his diagnosis, his strength and determination allowed him to fight the illness for two and a half years before passing away in February 2013.	Brain Tumor	two and a half years	
Lyle Alzado	1949–1992	National Football League (NFL) football player (Denver Broncos, Cleveland Browns, Los Angeles Raiders); made public statements attributing his tumor to anabolic steroids, a claim not supported by medical research.	CNS lymphoma	—	
Rodion Amirov	2001–2023	Drafted by the Maple Leafs in 2020; played in the KHL for Salavat Yulaev Ufa. Diagnosed in February 2022, with further symptoms developing later	brain tumor	—	
Lance Armstrong	1971–	Racing cyclist who was diagnosed with testicular cancer that spread to his abdomen, lungs and brain. Won the Tour de France seven consecutive years (1999-2005), but all titles were expunged due to doping violations.	Metastatic tumor	1996–	
Seve Ballesteros	1957–2011	Spanish golfer; winner of five major championships	Oligoastrocytoma	2008–2011	
Kevin Berry	1945–2006	Butterfly swimmer, Olympic gold medalist	—	—	
Angelo Bertelli	1921–1999	American football quarterback; winner of the Heisman Trophy with the Notre Dame Fighting Irish in 1943.	—	—	
Bobby Bonds	1946–2003	Right fielder in Major League Baseball from 1968 to 1981, primarily with the San Francisco Giants; father of Barry Bonds	—	—	
Ken Brett	1948–2003	Major League Baseball (MLB) pitcher; brother of Hall of Famer George Brett	—	6 years	
Keith Bromage	1937–2024	Australian rules footballer	—	—	
José María Buljubasich	1971–	Argentine association football goalkeeper	—	2006–	
Richard Burns	1971–2005	Rally driver, 2001 WRC Champion	Astrocytoma	2 years	
Matt Cappotelli	1979–2018	Professional wrestler	Astrocytoma later Glioblastoma	2006–2018	
Richard Chelimo	1972–2001	Track champion from Kenya; former 10,000-meter world record holder	—	—	
Maurice Colclough	1953–2006	Rugby player, part of England's Grand Slam–winning team in the 1980 Five Nations Championship	—	—	
Darren Daulton	1962–2017	Phillies catcher and leader	Glioblastoma	4 years	
Chris Doleman	1961–2020	NFL Hall of Fame defensive end; played for Minnesota Vikings, Atlanta Falcons, San Francisco 49ers	Glioblastoma	2 years	
Dan Duva	1951–1996	Boxing promoter behind more than 100 world championship bouts	Primary brain tumor		
Vugar Gashimov	1986–2014	Chess grandmaster; 2009 European Team Chess Championship winner	—	14 years	
Josh Gibson	1911–1947	Negro league baseball player; home run hitter with the highest career batting average in league history	—	4 years	
Tim Gullikson	1951–1996	Champion doubles tennis player alongside his twin brother Tom; coach of Pete Sampras	—	—	
Scott Hamilton	1958–	Figure skater and Olympic gold medalist	Pituitary gland	2004–	
John Hartson	1975–	Professional footballer	Metastatic tumor	2009–	
Craig "Ironhead" Heyward	1966–2006	American football running back (Pitt Panthers, New Orleans Saints, Atlanta Falcons)	Chordoma	8 years	
Heiko Herrlich	1971–	German association football player; Union of European Football Associations (UEFA) Champions League and Intercontinental Cup winner	Germinoma	2000–	
Roger Hickman	1954–2016	Australian yachtman. He was diagnosed with multiple brain tumors after collapsing after competing in the 2015 Sydney to Hobart Yacht Race	—	2 months	
Lauren Hill	1995–2015	Mount St. Joseph University student whose quest to play college basketball received major publicity in the U.S.	Diffuse intrinsic pontine glioma	16 months	
Terry Hoeppner	1947–2007	Indiana University, Miami (Ohio) University head football coach	—	18 months (2005–2007)	
Bob Holland	1946–2017	Australian cricketer	—	6 months	
Dick Howser	1936–1987	MLB shortstop and manager; led Kansas City Royals to 1985 World Series championship.	—	1 year	
Emlyn Hughes	1947–2004	Association football player; European Cup winner of 1977; also known from the BBC television quiz show A Question of Sport	—	15 months	
Colin Ingleby-Mackenzie	1933–2006	English cricketer	—	4 months	
Riccardo Ingram	1966–2015	MLB player and coach	Glioblastoma	2009–2015	
"Badger" Bob Johnson	1931–1991	Ice hockey coach, won the 1991 Stanley Cup with the Pittsburgh Penguins of the National Hockey League (NHL)	—	2 months	
Gus Johnson	1938–1987	American basketball player for the Baltimore Bullets, Phoenix Suns, and Indiana Pacers	—	—	
Walter Johnson	1887–1946	Right-handed pitcher in MLB (original Washington Senators); one of the first five members of the Hall of Fame. His 416 career wins are second all-time to Cy Young's 511.	—	—	
Ruben Kruger	1970–2010	South African rugby union player; member of the Springboks team that won the 1995 Rugby World Cup, portrayed in the film Invictus	—	10 years	
Kyle Kuric	1989–	American basketball player (University of Louisville, Estudiantes, Gran Canaria)	Meningioma	—	
Joe Lewis	1944–2012	American martial artist, kickboxer, point karate fighter, and actor.	—	13 months	
Eric Liddell	1902–1945	Olympic gold medalist in track; portrayed in the film Chariots of Fire	—	—	
Reginald Lisowski	1926–2005	Professional wrestler; known as "The Crusher"	—	—	
Wayne Maki	1944–1973	Vancouver Canucks player in the NHL	—	Less than 5 months	
Peter May	1929–1994	An English cricketer who played for Surrey, Cambridge University and England	—	—	
Frank Edward "Tug" McGraw	1944–2004	Major League Baseball pitcher (New York Mets, Philadelphia Phillies); father of country music star Tim McGraw and father-in-law of country music star Faith Hill	Glioblastoma multiforme	9 months	
Ken McMullen	1941–1986	Australian rugby union footballer	—	—	
Robert Müller	1980–2009	Professional (Deutsche Eishockey Liga) ice hockey goaltender.	Glioblastoma multiforme	3 years	
Bobby Murcer	1946–2008	Major League Baseball player (New York Yankees, San Francisco Giants, Chicago Cubs) and broadcaster	—	19 months	
Dikembe Mutombo	1966–2024	National Basketball Association center (Denver Nuggets, Atlanta Hawks). Member of the Naismith Memorial Basketball Hall of Fame.	—	2 years	
Mark Naley	1961–2020	Australian rules footballer	—	4 years	
Johnny Oates	1946–2004	MLB catcher and manager (Baltimore Orioles, Texas Rangers)	Glioblastoma multiforme	3 years	
Michael Parsons	1960–2009	Australian rules footballer	—	—	
Kim Perrot	1967–1999	Basketball player on the Houston Comets of the Women's National Basketball Association (WNBA)	Metastatic (lung cancer)	—	
John Prentice	1926–2006	Scottish association football player and Scotland national football team manager	—	—	
Dan Quisenberry	1953–1998	MLB pitcher, mostly as a closer; pitched with "submarine" style. 1985 World Series champion with the Kansas City Royals.	Astrocytoma	9 months	
Robert Ramsay	1973–2016	Former Seattle Mariners pitcher	—	15 years	
Bobby Robson	1933–2009	A former association football player and England national football team manager	—	—	
Glenn Roeder	1955–2021	English association football manager and former player	—	2003–2021	
Pete Rozelle	1926–1996	NFL commissioner 1960-89; general manager of the Los Angeles Rams 1957-59	—	—	
Wilma Rudolph	1940–1994	Olympic gold medalist in track	—	5 months	
Robert Stone	1956–2005	a professional rugby league footballer and official who played for the St. George Dragons	—	17 months	
Earl Strom	1927–1994	A basketball referee for 29 years in the National Basketball Association (NBA) and for three years in the American Basketball Association (ABA). Member of the Naismith Memorial Basketball Hall of Fame.	—	—	
Matt Tifft	1996–	American NASCAR driver	—	—	
Fritz Von Erich	1929–1997	Wrestler and wrestling promoter of independent promotion World Class Championship Wrestling (WCCW); patriarch of the Von Erich family	—	—	
John Vukovich	1947–2007	MLB infielder and third base coach	—	18 months	
Dick Wantz	1940–1965	Relief pitcher in Major League Baseball who played for the California Angels	—	1 month	
Michael Weiner	1961–2013	executive director of the Major League Baseball Players Association	—	15 months	

== Visual arts ==
Name	Life	Comments	Diagnosis	Survival	Reference
Kevyn Aucoin	1962–2002	Make-up artist and photographer	Pituitary gland tumor	—	
Fred Conlon	1943–2005	Sculptor	Glioblastoma	8 months	
Arthur "Weegee" Fellig	1899–1968	Photographer and photojournalist; works include stark black-and-white street photography	—	—	
Eva Hesse	1936–1970	Abstract sculptor	—	—	
Philip Iverson	1965–2006	Expressionist painter	—	—	
Lynn Kohlman	1946–2008	Fashion model, photographer, and author	Glioblastoma multiforme	2002–2008	
Bunny Matthews	1951–2021	New Orleans cartoonist	—	2015–2021	
Owen Merton	1887–1931	Post-Impressionist painter, primarily in watercolor landscapes and seascapes	—	—	
Ferdinand Preiss	1882–1943	Art deco sculptor who specialized in ivory and bronze	—	—	
Eero Saarinen	1910–1961	Architect whose work included the Gateway Arch in St. Louis, Missouri	—	11 days	
John Willie	1902–1962	Fetish photographer and bondage artist	—	—	

== Writing ==
Name	Life	Comments	Diagnosis	Survival	Reference
Barbara Albright	1955–2006	Magazine editor; author of cookbooks (with Regis and Kathie Lee) and also books about the craft of knitting.	—	—	
Duygu Asena	1946–2006	Author and activist for women's rights	—	2 years	
Georgia Blain	1964–2016	Australian novelist, journalist, and biographer	—	2015–2016	
Bebe Moore Campbell	1950–2006	Author whose books dealt with race and mental health issues	—	—	
Raymond Carver	1938–1988	Short-story writer and poet	Metastatic tumor	—	
Hugh Cook	1956–2008	Author of fantasy series Chronicles of an Age of Darkness	—	—	
Michael Cormican	1948–2023	Author of A Long Way From Tipperary. During his period with this illness he made medical history in Canada as the first Albertan to be authorized and receive the groundbreaking and potentially life-changing Autologous Dendritic Cell Vaccine treatment for brain tumours through Health Canada's Special Access Program.	Glioblastoma multiforme	22 months	
Carl Foreman	1914–1984	Screenwriter and film producer	—	6 to 9 months	
Robert Forward	1932–2002	Physicist and science fiction writer	—	4 months	
John Galsworthy	1867–1933	Nobel prize–winning novelist and playwright whose works include The Forsyte Saga	—	—	
Veronica Geng	1941–1997	Writer, humorist and former editor of The New Yorker	—	13 months	
Johnny Gunther	1929–1947	Teenage brain tumor patient, son of novelist John Gunther. His illness became the central theme of his father's book Death Be Not Proud.	Right parietal-occipital glioblastoma multiforme	15 months	
Wolfgang Herrndorf	1965–2013	Author, blogger, painter and illustrator. Blog about his life with the tumor: Arbeit und Struktur.	—	—	
Frigyes Karinthy	1887–1938	Author, playwright, poet, journalist and translator	—	—	
Pat Kavanagh	1940–2008	British literary agent	—	5 weeks	
Sophie Kinsella	1969–2025	English author	—	2024–2025	
Stephen Knight	1951–1985	Author who was known for his books criticising the Freemasons. He started having seizures in 1977 and in 1980, agreed to take part in a BBC documentary TV program Horizon on epilepsy. The producers arranged for a brain scan, which showed up a tumor. This was removed but returned in 1984 and despite further surgery he died in 1985.	—	5 years	
Lynda Lee-Potter	1935–2004	Columnist for the British newspaper Daily Mail	—	—	
Diana Marcum	1963–2023	2015 Pulitzer Prize winning former reporter (feature writing) for Los Angeles Times; author of books “The Tenth Island” and “The Fallen Stones”	Glioblastoma multiforme	—	
Terence McKenna	1946–2000	Writer and counterculture figure	Glioblastoma multiforme	Less than 1 year	
William Vaughn Moody	1869–1910	Dramatist and poet	—	—	
Ivan Noble	1967–2005	BBC journalist and science writer who published columns about his experience with the illness; author of Like a Hole in the Head	Glioblastoma multiforme	2 1/2 years	
Chaim Potok	1929–2002	Rabbi and author whose works included the 1967 novel The Chosen	—	2 years	
Matt Price	1961–2007	Australian journalist and newspaper columnist.	Glioblastoma multiforme	6 weeks	
Timothy Reuter	1947–2002	Historian who specialized in the study of medieval Germany	—	—	
David Shaw	1943–2005	Los Angeles Times journalist who won the Pulitzer Prize for Criticism in 1991	—	Less than 3 months	
Charles Sheffield	1935–2002	Mathematician, physicist and science fiction writer	—	3 months	
Mary Shelley	1797–1851	Author of Frankenstein; wife of Percy Bysshe Shelley	—	46 days	
Robert Sobel	1931–1999	Award-winning author of numerous business histories and syndicated newspaper columnist	—	9 months	
Lou Stathis	1952–1997	Writer, editor and critic	—	10 months	
Trumbull Stickney	1874–1904	Swiss-born American poet	—	—	
James Weinstein	1926–2005	Socialist historian and journalist; founder and publisher of In These Times	—	—	
