= Emlyn Hughes House =

Office building in Barrow-in-Furness, England

Coordinates: 54.11722°N 3.22622°W

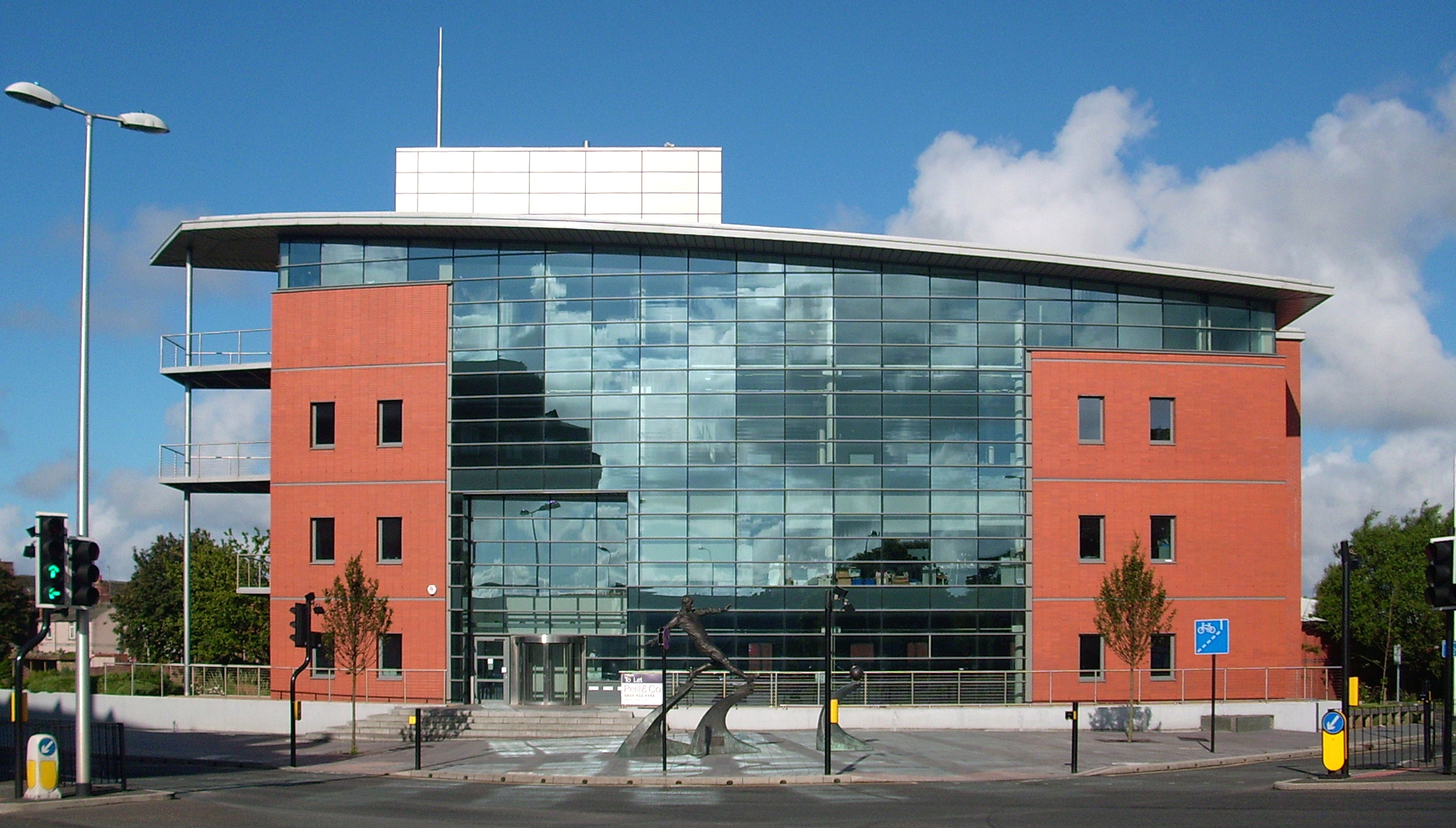
- Emlyn Hughes House in August 2010
- Interactive map of the Emlyn Hughes House area

General information
- Completed: 2008

Technical details
- Floor count: 4

Design and construction
- Architecture firm: Bowker Sadler

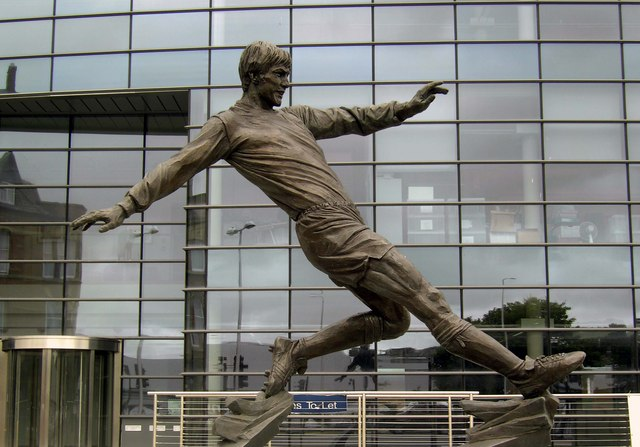
The statue of Hughes outside the building

Emlyn Hughes House is a landmark four-story office building located at the intersection of Abbey Road and Holker Street in Barrow-in-Furness, England. It is named after local footballer Emlyn Hughes who captained both Liverpool F.C. and the England national team, a statue of Hughes is also located outside of the building. Emlyn Hughes House replaces the Art Deco Ritz Cinema and was designed by Bowker Sadler architects and built by Capita Symonds for Barrow Borough Council. There was much speculation that the development would become a 'white elephant' because a year after completion in 2008 the whole building remained vacant.

In April 2012, Glasgow-based Barrhead Travel opened its first office in England at Emlyn Hughes House. Barrhead Travel created offices and a call center for their Cruise Direct business as well as a retail shop at the ground floor level. In 2019 Furness Building Society relocated its headquarters to within the building.
