= Box Clever =

- Genre: Game show
- Created by: Cecil Miller; Patricia Owtram; Robert Richardson
- Presented by: Emlyn Hughes
- Starring: Dr. Sue Kingsman
- Theme music composer: Robert Lockhart
- Country of origin: United Kingdom
- Original language: English
- No. of series: 1
- No. of episodes: 24

Production
- Running time: 25 minutes

Original release
- Network: BBC One
- Release: 31 October 1986 – 8 May 1987

Box Clever is a British game show that aired from 31 October 1986 to 8 May 1987 and was hosted by Emlyn Hughes.

== Format ==
Two families consisting of three members played a strategic board game with the moves dependent on correct answers to a wide variety of questions put by Dr. Sue Kingsman of Trinity College, Oxford. The winners then went on to play a computer game for prizes. The prize consisted of record and book tokens, and the winning family then took on new opponents until they were beaten.

== Winner ==
The programme only aired for a single series, which was won by the Chiappino family from Southampton.
