= The Wizards and the Warriors =

Novel by Hugh Cook

- First edition cover
- Author: Hugh Cook
- Language: English
- Publisher: C. Smythe
- Publication date: 1986
- ISBN: 0-86140-244-8 (first edition)
- Dewey Decimal: 823
- LC Class: PR9639.3.C635 W5

The Wizards and the Warriors is a 1986 novel written by Hugh Cook. It is the first volume in Cook’s Chronicles of an Age of Darkness series, which combines sword-and-sorcery adventure with dark humor and complex worldbuilding.

== Plot summary ==
The Wizards and the Warriors centres on the interactions between wizards and warriors within a chaotic fantasy world.

== Reception ==
Publishers Weekly described the novel positively: "Cook began his fantasy series Chronicles of an Age of Darkness with the witty The Wizards and the Warriors, which viewed magicians as their world's equivalent of none-too-responsible nuclear physicists."

Stephen Dillon reviewed The Wizards and the Warriors for Adventurer magazine, writing: "This is a story about personalities, not powers, about people more than politics. Wizards are real and so are Warriors; they each have their strengths and weaknesses, their likes and dislikes, ambitions and conflicts."

== Reviews ==
- Review by Pauline E. Dungate [as by Pauline Morgan] (1987) in Fantasy Review, January–February 1987
- Review by Ken Lake (1987) in Vector 136
- Review by Andy Sawyer (1987) in Paperback Inferno, #65
