= Mountain Valley Spring Water =

Brand of American spring water

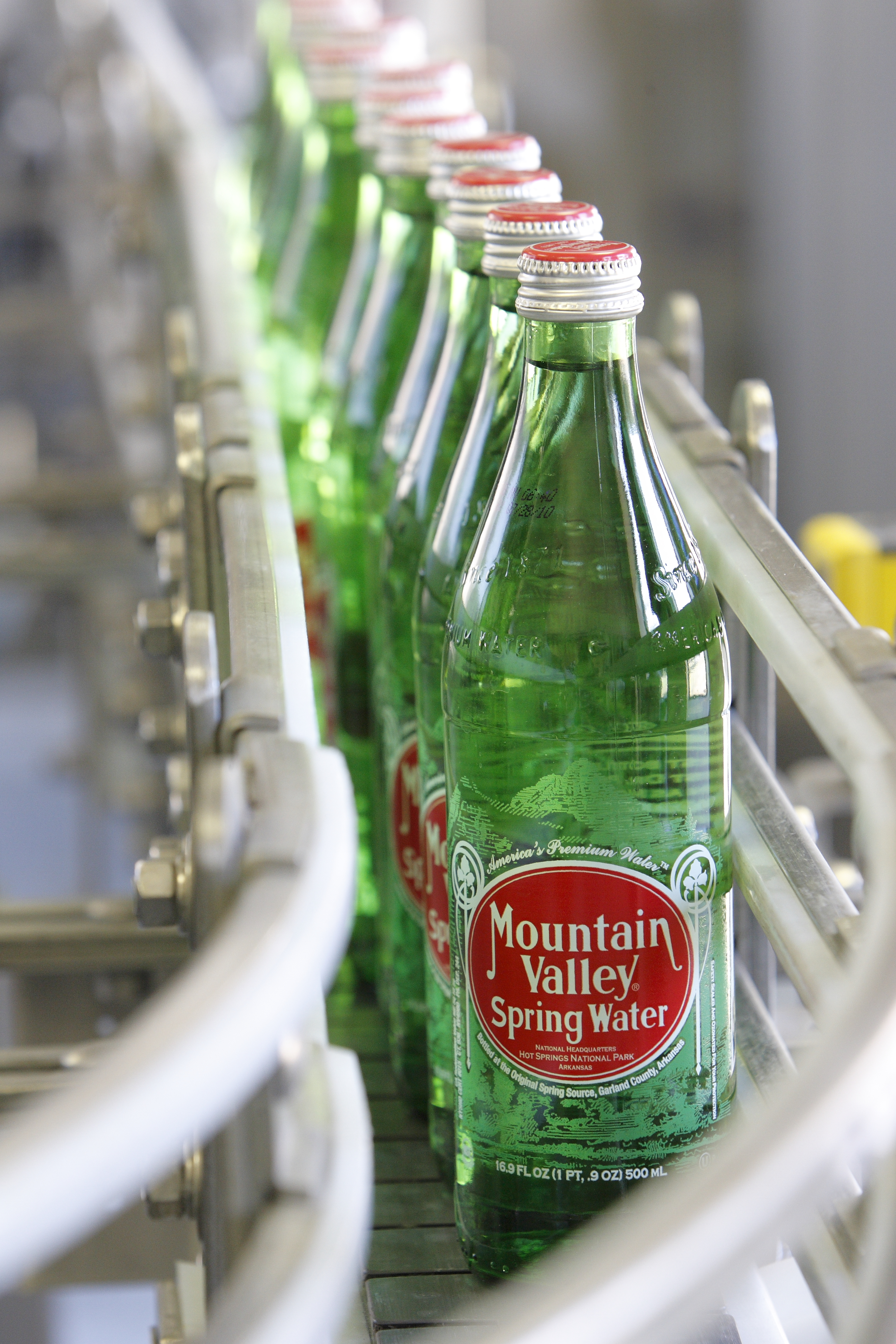
Mountain Valley Spring Water Logo

Mountain Valley Spring Water is an American brand of spring water bottled in Hot Springs, Arkansas. It has been bottled continuously since 1871 and is currently owned by Primo Water. Mountain Valley Spring Water is distributed across the United States.

== History ==
Mountain Valley water originates from a protected spring just west of Highway 7 North, approximately twelve miles from downtown, Hot Springs. In 1871, pharmacist Peter E. Greene and his brother, John Greene, were the first to sell Mountain Valley Spring Water. At that time, it was known in the Hot Springs area as “Lockett’s Spring Water” because of its association with Benjamin Lockett and his son, Enoch. The brothers renamed the water “Mountain Valley” after a small community located nearby. In 1883, the Mountain Valley Water Company was officially formed, with Zeb Ward, G. G. Latta, Samuel Fordyce, and Samuel Stitt House as principal investors and company officers, and Peter Greene remained as the local manager.

Ownership of the spring was transferred in 1902, when August Schlafly of St. Louis, Missouri, already a major stockholder in the company, and his family became sole owners. By 1908, franchise offices had followed in Chicago, Illinois, and New York City. An apocryphal tale holds that two strangers, traveling home to New York from Hot Springs by train, were in the dining car, and each produced a bottle of Mountain Valley for his respective table. This coincidence led to many conversations and then an agreement to form a fifty-fifty partnership for a Mountain Valley Water Company franchise in New York. Upon exchanging business cards, media mogul William Randolph Hearst discovered that his new partner was the well-known gambler Richard Canfield, a man against whom his newspapers were conducting a negative campaign.

By the 1920s, Mountain Valley Water was being served in the United States Senate, and in 1928, distribution began in California, making Mountain Valley the first bottled water to be available coast to coast. In 1924, Schlafly purchased the DeSoto Springs Mineral Water Company, located at 150 Central Avenue in Hot Springs. The two-story, classical revival brick building was built specifically to house a mineral water depot. A third level was added in 1921 to house a Japanese-themed dance hall with accommodations for a live band. The building remained the DeSoto Spring Water Depot and DeSoto Dance Hall until 1936, when Mountain Valley Water Company made the building its national headquarters and visitors center.

In 1966, the Schlafly's sold the company to a group of distributors under the leadership of James G. Scott. The company's headquarters were moved to Paramus, New Jersey, and the historic Mountain Valley building was closed. In April 1987, Sammons Enterprises of Dallas, Texas, purchased the company and returned administrative operations to Hot Springs. Sammons sold the company in April 2004. Then in 2018 DS Services, a subsidiary of Cott Corporation bought the company for $78.5 million.

== Awards ==
Mountain Valley is America's most-awarded spring water, having won 19 honors from the Berkeley Springs International Water Tasting since the organization's inception in 1991.

1992 3rd - Sparkling Mountain Valley Sparkling Spring Water, Hot Springs, AR

1997 1st (tied) - Bottled Non-Carbonated Mountain Valley Spring Water, Hot Springs, AR

1997 2nd - Sparkling Mountain Valley Sparkling Spring Water, Hot Springs, AR

1998 2nd - Sparkling Mountain Valley Sparkling Spring Water, Hot Springs, AR

1999 4th - Sparkling Mountain Valley Sparkling Spring Water, Hot Springs, AR

2000 4th - Bottled Non-Carbonated Mountain Valley Spring Water, Hot Springs, AR

2000 2nd (tied) - Sparkling Mountain Valley Sparkling Spring Water, Hot Springs, AR

2002 5th - Bottled Non-Carbonated Mountain Valley Spring Water, Hot Springs, AR

2003 Bottled Non-Carbonated Water Gold Medal: Mountain Valley Spring Water, Hot Springs, AR

2008 People's Choice Package Design 5th Place: Mountain Valley Vintage Glass, Hot Springs, AR

2011 Carbonated Bottled Water Silver Medal: Mountain Valley Spring Water, Hot Springs, AR

2012 Carbonated Bottled Water 5th Place: Mountain Valley Spring Water, Hot Springs, AR

2018 Best Bottled Water 2018 2nd—Mountain Valley Springs Water, Hot Springs, AR

2019 Best Flavored Essence Sparkling 1st – Mountain Valley Blackberry Pomegranate Sparkling Water. Hot Springs, AR

2019 Best Flavored Essence Sparkling 3rd – Mountain Valley White Peach Sparkling Water, Hot Springs, AR

2019 Best Sparkling – 2019 1st – Mountain Valley Spring Water Sparkling, Hot Springs, AR

2020 Best Sparkling – 2020 3rd – Mountain Valley Spring Water Sparkling, Hot Springs, AR

2020 Best Flavored Essence Sparkling 3rd– Mountain Valley Blackberry Pomegranate Sparkling Water. Hot Springs, AR

2021 Best Sparkling - 2021 5th (tied) Mountain Valley Sparkling Spring Water, Hot Springs, AR

== Notable connoisseurs ==
Mountain Valley Spring and Sparkling Waters are the official bottled waters of the Southern Foodways Alliance and the Society of Hickory Golfers.

Every United States President from Calvin Coolidge to Bill Clinton served Mountain Valley Spring Water in the White House. Following a heart attack in 1955, President Dwight Eisenhower drank the water on the advice of his physician. Other notable connoisseurs of the water included Elvis Presley, and boxing champions Joe Louis, Gene Tunney, and Sugar Ray Robinson. Consumption of the water has not been limited to humans: thoroughbreds such as Secretariat, Nashua, Kelso, Bold Ruler, and Sunday Silence were trained on this spring water.

== In popular culture ==
On television, Mountain Valley has been featured in episodes of Parks and Recreation and Happily Divorced.
