= Cliffstar =

American beverage manufacturer

Cliffstar Corporation is a Dunkirk, New York headquartered maker of juices, sports drinks, teas, and private-label beverages. Cliffstar provides products to grocery, mass merchandisers, and food service companies. Cliffstar operates manufacturing facilities in Dunkirk, New York, Joplin, Missouri, Greer, South Carolina, Fontana, California, and Walla Walla, Washington. In addition to manufacturing locations Cliffstar also maintains processing plants in Fredonia, New York, Warrens, Wisconsin, North East, Pennsylvania and East Freetown, Massachusetts. The company was co-founded by Stanley A. Star in 1970. He served as chairman of the company at the time of its acquisition.

In a deal announced on July 7, 2010, Cliffstar Corporation has agreed to be purchased by Cott Corporation.

== See also ==
- Grape juice
- Cranberry juice
- Sports drink
