= Emlyn Hughes =

English footballer (1947–2004)

Emlyn Hughes OBE
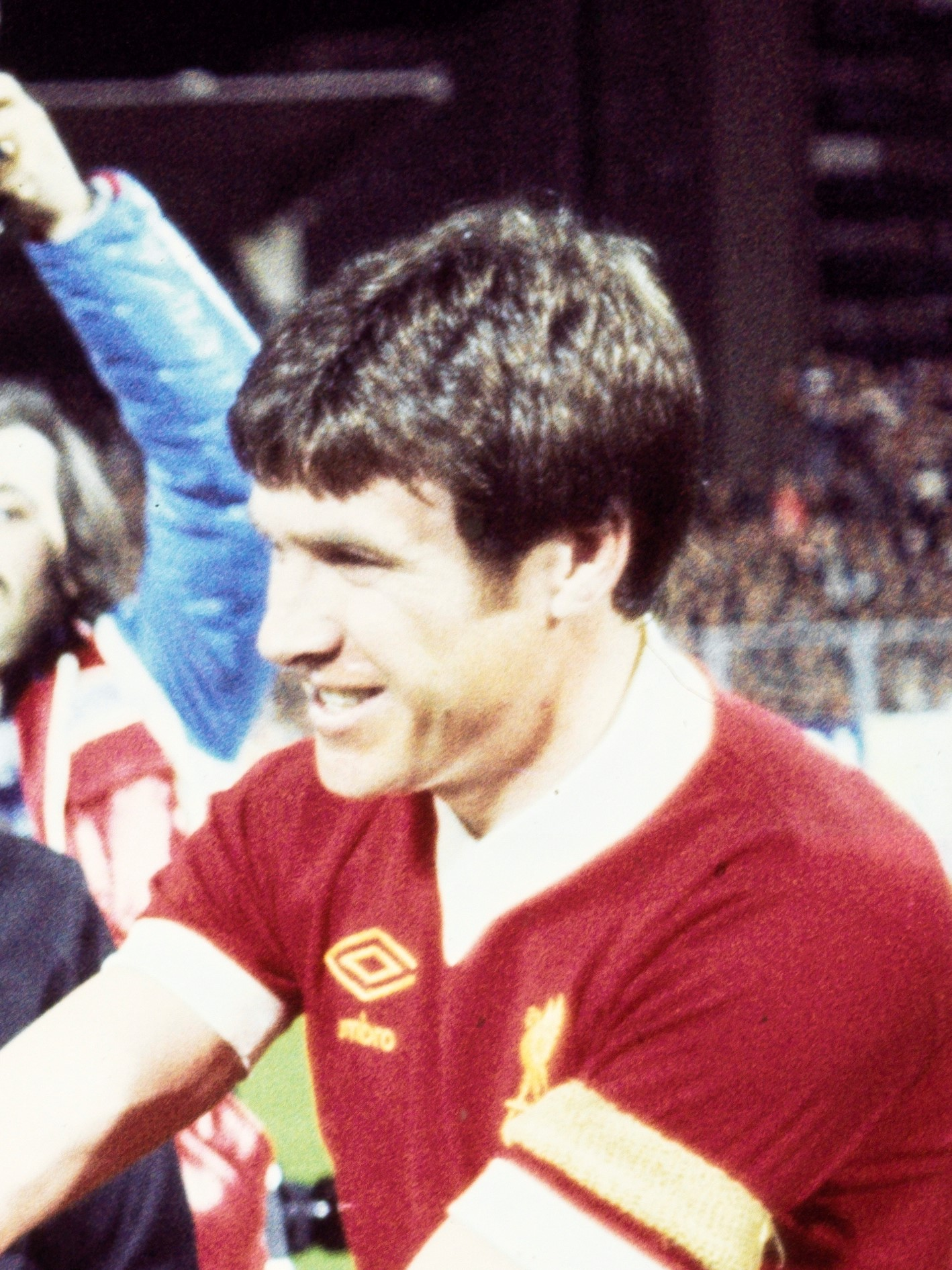
- Hughes, with Liverpool, in 1977

Personal information
- Full name: Emlyn Walter Hughes
- Date of birth: 28 August 1947
- Place of birth: Barrow-in-Furness, England
- Date of death: 9 November 2004 (aged 57)
- Place of death: Sheffield, England
- Height: 5 ft 10 in (1.78 m)
- Positions: Defender; midfielder

Senior career*
Years	Team	Apps	(Gls)
1964–1967	Blackpool	28	(0)
1967–1979	Liverpool	474	(35)
1979–1981	Wolverhampton Wanderers	58	(2)
1981–1983	Rotherham United	56	(6)
1983	Hull City	9	(0)
1983	Mansfield Town	0	(0)
1983–1984	Swansea City	7	(0)
Total		632	(43)

International career
1967–1970	England U-23	8	(1)
1969–1980	England	62	(1)

Managerial career
- 1981–1983: Rotherham United
- * Club domestic league appearances and goals

Emlyn Walter Hughes (28 August 1947 – 9 November 2004) was an English footballer. He started his career at Blackpool in 1964 before moving to Liverpool in 1967. He made 665 appearances for Liverpool and captained the side to three league titles, an FA Cup in 1974, two European Cups (the only captain to have lifted the trophy for the club twice), including Liverpool's first in 1977; and two UEFA Cups. Hughes was named the Football Writers' Player of the Year in 1977.

After twelve years at Liverpool, where he earned the nickname "Crazy Horse" for his energy and enthusiasm for the game, he moved to Wolverhampton Wanderers in 1979 where he completed a full set of English football domestic honours by winning the League Cup in 1980. In addition to Wolves, he later played for Rotherham United, Hull City, Mansfield Town and Swansea City. Hughes earned 62 caps for the England national team, which he also captained 23 times.

After retiring from football, he worked as a media personality, mainly with the BBC. He was made an OBE in 1980 for his services to sport. Hughes died of a brain tumour, aged 57, in 2004. In 2026 Hughes was listed at number 17 in an official club poll of Liverpool's greatest players.

== Early life ==
Emlyn Hughes was born in Barrow-in-Furness. He was the son of Fred Hughes, a Great Britain, Wales, Barrow and Workington Town rugby league footballer.

== Career ==
=== Blackpool: 1964–1967 ===
After being refused a trial by local side Barrow, Hughes joined First Division side Blackpool. He made his debut for Blackpool in 1964 playing alongside Jimmy Armfield and Alan Ball, initially as an inside forward, but later at left-half.

=== Liverpool: 1967–1979 ===
==== 1960s ====
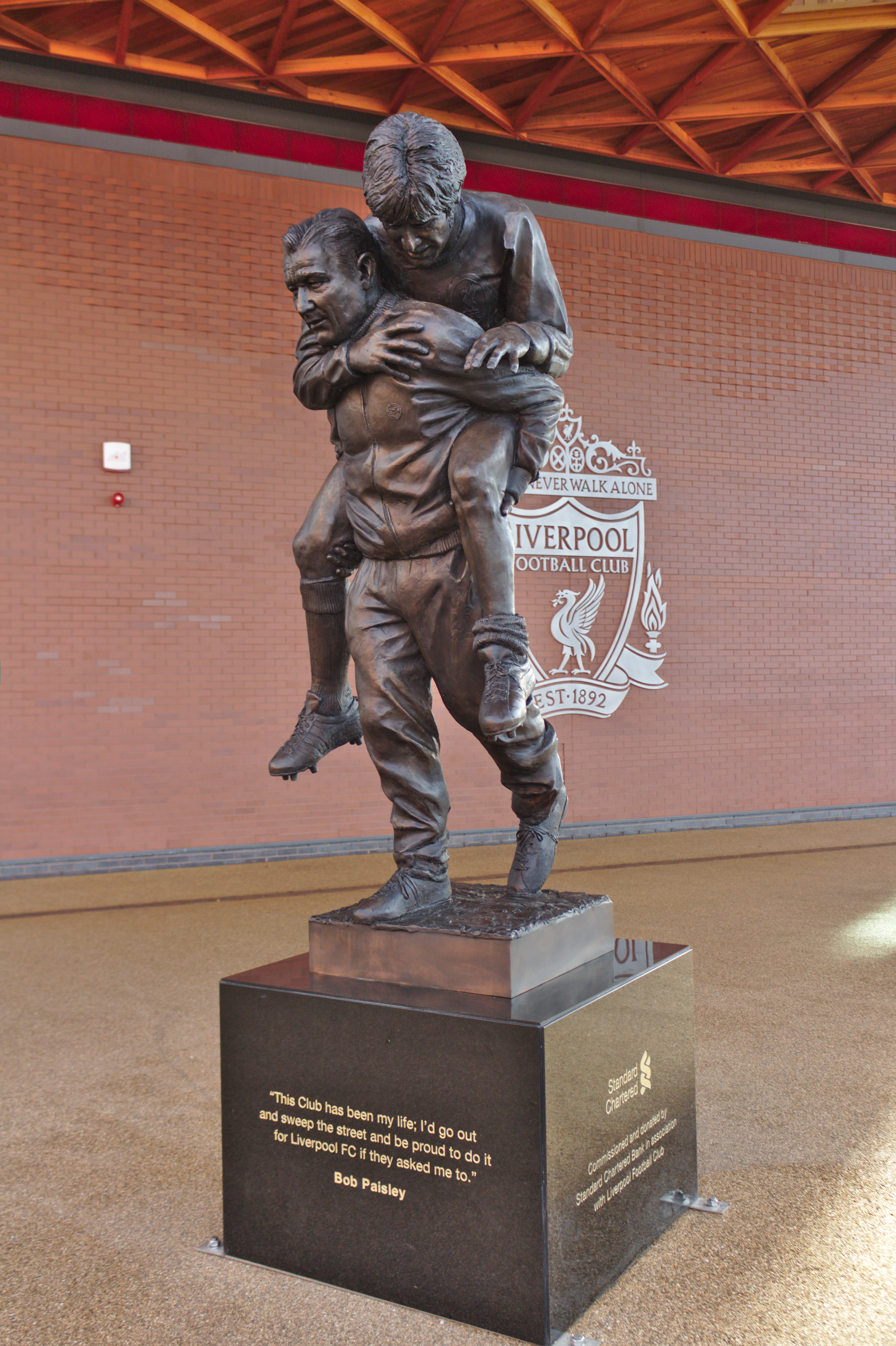
Statue outside Anfield depicting a scene from 1968 of an injured Hughes being carried off the field by Liverpool assistant coach Bob Paisley

In February 1967, after 28 appearances for Blackpool, Hughes joined Liverpool, managed by Bill Shankly, for £65,000 (equivalent to £1,035,719 in 2025). Hughes made his Liverpool debut in a 2–1 league win over Stoke City at Anfield on 4 March 1967. He scored his first goal in a 6–0 defeat of Newcastle United at Anfield on 26 August the same year.

If he'd have cost five times that he would have been worth it. It's debatable if there's a better player in the game. He's got everything; ability, guts, he's quick, good in the air – you name it, he has it.

— Bill Shankly on Hughes.

Hughes settled into the midfield during a transitional period for the club, with the club's site stating he earned the nickname "Crazy Horse" for "his energy, rampaging runs and all-round enthusiasm for the game." With Shankly reluctant to replace a number of his ageing stars, Liverpool did not win any honours in Hughes's first four seasons, but he would become a cornerstone of the team Shankly would rebuild. His versatility was noticed too – he filled in at left back and central defence, a trait which was spotted by England coach Alf Ramsey in 1969.

Ramsey gave Hughes his debut on 5 November of that year, playing him at left back in a friendly against the Netherlands at the Olympic Stadium, Amsterdam. England won 1–0. He played in the next game in the same position. Hughes scored his only international goal against Wales, the opening goal of a 3–0 British Home Championship victory at Ninian Park in 1972.

==== 1970–1975 ====
For Hughes, 1970 was an important year in his career. After Liverpool were beaten by Second Division side Watford in the quarter finals of the FA Cup, Shankly made a decision to clear out many of the senior players who had in the previous eight years won two League titles, an FA Cup, and reached a European Cup Winners Cup final, and recruit younger players to replace them. Hughes, not yet 23, survived the cull, together with Ian Callaghan and Tommy Smith, and the new recruits, such as Steve Heighway, John Toshack and Kevin Keegan, who would help establish Liverpool's dominance in the 1970s began to arrive.

Meanwhile, England were about to fly to Mexico and defend the World Cup won four years earlier. Hughes had six caps by the time Ramsey included him in his provisional squad of 27 which flew to South America for altitude-acclimatising friendly games against Colombia and Ecuador. Hughes featured in neither game but was selected in the final squad of 22. He was the youngest player selected by Ramsey, and the only Liverpool player in the squad.

Along with Nobby Stiles, Hughes was one of only two outfield players who did not feature in any game. England progressed to the quarter finals, where they were defeated by West Germany. Questions were raised about Ramsey's decisions during the game. He controversially withdrew Bobby Charlton and Martin Peters in the second half but retained a clearly exhausted Terry Cooper, who played at left back the entire 120 minutes although Hughes was available to replace him. Hughes would never play in a World Cup.

In the 1970–71 season, Liverpool reached the FA Cup final, losing 2–1 after extra-time to Arsenal, who completed the then-rare double of League title and FA Cup. Hughes had established a reputation for charging upfield from his defensive midfield position on long runs, and for constantly berating referees.

Hughes appeared again for England in the quarter-final of the 1972 European Championships, again under Ramsey, again facing West Germany, again with the same result; victory for West Germany.

In 1973, Hughes won his first League title with Liverpool and his first European honour with the UEFA Cup, against Borussia Mönchengladbach. After scoring goals in a memorable win over Merseyside rivals Everton at Goodison Park, Hughes was made Liverpool captain after Tommy Smith had a publicised falling-out with Shankly. According to the Irish Independent, the "change led to a long-running feud between Smith and Hughes", although it never visibly affected their football.

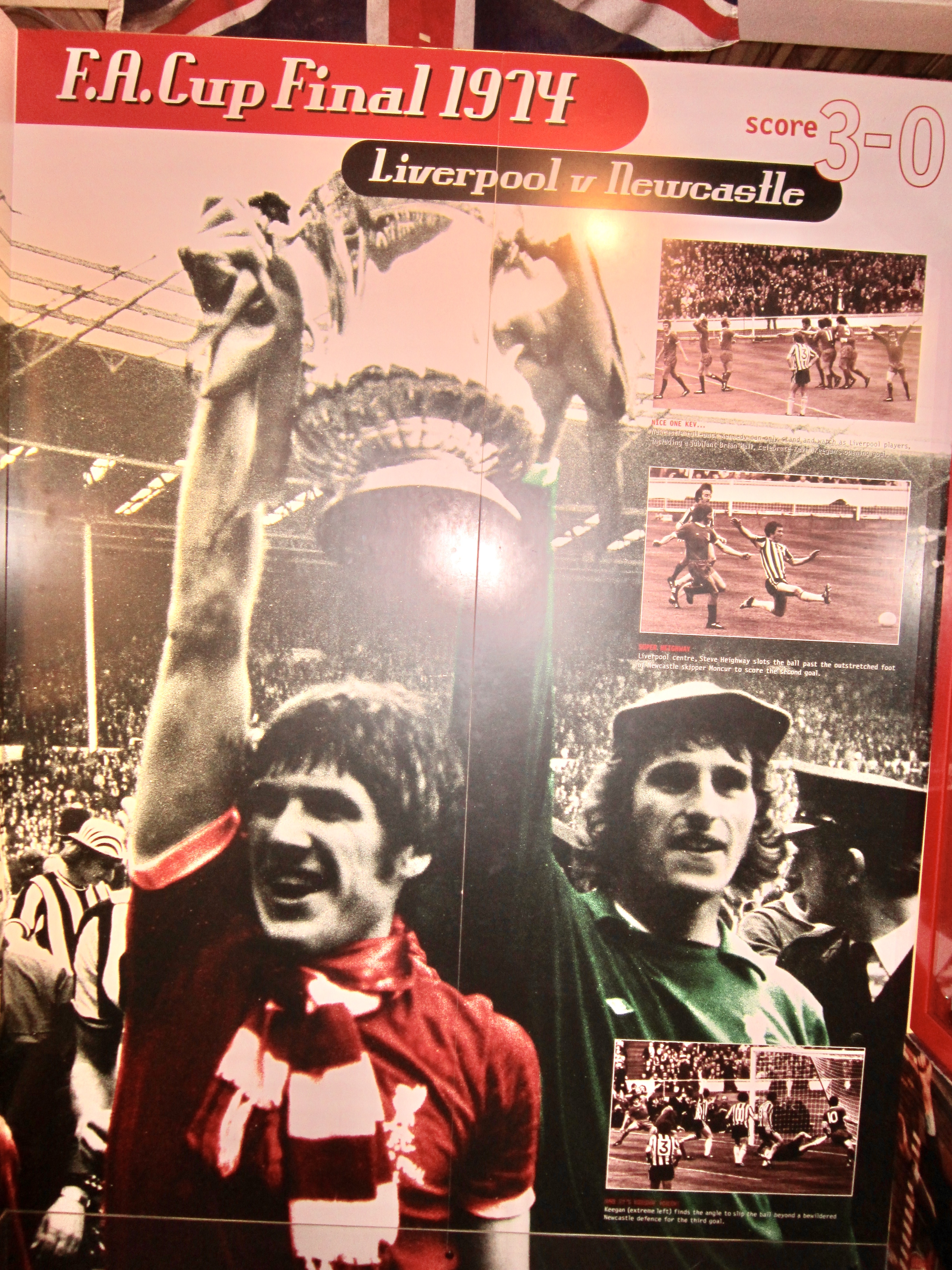
Image of Hughes (with goalkeeper Ray Clemence) in the Liverpool F.C. museum commemorating the club's 1974 FA Cup final victory

In October 1973, Ramsey selected Hughes to be left back as England hosted Poland at Wembley. Only an England victory would secure a place at the 1974 World Cup, with any other result seeing Poland qualify. England dominated the match but were denied constantly by Polish goalkeeper Jan Tomaszewski. Then Poland had a breakaway after a misplaced tackle by Norman Hunter in the second half, and only Hughes and goalkeeper Peter Shilton were back to defend. The ball was passed to Jan Domarski who shot from the edge of the area. Hughes lunged into a last-ditch tackle but Domarski's shot evaded his block and slipped under Shilton's body and into the net. England equalised through an Allan Clarke penalty but the match ended 1–1 and England failed to qualify.

At the end of the 1973–74 season, Liverpool reached the FA Cup final and beat Newcastle United 3–0, with Hughes receiving the trophy from The Princess Anne. Later that month Hughes was also appointed England captain, replacing Bobby Moore, by caretaker boss Joe Mercer. Hughes led out England for the first time on 11 May 1974 against Wales in Cardiff, which England won 2–0.

Hughes captained England for all of Mercer's seven games in charge, and initially maintained the role when Don Revie was appointed as Ramsey's permanent successor. However, after the first two qualifiers for the 1976 European Championships, Revie dropped Hughes from the team, giving the captaincy to Hughes' former Blackpool teammate Alan Ball.

==== 1976–1980 ====
With Liverpool under the guidance of Bob Paisley following Shankly's retirement in 1974, Hughes focused on club football. Liverpool won no honours in Paisley's first season in charge but achieved another League championship and UEFA Cup double in 1976.

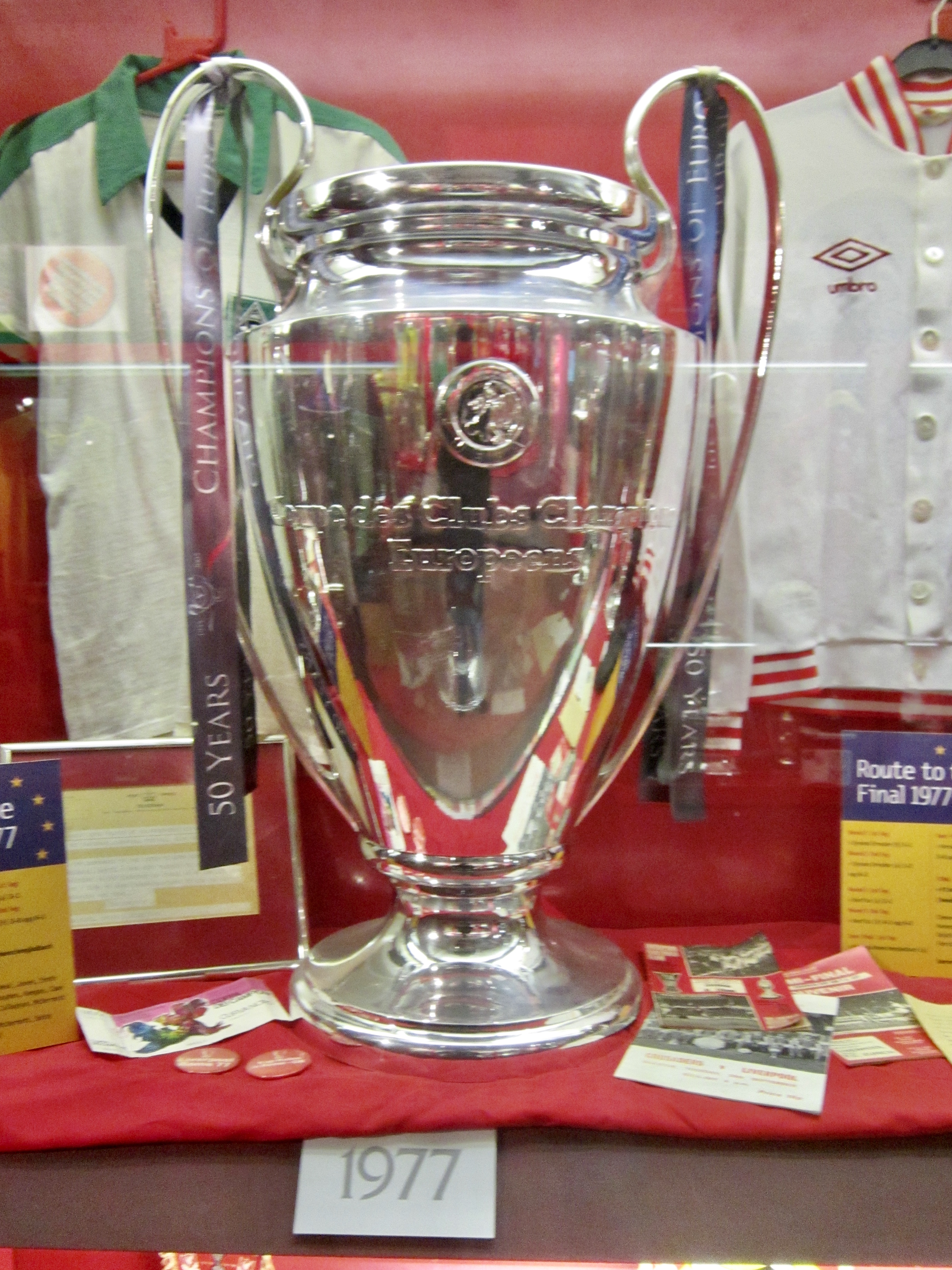
The 1977 European Cup in the Liverpool F.C. museum that Hughes lifted as captain, something he would repeat the following year when Liverpool retained the trophy.

The 1976–77 season began with a shock recall to England by Don Revie, who played Hughes in the second qualifier for the 1978 World Cup, under national captain and clubmate Keegan. Hughes was now predominantly a central defender and played in a tactically disastrous team against Italy in Rome, which marked the lowest point of Revie's tenure as England manager. England lost 2–0.

Revie selected Hughes for further games through the early part of 1977, during which time Liverpool sought an unprecedented treble of League Championship, FA Cup and European Cup. They won the title but lost the FA Cup final to bitter rivals Manchester United. Four days later, Hughes captained Liverpool to a 3–1 win over Borussia Mönchengladbach in Rome to win the 1977 European Cup final, the first time the club had won Europe's most prestigious club title. Hughes recalled as he and Paisley embraced at full-time in Rome they said "Shanks", with Hughes stating that "Shanks had given us, given Bob, a chance to win that trophy." In 1977, Hughes was voted the Football Writers' Association Footballer of the Year.

Hughes regained the England captaincy for a Home International match against Scotland when Keegan was unavailable, before selecting him for the squad which would tour South America in the summer. On returning to England, Ron Greenwood took over as England manager, returning the captaincy to Hughes. England could not qualify for the World Cup after a defeat by Italy, but Hughes nonetheless celebrated a 50th cap when England beat the Italians 2–0 in the final qualifier at Wembley at the end of 1977.

In 1978, Liverpool played and lost its first ever League Cup final, to Brian Clough's Nottingham Forest in a replay. The league title went to Forest too, but Liverpool retained the European Cup with a 1–0 win over FC Bruges at Wembley, allowing Hughes to lift the trophy for a second consecutive year, and he remains the only captain of the club to have lifted it twice. By this time Hughes's place in the side was under threat from talented young Scottish defender Alan Hansen, who had arrived the previous season for £100,000 from Partick Thistle.

The following season Hughes made just 16 appearances in the side, enough to earn his final title medal. Liverpool lost to Manchester United in the FA Cup semi-finals, with Hughes caught out of position for the winning goal. He never played for Liverpool again. He was sold to Wolverhampton Wanderers for £90,000 in August 1979. Hughes left Liverpool after 665 appearances, scoring 49 goals, for the club. His 59 appearances for England while at Liverpool made him the club's most capped player until Welsh striker Ian Rush broke the record more than ten years later.

=== Wolverhampton Wanderers: 1979–1981 ===
Hughes made his Wolves debut at the Baseball Ground on 22 August 1979 in a 1–0 win over Derby County. He went on to win the League Cup in his first season with Wolves – the only trophy he did not win with Liverpool – lifting it as captain after a 1–0 win over Nottingham Forest at Wembley.

He continued to be selected for England squads even after leaving Liverpool. He featured sporadically in England's successful qualifying campaign for the 1980 European Championships, he captained the team for the final time in the 1–1 1980 Home International game with Northern Ireland draw at Wembley and won his 62nd and final cap against Scotland in the next game as a substitute.

Greenwood included him in the squad for the European Championship finals in Italy as an experienced reserve, but Hughes did not play any matches and England were eliminated in the group stages. Hughes was England's only connection with their previous foray into the finals of a tournament – the 1970 World Cup – but his non-participation in either made him England's most capped player never to feature in a major finals. He also became only the fifth player to represent England in three separate decades, joining Jesse Pennington, Stanley Matthews, Bobby Charlton and Peter Shilton. The 57 caps Hughes earned in the 1970s made him the most capped England player of the decade.

=== Rotherham United: 1981–1983 ===
Hughes left Wolves in 1981, joining Rotherham United as player-manager. Inheriting a side that had won the Third Division championship under Ian Porterfield, including such players as John Breckin, Tony Towner and Ronnie Moore, Rotherham made a patchy start to the season and were in the relegation zone in January. However, a run of nine consecutive wins followed and Rotherham climbed from third last to third place in the league. Promotion was missed by four points, but the finish of 7th place was the Millers' highest since the 1960s.

The following season Rotherham appeared to be holding their ground in the Second Division and were 9th at the start of 1983. However, the side plummeted down the table. On the morning of 20 March Hughes was asked to resign as manager. He refused and was sacked, to be replaced by George Kerr the following day. Rotherham were relegated after winning only one more game during the season.

=== Later football career ===
Hughes also played for Hull City, later becoming a director. He joined Mansfield Town briefly in 1983 but did not make any appearances for the club. Later that year he also turned out for Swansea City, with whom he brought his playing career to a close.

== Post-football career ==
In 1979, Hughes became a team captain on the long-running BBC quiz A Question of Sport, opposite the former rugby union footballer Gareth Edwards. He left the programme in 1981, but returned in 1984, this time playing against England's former rugby union captain Bill Beaumont. Hughes became much mimicked for his competitive nature and high-pitched protestations when not being able to recall an answer. He once identified a picture of a heavily muddied jockey as John Reid, only to be told it was Princess Anne. Later in the same series, she appeared on the programme, joining Hughes's team. Hughes famously ignored protocol when he put his arm around her after she answered a question right. He called her "ma'am" throughout, except for one occasion, when he referred to her as "mate". Hughes later joined her team for the much criticised It's a Royal Knockout project, the brainchild of her brother Prince Edward.

Hughes's involvement with the BBC also included work as an analyst on radio. Alongside Peter Jones he was present at the Heysel Stadium disaster in 1985, saying "Football has died and the hooligans have won." He also was a member of the punditry panel for BBC Television's coverage of the 1986 FIFA World Cup. Hughes hosted the short-lived BBC game show Box Clever during 1986 and 1987. However, he left A Question of Sport – and the corporation as a whole – in 1987 to go to ITV and captain a team on Sporting Triangles. Through this, he occasionally appeared as a pundit on ITV's football coverage. He was also immortalised in comic strip form as he was signed by Melchester Rovers in the Roy of the Rovers strip; he also wrote a column for the teenage football magazine Match. Alongside Peter Jones again, he was present at the Hillsborough disaster in April 1989. Later, he paid visits to the parents of Andrew Devine, who was left comatose after the tragedy, in hospital and offered them support and assistance.

== Final years ==
In later years, Hughes lived a quiet retirement, occasionally working as an after-dinner or motivational speaker. In 1992, he appeared on an episode of GamesMaster promoting the football video game which carried his name, Emlyn Hughes International Soccer. From March 2002, he became a presenter and pundit on the nightly football phone-in on Real Radio Yorkshire. From 1995 Hughes became chief patron to the Sheffield-based charity FABLE (For a Better Life with Epilepsy).

In 2003, it was announced that he was suffering from a brain tumour, for which he underwent surgery, radiotherapy and chemotherapy. Hughes was married to Barbara and had a son and daughter, both named after him (Emlyn Jr. and Emma Lynn).

His last public appearance was at the 2004 Grand National, seven months before his death; he was interviewed on Grandstand as an owner of Mantles Prince, one of the runners. He died at his home in Dore, Sheffield, at the age of 57. A minute's silence was held the following evening at Anfield before Liverpool's game against Middlesbrough in the League Cup. His funeral service took place at Sheffield Cathedral.

== Legacy ==
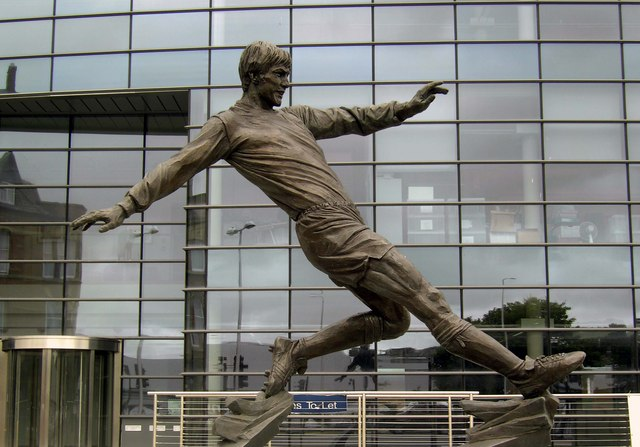
A statue of Hughes outside Emlyn Hughes House, Barrow-in-Furness

Eight days after Hughes' death, England players wore black armbands in a friendly against Spain. England forward Wayne Rooney attracted controversy after throwing his black armband to the ground, following a 42nd minute substitution for Alan Smith. Rooney later apologised.

I had millions of failings, lots of failings, but one thing I did have was a load of enthusiasm. Enthusiasm and enjoyment of what you’re doing, what you’re paid for, is the greatest thing in life.

— Emlyn Hughes.

In 2006, Hughes was voted at No.10 on the official Liverpool F.C. poll "100 Players Who Shook The Kop", and in 2026 he was ranked number 17 in an official club poll of Liverpool's greatest players. A statue of Hughes was unveiled in his birthplace of Barrow-in-Furness in 2008. It is placed in front of a new office building on Abbey Road which was also named Emlyn Hughes House after him. At Anfield, a statue of Hughes being carried off the field by Bob Paisley was unveiled in 2020.

== Awards ==
In the 1980 New Year Honours, Hughes was appointed Officer of the Order of the British Empire (OBE) for services to football, and later featured on the television tribute show This Is Your Life.

On 24 July 2008, it was announced that Hughes would be inducted into the National Football Museum's Hall of Fame. The National Football Museum in Preston started its Hall of Fame in 2002 with the inductees chosen by a selection panel that included Gordon Banks, Trevor Brooking, Alex Ferguson, Bobby Charlton, Jack Charlton, Mark Lawrenson and Gary Lineker. The awards were presented at the annual ceremony, held at the Millennium Mayfair Hotel in London on 18 September.

== Honours ==
Liverpool

- Football League First Division: 1972–73, 1975–76, 1976–77, 1978–79
- FA Cup: 1973–74; runner-up: 1970–71, 1976–77
- FA Charity Shield: 1974, 1976, 1977
- European Cup: 1976–77, 1977–78
- UEFA Cup: 1972–73, 1975–76
- UEFA Super Cup: 1977
- Football League Cup runner-up: 1977–78

Wolverhampton Wanderers

- Football League Cup: 1979–80

Individual

- Rothmans Golden Boots Awards: 1973, 1974
- FWA Footballer of the Year: 1977
- Officer of the Order of the British Empire: 1980

== See also ==
- List of notable brain tumor patients
- Emlyn Hughes International Soccer - 1988 computer game

Sporting positions
Preceded by Tommy Smith	Liverpool captain 1973–1979	Succeeded by Phil Thompson
Preceded by Bobby Moore	England captain 1974–1980	Succeeded by Kevin Keegan
