= Gerry Pencer =

Canadian philanthropist and business executive

- Born: April 26, 1945; Montreal, Canada
- Died: February 3, 1998 (aged 52); Toronto, Ontario
- Occupation: Business executive
- Known for: Founding the Gerry & Nancy Pencer Brain Trust
- Spouse: Nancy Pencer

Gerald Norman Pencer (April 26, 1945 – February 3, 1998) was a Canadian philanthropist and business executive who was the head of the soft drink manufacturing company, Cott (later Primo Water Corporation).

In 1997, he was diagnosed with brain cancer which led him and his wife to create the Gerry & Nancy Pencer Brain Trust, a brain tumour centre where patients could feel at home while receiving state-of-the-art treatment.

== Early life and career ==
Pencer was born in Montreal, Canada into a Jewish family. When Pencer was 44, he took over Cott, at the time an unknown soft drink manufacturer, from his father. Sales increased during Pencer's tenure.

Pencer was also Chairman of Financial Trustco Capital Ltd. which owned Financial Trust Company. Financial Trust Company was acquired by Central Guaranty Trust Company in 1988.

== Personal life and philanthropy ==
On May 23, 1997, Pencer was diagnosed with a grade 4 glioblastoma multiforme. He and his wife Nancy formed The Gerry & Nancy Pencer Brain Trust. Gerry Pencer died in Toronto, Ontario, Canada at the age of 52. He was buried in the Holy Blossom Section of the Pardes Shalom Cemetery in Toronto, Ontario.

== See also ==
- List of notable brain tumor patients
