= Ritz Cinema, Barrow-in-Furness =

Coordinates: 54.1172°N 3.2262°W

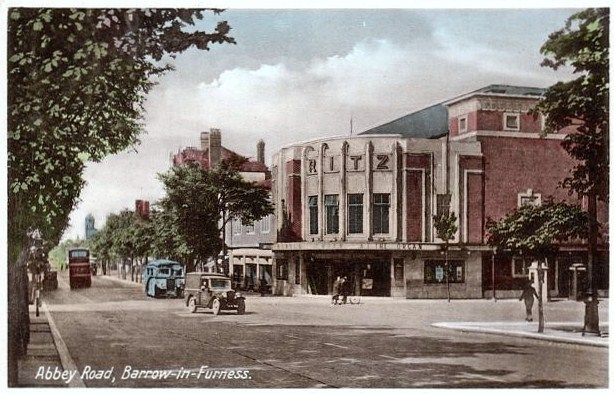
Former Ritz Cinema photographed in its early pre-war years, the adjacent Waverley Hotel being destroyed in the Barrow Blitz

The Ritz (later known as the ABC, Astra and Apollo) was a cinema located at the junction of Abbey Road and Holker Street in Barrow-in-Furness, Cumbria, England. The building was designed in a typical Art Deco-style by architect firm Drury & Gomersall and constructed in 1936 on a previously undeveloped site. The first film to be screened was It's Love Again. The building also contained a row of four retail shops at ground floor fronting Abbey Road in addition to a restaurant at one point.

Between 1961 and 1977 it was known simply as the ABC; after ABC Cinemas who took over ownership of the premises soon after completion. This changed to the Astra when the venue was bought by Hutchinson Leisure. In this period the cinema was completely refitted, adding two extra screens to the existing one. The largest of the screens seated 640 while the smaller two seated 260 each.

In the last part of its functioning life the cinema was named the Apollo after again being purchased; by Apollo Leisure. 1999 saw the completion of Hollywood Park in Barrow and a 6-screen multiplex by Apollo Leisure. As a result, the redundant Apollo Cinema on Abbey Road closed down. Numerous proposals to conserve the building were presented, however a fire gutted the structure in the early 2000s scuppering any hope of redevelopment. Ultimately demolished in 2003, the site is now occupied by Emlyn Hughes House, a four-storey office building now serving as the headquarters of Furness Building Society.

== See also ==
- Roxy Cinema, Barrow-in-Furness
