= Roxy Cinema, Barrow-in-Furness =

Cinema in Barrow-in-Furness, Cumbria, England

Coordinates: 54.1136°N 3.2275°W

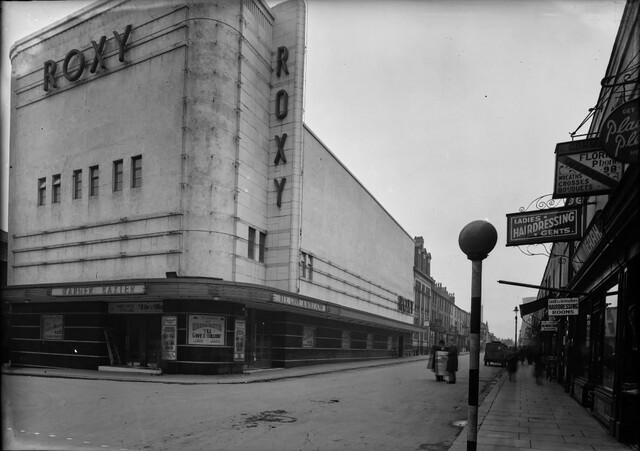
Former Roxy Cinema photographed circa. 19439 now home to Manhattans nightclub

The Roxy Cinema (later known as the Odeon and the Classic) on Cavendish Street in Barrow-in-Furness, Cumbria, England is a former cinema, and one of only two remaining 20th century picturehouses in the town (the other being Salthouse Pavilion). Built in 1937 in the Streamline Moderne-style it replaced a late 19th-century theater also called the Roxy. The cinema was purchased by Odeon in 1943, and again by Classic Cinemas in 1967. Throughout its various forms, the cinema only had one screen, although it could seat up to 1,200 people. Its days as a cinema ended in 1976 when it was soon converted into a nightclub.

The Champers nightclub closed in 1984 and the Roxy Cinema building lay vacant until 1991 when a new nightclub named Manhattans opened. Mahattans ultimately met a similar demise a decade on, although 2011 saw the rejuvenation of the Manhattans brand which reopened a venue within the building. An American themed restaurant/diner and bar 'Hollywood' is also located on the ground floor in the cinema's former foyer. Whilst in the basement 'Broadway' a popular weekend nightclub is located.

== See also ==
- Ritz Cinema, Barrow-in-Furness
