= Chronicles of an Age of Darkness =

Series of fantasy novels

Chronicles of an Age of Darkness is a ten-volume series of cross-genre fantasy and science fiction novels created by New Zealand cult author Hugh Cook. The series broadly tells of the events leading to the end of a fantasy world's dark age.

The Chronicles are not high fantasy, but could be described as Sword and sorcery or Planetary romance. The novels include elements of science fiction, comedy, graphic violence, grotesque and macabre happenings, and political cynicism. They are sometimes described as "gritty" because of their realism.

== Books ==
- The Wizards and the Warriors (published in the USA as Wizard War) – 1986 (ISBN 0-552-12566-0)
- The Wordsmiths and the Warguild (published in the USA as The Questing Hero and The Hero's Return) – 1987 (ISBN 0-552-13130-X)
- The Women and the Warlords (published in the USA as The Oracle) – 1987 (ISBN 0-552-13131-8)
- The Walrus and the Warwolf (published in the USA as Lords of the Sword) – 1988 (ISBN 0-552-13327-2) (ISBN 978-1-60125-214-2)
- The Wicked and the Witless - 1989 (ISBN 0-552-13439-2)
- The Wishstone and the Wonderworkers - 1990 (ISBN 0-552-13536-4)
- The Wazir and the Witch - 1990 (ISBN 0-552-13537-2)
- The Werewolf and the Wormlord - 1991 (ISBN 0-552-13538-0)
- The Worshippers and the Way - 1992 (ISBN 0-552-13848-7)
- The Witchlord and the Weaponmaster - 1992 (ISBN 0-552-13849-5)

In 2026 the series was republished by Zenphos Press.

=== The Wizards and the Warriors ===
The Wizards and the Warriors is the closest of the series to a traditional epic fantasy. This novel set the scene and plot that would dominate the first five books, introducing some of the characters that would feature in the following novels. It is told chiefly from the view of the Rovac warriors Elkor Alish and Morgan Hearst, and the wizards Phyphor, Miphon, and Garash.

=== The Wordsmiths and the Warguild ===
Cook originally intended for The Women and the Warlords to be the second in the series:

The Women and the Warlords was, apparently, a miscue, at least from a commercial perspective. Nobody said so outright, but I was politely asked to write an intermediate book to sit between The Wizards and the Warriors and The Women and the Warlords.

Not really understanding why I was being asked to write this additional book, I nevertheless sat down and wrote it, and had fun doing so ... the result was The Wordsmiths and the Warguild which is the story of Togura Poulaan, a rather hapless young man who endures all manner of adventures but achieves nothing. If he had achieved something, he would have upset my ideas for the overall structure of the series, which was already becoming difficult to control.

As The Wordsmiths and the Warguild was not a long book to start with, I was a bit dismayed to have it cut into two parts for American publication.

=== The Women and the Warlords ===
The Women and the Warlords tells the story of Yen Olass, a female oracle from the Collosnon Empire. Being a female in a male dominated society (the Collosnon Empire and its people, the Yarglat, being loosely based on the Mongols) she suffers some very unpleasant experiences. Cook later described it as "a big commercial mistake [that] probably killed the series".

=== The Walrus and the Warwolf ===
The Walrus and the Warwolf describes the picaresque adventures of Drake Douay, an apprentice swordsmith turned pirate. Drake's story is driven by two narrative strands, both of which are established in the opening chapters. Firstly, Drake meets and falls in love with Zanya Kliedervaust, who rejects him; secondly, the swordsmith for whom Drake works becomes insane and founds a new religion in which Drake is denoted as a figure of evil. The novel relates Drake's exile from homeland (which has fallen into the hands of adherents of his ex-master's religion), and his long quest to win Zanya.

The latter half of the novel is intertwined with the central events of the other novels in the first five volumes of the series: the war of Elkor Alish, the invasion of Argan by the Collosnon Empire, and the fall of the Confederation of Wizards.

The Walrus and the Warwolf was republished in 2010 by Paizo's Planet Stories line.

=== The Wicked and the Witless ===
This is the last book in the series to be set entirely on the continent of Argan and deal with the events around which the early novels revolve. It is the story of Sean Sarazin, aka Watashi, who is the oldest son of the ruler of Argan's most powerful state, the Harvest Plains. Although very ambitious, Watashi is barred by law from seeking power for himself. The novel relates his attempts to make himself a ruler, both in the Harvest Plains and elsewhere.

=== The Wishstone and the Wonderworkers ===
This volume is purportedly a manuscript written by a madman which has been extensively censored and annotated by hostile editors. It represents a break with the narrative of the previous five novels, being set at an earlier time and in a largely unconnected location. Although some of the characters from the Argan novels appear, The Wishstone and the Wonderworkers does not deal with the events of the Argan chronology (the war launched by Elkor Alish and the fall of the Confederation of Wizards). Instead it is concerned with events on the tropical island of Untunchilamon which is subject to the continent of Yestron.

This novel is the first to introduce the Nexus, the interstellar civilization which forms the distant backstory of the Chronicles. It provides an explanation of the history of the planet, and of how it came to be separated from the Nexus and plunged into the "Age of Darkness".

=== The Wazir and the Witch ===
This seventh novel continues the story begun in book six. It is narrated by the same madman, this time writing at a later date at which he has, for the most part, recovered his sanity. It concerns the ruler of Untunchilamon, the Empress Justina. Justina's enemy, Aldarch the Third, has triumphed in the political struggle on Yestron and Justina's rule is at an end. The novel relates her attempts to stay alive and in power long enough to flee the island with her supporters.

=== The Werewolf and the Wormlord ===
The events of The Werewolf and the Wormlord take place shortly after those of the two Untunchilamon novels. The novel is set in the Empress Justina's homeland, Wen Endex, in the north of Yestron and nominally subject to Aldarch the Third. Justina herself is a peripheral character for much of the novel. Wen Endex is ruled by the Yudonic Knights who are reminiscent of the heroic characters of Scandinavian myth.

The novel relates a power struggle to succeed the Wormlord, ruler of Wen Endex, between his daughter Ursula and his grandson Alfric, the protagonist. Alfric is a Yudonic Knight who has largely abandoned his heritage to work for the supranational organization of the Partnership Banks. He is drawn, reluctantly at first, into the contest to succeed his grandfather. Volume eight is notable for its treatment of traditional monsters such as werewolves, vampires, and giants.

=== The Worshippers and the Way ===
Volume nine is set on the continent of Parengarenga. For the most part, it does not deal with the events that take place on either Argan or Yestron. In this novel Cook returns to the backstory of the series first introduced in book six, the interstellar civilization of the Nexus. On Parengarenga, a Nexus combat school has survived the twenty thousand years since the link between the Nexus and the world of the Chronicles was broken.

The AI which administers the combat school continues to train students from the city in which it is located. Thus many inhabitants of the Dark Age city are trained to be members of the advanced technological civilization of the Nexus. However, none of the space-going vessels and superweapons of the Nexus are still in existence and the cadets are trained by means of virtual reality programs. Their technological skill and advanced scientific knowledge are of no use to them in the world they inhabit. The novel deals with one trainee, Asodo Hatch, and the conflict between his loyalty to his family and people in the real world, and his involvement in what he knows to be the futile concerns of the combat school.

=== The Witchlord and the Weaponmaster ===
Book ten tells the story of Guest Gulkan, a recurring character who appears in many of the first nine novels. Guest's story encompasses the entire chronology of the Chronicles, beginning before the earliest previously related events, and ending with the close of the "Age of Darkness". Guest is a typically complex Cook character, a questing hero who begins as a thoughtless, overconfident boy of 14 and, by the time he finally fulfills his ambitions, finishes as a more self-reflective, semi-traumatized conqueror. Guest's quest for power unites many of the most significant plot elements of the series and his eventual success is of a different order from that of the previous protagonists, giving him enough control over his world to change it entirely and bring the series to a conclusion.

=== Other plans ===
The series concluded with The Witchlord and the Weaponmaster due to poor sales. However, Cook had plans to extend it to twenty novels. This would have been followed by two equally long series, Chronicles of an Age of Wrath, and Chronicles of an Age of Heroes.

== Style ==
The Chronicles do not tell the adventures of a main protagonist on a particular quest in sequential order. Instead, each book is written from the viewpoint of a different character, whose personality and objectives differ markedly from the protagonists of other books in the series. The novels are set over the course of about thirty years.

Only occasionally do the plots of the novels interact directly, and when characters cross paths, they perceive events in markedly different fashions. These juxtapositions have been compared to Akira Kurosawa's film Rashomon. The following passages illustrate this; the first shows the view of the prisoner Drake Douay, the second that of his jailer, Watashi.

Watashi's private torture chamber was a soundproof room containing a narrow wooden bench, which bore an ominous number of russet stains, and many ugly implements of iron. Drake did his thinking - and fast. Clearly posing as an innocent peddlar was not going to save him.

— The Walrus and the Warwolf, p. 352

... Douay was gagged and taken to an abandoned store room. Over the last three days, this had been converted into a horror house. Many ugly implements of iron had been gathered together; a torture bench had been installed; and Jarl had slaughtered a chicken in the room to make sure it was suitably blood-bespattered.

— The Wicked and the Witless, p. 303

== Setting ==
=== Cosmology ===
The underlying cosmology of the series is outlined in The Wizards and the Warriors (pgs 110 - 111). The universe of Amarl was created by a god known as The Horn. It was a world of rock, in which stones and mountains were alive. However, The Horn was killed by another god, Ameeshoth, who proceeded to remake the universe as Lemarl, imprisoning the rocks (still sentient) in their current existence. This is further expanded on in The Witchlord and the Weaponmaster, when it is explained that Ameeshoth was later attacked and destroyed by a group of Revisionary Gods. (pg 100)

=== History ===
The series originally seems to be set in a generic fantasy world, or perhaps post-apocalyptic Earth, but is later revealed to be one part of a multiverse. It is set on a planet once called Olo Malan (or, derisively Skrin), which was once part of an advanced civilisation called The Golden Gulag, which was itself part of a vast, interdimensional political entity called the Nexus. The technology of the Nexus was based upon probability manipulation.

However, 20,000 years prior to the events of the books, the Chasm Gates that linked the planet to the Nexus were accidentally destroyed. A devastating series of wars resulted (still known as The Days of Wrath), which caused untold environmental damage to the world, and reduced the population to feudal levels of technology (although some advanced machines still exist). The science of probability manipulation also devolved to the art of magic.

There was once a period of brief recovery, known as the Technic Renaissance, but this too collapsed following a war known as the Genetic Mutiny.

=== Geography ===
The novels take place across a number of continents, each with its own distinct history and ethnic groupings of humans.

- Argan. 4,000 years before the novels are set, the Wizards formed an alliance with a race of warriors and set out to enslave a mysterious entity called The Skull of the Deep South, a being that served as the hive mind for an array of dangerous monsters known as the Swarms. However, this failed, and the Swarms proceeded to invade Argan. The Wizards defeated the Swarms and built a flame trench stretching across the narrowest point of the continent (Drangsturm) to keep them out. They then proceeded to form an oppressive Empire, which ruled Argan until they were overthrown and the Empire of Wizards reformed as the Confederation of Wizards (a commercial rather than political entity). Argan during this "Age of Darkness" consists of a patch-work of independent and competing kingdoms, with the trading language of Galish serving as the lingua franca. Argan can be seen as analogous to Western Europe.
- Tameran. Lying north of Argan (separated by a channel), Tameran is largely united under the Collosnon Empire. Once ruled by a sophisticated civilisation called the Sharla, they were conquered by nomadic warriors called Yarglat. Tameran is somewhat similar to Central Asia.
- Yestron. Far to the east of Argan and Tameran, across the Great Ocean of Moana, the continent of Yestron is dominated by the Izdimir Empire. The heart of this empire is the land of Ang, a highly civilised culture that nevertheless practices slavery, human sacrifice, and tyrannical absolute rule. Ang itself appears to be modelled upon Japan, although the northern subservient kingdom of Wen Endex bears a strong similarity to Norse-era Scandinavia.
- Parengarenga. Lying midway between Argan and Yestron, Parengareanga is largely desert, vastly underpopulated and extremely poor. Of all the continents, it suffered most from the effects of war.

== Reception ==
Interzone reviewed The Wizards and the Warriors negatively, calling it overlong, uninteresting, and with poor control of tone. However, Publishers Weekly reviewed The Wordsmiths and the Warguild favourably, saying that the picaresque adventure's tone shifts "keep the reader interested and off balance, never sure what's next or why." Library Journal called it "an entertaining fantasy" about an endearing hero bumbling from disaster to disaster.

Publishers Weekly reviewed The Warwolf and the Walrus negatively, saying that despite "flashes of imagination, the reader eventually loses interest". China Miéville wrote an introductory essay for the Paizo reissue calling it a fan favorite and an anti-Bildungsroman, noting that Cook's pirates avoided both romanticism and didacticism.

In his essay, Miéville described the series as "extraordinary", "underrated", and in need of rediscovery. Adrian Tchaikovsky called the series "enormously ahead of its time", and opined that while Cook wrote female characters well, there were not enough of them. He also compared the series's humour to The Dying Earth by Jack Vance. However, in The Encyclopedia of Fantasy, John Clute said that the series included "conceits of some considerable interest", such as the odex, but that it is "considerably more incoherent than most readers will accept."
