= Primo Brands =

Beverage and food service company

Primo Brands Corporation
- Formerly: BlueTriton Brands; Primo Water Corporation
- Type: Public
- Traded as: NYSE: PRMB (Class A); Russell 1000 component
- Industry: Water supply
- Founded: November 2024, 8; 2 years ago (as Primo Brands Corporation)
- Headquarters: Tampa, Florida, U.S. (Corporate hub); Stamford, Connecticut, U.S. (Operational center)
- Area served: United States and Canada
- Key people: Eric Foss (Chairman and CEO); Robert Austin (COO); David Hass (CFO)
- Products: Water, water dispensers, refill machines, filtration equipments
- Services: Home and office water delivery, pre-filled multi-gallon, bottled water, self-service water refill, filtration
- Revenue: ▲US$6.66 billion (Fiscal Year Ended December 31, 2025)
- Operating income: ▲US$432.2 million (Fiscal Year Ended December 31, 2025)
- Net income: ▲US$80.4 million (Fiscal Year Ended December 31, 2025)
- Total assets: ▲US$10.602 billion (Fiscal Year Ended December 31, 2025)
- Total equity: ▲US$2.992 billion (Fiscal Year Ended December 31, 2025)
- Number of employees: 13,700 (December 31, 2024)
- Website: primobrands.com

Primo Brands Corporation (previously known as Cott Corporation) is an American water company offering multi-gallon bottled water, water dispensers, self-service refill water machines, and water filtration appliances. The company is headquartered in Tampa, Florida, and services residential and commercial customers across the United States, Canada, Europe and Israel.

== Founding ==
Cott Beverage Corporation was founded in 1923 by Solomon Cott, a Polish immigrant, with his sons Harry, Barney, Jack and Albert in Port Chester, New York. Harry Pencer, a clothier from Montreal, Quebec, began to import Cott sodas into Quebec in 1952. In 1955, Pencer acquired the Canadian rights to the Cott label and established Cott Beverages (Canada) Ltd., to bottle the Cott line of sodas. From 1976 to 1991, under the leadership of his son Gerry Pencer, Cott expanded its distribution throughout Canada and back into the U.S. and into Europe. In 1969, the name was changed to Cott Beverages Ltd., and in 1991 to Cott Corporation.

== Acquisitions ==
In October 2000, Concord Beverages, with its Vintage brand seltzer water, was acquired from Honickman Group. In July 2010, Cott announced its acquisition of Cliffstar Corporation, a US supplier of store-supplied and made juice beverages.

Beginning in 2014, Cott expanded via acquisitions predominantly in the bottled water industry and exited the carbonated beverages business. In May 2014, Cott completed the acquisition of Aimia Foods (Holdings) Limited, a privately held producer and distributor of hot chocolate, coffee and powdered beverages, hot and cold cereal products located in Merseyside, United Kingdom. In December 2014, Cott completed the acquisition of DSS Group, Inc. a bottled water and coffee direct-to-consumer home and office delivery services provider in the United States. The aggregate consideration was approximately $1.25 billion.

In January 2016, Cott completed the acquisition of Aquaterra, a Canadian bottled water and coffee delivery services provider, for approximately C$62 million. Eight months later, Cott acquired Eden Springs, a Euro-Israeli water and coffee deliverer, for approximately €470 million, and premium coffee roaster S&D Coffee and Tea, for approximately $355 million.

On January 30, 2018, Cott sold its carbonated soft drinks and juice bottling businesses to Refresco for US$1.25 billion. The transaction included the Cott business units in North America, the UK and Mexico. That October, Cott announced the acquisition of Mountain Valley Spring Company from Great Range Capital for $78.5 million The next February, Cott announced the sale of its soft drink concentrate production facility and RCI International division to Refresco for US$.25 billion.

In January 2020, Cott sold S&D Coffee and Tea to Westrock Coffee Company, LLC for US$405 million.

On March 2, 2020, Cott completed its purchase of Primo Water Corporation for US$775 million. As part of the purchase agreement, Cott rebranded as Primo Water Corporation and changed its ticker symbols to NYSE:PRMW and TSX:PRMW.

In July 2022, Primo Water Corporation acquired Georgia-based Highland Mountain Water for an undisclosed sum.

On November 4, 2024, Primo Water announced it was merging with BlueTriton Brands, a private equity-owned group of brands, including Poland Spring, that had spun off from Nestlé in 2021. The combined entity, known as Primo Brands, began trading on the NYSE on November 11, 2024, under ticker symbol PRMB.
