= Hugh Cook (science fiction author) =

British fantasy writer

Hugh Walter Gilbert Cook (9 August 1956 – 8 November 2008) was a cult author, whose works blend fantasy and science fiction. He is best known for his series Chronicles of an Age of Darkness.

== Biography ==
Cook was born in Billericay in Essex, England in 1956. After spending his early childhood in England, in 1962 he moved to Ocean Island (now known as Banaba) in Kiribati. His experiences of English castles and of life on an equatorial island influenced his writing. In 1964, he moved to New Zealand, where he was educated. He later joined the New Zealand Army as a medic, where he served for ten years, reaching the rank of sergeant.

Cook's first novel, Plague Summer, was published in 1980, when he was 24. It concerned drug running in New Zealand during an outbreak of foot and mouth disease. He left the army to write, and published The Shift in 1986. That comic science fiction novel involved an alien invasion and a machine that altered human history. Under the title After Advent, it was a finalist in the 1985 Young Writers' Competition run by The Times and Jonathan Cape.

Between 1986 and 1992, Cook wrote the ten-novel series Chronicles of an Age of Darkness. Disappointing sales prevented the publication of further volumes (up to 60 were planned) and Cook stopped publishing for some time.

In 1997, he moved to Japan, and lived in Yokohama with his wife and daughter, where he taught English. Between 1998 and 2005, he published mainly through his website, Zen Virus. His online works encompassed poetry, short stories, flash fiction, and several novels, including To Find and Wake the Dreamer and Oceans of Light, a trilogy.

In 2005, he underwent chemotherapy and radiation treatment for non-Hodgkin's lymphoma. He wrote a medical memoir, Cancer Patient, recounting that experience. Following a relapse, he died on 8 November 2008, in a hospice in Auckland.

== Bibliography ==
=== Chronicles of an Age of Darkness ===
- The Wizards and the Warriors, published in the US as Wizard War (1986) ISBN 0-552-12566-0
- The Wordsmiths and the Warguild, published in the US as The Questing Hero and The Hero's Return (1987) ISBN 0-552-13130-X
- The Women and the Warlords, published in the US as The Oracle (1987) ISBN 0-552-13131-8
- The Walrus and the Warwolf, of which the first part was published in the US as Lords of the Sword (1988) ISBN 0-552-13327-2
- The Wicked and the Witless (1989) ISBN 0-552-13439-2
- The Wishstone and the Wonderworkers (1990) ISBN 0-552-13536-4
- The Wazir and the Witch (1990) ISBN 0-552-13537-2
- The Werewolf and the Wormlord (1991) ISBN 0-552-13538-0
- The Worshippers and the Way (1992) ISBN 0-552-13848-7
- The Witchlord and the Weaponmaster (1992) ISBN 0-552-13849-5

The series broadly tells the story of the events leading to the end of a dark age in a fantasy world. The idea for the series began with an outline for a series of twenty novels. This would have been followed by two equally long series, The Chronicles of an Age of Wrath, and The Chronicles of an Age of Heroes. This sixty-volume scheme ended with the publication of the tenth volume because of disappointing sales.

In 2026 the Chronicles of an Age of Darkness were relaunched for publication by Zenphos Press.

=== Other novels ===
- Plague Summer (1980) ISBN 9780709187073
- The Shift (1987) ISBN 9780394747392

This describes a postnuclear world where orange intelligent reptilian extraterrestrials known as the Spang have conquered the Earth through the use of a device called the Shift, which controls movement through space and time and can alter history. They are in league with Iridian Troy, the most powerful human on Earth, who has an overprotective attitude towards his daughter. He is opposed by his guilt-ridden over-intellectual employee Gabriel Arkhangel and his daughter's lover Clive Sendarka, whom he pursues using all the resources available to the human race. Humans are regularly exported to a slave colony known as Deep Six, which is far out in interstellar space.

- Oceans of Light series
  - West of Heaven
  - East of Hell
  - North of Paradise

A fantasy trilogy that Cook finished in the 1990s, set in the realm of Chalakanesia.

- To Find and Wake the Dreamer (2005)

A fantasy novel about the war on terror. In the city state of Oolong Morblock, where a certain proportion of the people have a natural ability to cause themselves to explode, in effect making them potential suicide bombers, Ibrahim Chess tries to find the middle road: to steer a course of moderation and sanity in a world which is going mad, and where the civil peace is threatened by the increasingly intolerant fanaticism of the conflict between the minority group to which Ibrahim belongs, the astrals, and the city state's dominant group, the norms.

- Bamboo Horses

A murder mystery with fantasy elements set in the land of Nizon, where people eat with scissors rather than with chopsticks. Fantasy in a modern environment complete with computers and cellphones. Business manager Ken Udamana, a husband and a father of two, believes that someone is planning to murder him and takes a shot at find out who. This novel contains some violence and touches on the subject of an adulterous relationship.

=== Other works ===
- Cancer Patient (2005) ISBN 9781411653870

A medical memoir written during his struggle with non-Hodgkin's lymphoma (cancer of the brain and spinal cord). Cancer Patient is a compilation of his experiences with the disease and his reflections upon the vicissitudes of life.

=== Short stories ===
- "Consenting Adults" 1988
- "The Kidney Bean Diet" 1998
- "Consequences" 1998
- "Heroes of the Third Millennium" Fantasy & Science Fiction, December 1998, Vol. 95, Iss. 6, p. 99.
- "Outing" 1998
- "Night on Bear Mountain" 1999
- "An Alien in Japan" 1999
- "Howie Glenst and the Woman Made From Glass" 1999
- "The Succubus" 1999
- "The Earth is Flat" 1999
- "Her Mint-Green Breath" 1999
- "Remembering Nagasaki" 1999
- "Mountaineering Complex" 1999
- "Machine Readable" 1999
- "Golf Course" 1999
- "Sweetness and Light" 2000
- "Locked Out" 2000
- "Night in the Month of Madness" 2000
- "In the Month of Lombok" 2000
- "Marooned on Footbone" 2000
- "Lost in the Moid" Challenging Destiny No. 10, July 2000 (St. Marys, Canada, ISSN 1206-6656) (pp 7–27).
- "Gally Smith and the Massacre of the Orcs" 2000
- "Boxes" 2000
- "Portrait of a Woman with her Hair on Fire" 2000
- "The Invention of Stones" 2000
- "Basque" 2000
- "Other Lives" 2000
- "Swiss Toys" 2001
- "Limbo Larry" 2001
- "Gap Music" 2001
- "That Nightmare Known as Life" 2001
- "Wet Leaves on the Track" 2001
- "Hunting Andrew" 2001
- "A Totally Ordinary Young Woman" 2001
- "The Warden of Jestabel Zee" 2001
- "Pogy Bobs and the Hyena of Death" 2001
- "Golgo Molgo" 2001
- "The Trial of Edgar Allan Poe" 2002
- "Cultural Correctness" 2002
- "Flowers for the Lady" 2002
- "Views of Texas" 2002
- "Bad Sex" 2003
- "Patriots" 2003
- "The Suicide Bomber" 2003
- "Quilting" 2003
- "UFO Invasion – the Truth about Alien Abductions!!" 2003
- "Acorns" 2003
- "The Transfer of Patient Twenty-Seven" 2003
- "Live on Channel 10" 2003
- "On the Wings of a Cockroach" 2003
- "The Man on the Balcony" 2003
- "Sign on the Dotted Line" 2003
- "Life on Planet Earth" 2003
- "Saint George and Ibrahim" 2003
- "Cherry Normal" 2003
- "The Rat" 2003
- "Upgrade" 2003
- "A Subway Ride" 2003
- "The Wrath of Babril Hestek" 2003
- "Too Far From Home" 2003
- "The Angel of the Seventh Apocalypse" 2003
- "The Triumph of Japanese English" 2003
- "The Naked Succubus Sex Slave Murders" 2003
- "Harriet's Armpit" 2003
- "House Hunting" 2003
- "The Orc's Armpit" 2003
- "His Name Was Mac" 2003
- "The Magniloquator" 2003
- "Honeymoon" 2004
- "You're in my Body" 2004
- "The Executed Man" 2004
- "The Wind in his Mouth" 2004
- "Jorgelvace" 2004
- "Fulfillable Wishes" 2004
- "Yenlow's Renewal 52" 2004
- "Grapefruit Perfume Bicycle Birthmark" 2004
- "Escape from Hell" 2004
- "Implantation" 2004
- "Shotgun Al's Last Picnic" 2004
- "Maggots" 2004
- "The Therapy of the Great God Mulchagola" 2004
- "Lost in his Bedroom" 2004
- "Daddy's Little Girl" 2004
- "A Better Life" 2004
- "Suicide Hotel" 2004
- "Newlyweds" 2004
- "Burning Louty" 2004
- "Hot Cardboard" 2004
- "Santa Claus, Sex Criminal" 2004
- "Eating Jesus Christ" 2005

=== Chronicles of an Age of Darkness stories ===
- "Invasion of the Chickens" 1999
- "Vorn the Gladiator" 2000
- "A Pilgrimage to Plaka Kalada" 2003
- "The Secret History of Lord Dreldragon" 2003
- "The Dragon Zenphos" 2003

=== Oolong Morblock stories ===
- "Life and Death in Oolong Jalabar" 2000
- "Astral Talent" 2001
- "Life and Death in Oolong Morblock" 2003
- "A Genie at Work" 2003

=== Chalakanesia stories ===
- "The Ghosting of Heineman Jubiladilia" 2000
- "Diving on the Wreck" 2002
