= Thalamic glioma =

- Specialty: Neuro-oncology, neurosurgery
- Causes: Unknown
- Prevention: Unknown
- Treatment: Watchful waiting, radiation therapy, chemotherapy, resection
- Prognosis: Two year survival rate 19.7% (adults), pediatric five year survival rate 15-25% (high grade astrocytoma) or 40% (low grade astroyctoma)

Thalamic gliomas are very rare, deep-seated, generally high-grade glial neoplasms that form in the thalamus, representing 1–5% of all pediatric brain tumors. Because of their difficult to reach position, they are a unique and difficult challenge for neuro-oncologists and neurosurgeons.

== Diagnosis ==
Thalamic gliomas are most often discovered on magnetic resonance imaging following symptoms, with the most common presenting symptom being motor deficit. While a definitive diagnosis of the neoplasm cannot be made without a biopsy of the tumor, biopsies have historically been avoided due to the extreme sensitivity of the region.

=== Bithalamic glioma ===
A notable variant of thalamic gliomas are bithalamic gliomas. Bithalamic gliomas cross the interthalamic adhesion and occupy space in both thalami. These have poorer outcomes than unilateral thalamic gliomas.

== Treatment ==
Unless a thalamic glioma shows aggressive behavior, they are often treated with a "watch and wait" approach until signs of growth occur. Thalamic gliomas can be treated with radiotherapy, chemotherapy, and/or resection.

=== Resection ===
Thalamic gliomas are among the most difficult challenges a neurosurgeon faces today. Historically, thalamic gliomas were considered inoperable. Advances in neurosurgical technology have opened up the thalamic area to resection, but conservative approaches remain popular. Microsurgical approaches are well suited for thalamic gliomas.

== Prognosis ==
Thalamic gliomas have a poor prognosis. In adult patients, the overall two-year survival rate is 19.7%, with low grade tumors holding a two-year survival rate of 31.0% and high-grade tumors holding a two-year survival rate of 16.5%. In pedtiatric patients, low-grade astrocytomas held a five-year survival rate of 40% while high-grade astrocyte tumors held a five-year survival rate that varies between 15% and 25%. Strangely, pediatric thalamic oligodendrogliomas appear to have a far worse prognosis than thalamic astrocytomas, with a three-year survival rate of 14% in one series.

Higher Karnovsky performance status and CSF diversion are good prognostic markers in cases that match the criteria for glioblastoma.

While the H3K27m mutation that is the distinct marker of a diffuse midline glioma is generally a very poor prognostic factor, it is unusually associated with slightly higher rates of survival in adult thalalmic glioma patients.

== Pathology ==
Thalamic gliomas are often but not exclusively diffuse midline gliomas; other varieties of glial tumor can develop in this region.

== Prominent patients ==
- Tammi Terrell (1945–1970), Motown singer that died from an "acorn size" tumor in her thalamus
