= List of Keurig Dr Pepper brands =

This is a list of brands owned by Keurig Dr Pepper.

== Products by country ==
=== United States ===
==== Sodas ====
- 7 Up
- A&W Root Beer
- A&W Cream Soda
- Cactus Cooler
- Canada Dry
- Canfield's
- Crush
- Diet Rite
- Dr Pepper
- Hires Root Beer
- IBC Root Beer
- Mr & Mrs T
- RC Cola
- Schweppes
- Squirt
- Stewart's Fountain Classics
- Sun Drop
- Sunkist
- Venom
- Vernors
- Wink

==== Juices ====
- Bai Brands LLC
- Clamato
- Hawaiian Punch
- Margaritaville
- Mott's
- Nantucket Nectars
- Nehi
- ReaLemon
- Rose's
- Snapple
- Yoo-hoo

==== Waters ====
- Dejà Blue
- Peñafiel

==== Coffees ====
- Diedrich Coffee
- Green Mountain
- Stumptown Coffee Roasters
- Timothy's World Coffee
- Tully's Coffee
- Van Houtte

==== Brewing machines ====
- Keurig

=== Canada ===
==== Sodas ====
- Canada Dry (club soda, tonic water, ginger ale, diet ginger ale, cranberry flavored ginger ale, green tea ginger ale)
- C'plus (orange, C'plus Wink)
- Crush (cream soda, birch beer, grape, lime, orange, pineapple)
- Dr Pepper and Diet Dr Pepper
- Hires Root Beer and cream soda
- RC Cola
- Schweppes (tonic water, ginger ale, diet ginger ale)
- Vernors
- Stewart's Fountain Classics (Root Beer, Orange & Cream, Wishniak, Black Cherry, Key Lime, Cream Soda)
- Golden Cockerel (ginger beer)
- Sussex Golden Ginger Ale

==== Juices ====
- Snapple
- Mott's Clamato (regular, the Works, Extra Spicy)
- Mott's Garden Cocktail (Regular & Low Sodium)
- Mr & Mrs T (daiquiri, margarita, pina colada)
- ReaLemon
- ReaLime
- Rose's Lime Cordial
- Rose's Cocktail Infusions (cranberry, blueberry, green apple)
- Rose's Grenadine
- Mott's Fruitsations (Fruit snacks, apple sauces, juices and Fruit with Supplement)

==== Coffees ====
- Green Mountain
- Timothy's World Coffee
- Van Houtte

=== Mexico ===
- Peñafiel Mineral Water
- Peñafiel Fruit Sodas
- Peñafiel Naturel- Low calorie fruit sodas sweetened with Splenda.
- Peñafiel Frutal- Peñafiel Mineral Water with a hint of fruit flavor (strawberry, apple), sweetened with Splenda.
- Peñafiel Twist- Peñafiel Mineral Water with a hint of lime.
- Squirt, Squirt Light and Squirt Rusa (salt and lime). (distributed by Pepsi in some states and by Aga in other states).
- Canada Dry (distributed by Pepsi in some areas)
- Aguafiel purified water, frutal (Jamaica, lime, mango, orange) and frutal cero (Jamaica, apple) sweetened with Splenda.
- Clamato
- Crush
- Snapple
- Schweppes
- Dr Pepper
