= Dr Pepper (disambiguation) =

Dr Pepper is a carbonated soft drink.

Dr Pepper may also refer to:

== Beverages ==
- Dublin Dr Pepper, a variety with cane sugar bottled in Dublin, Texas
- Flaming Doctor Pepper, flammable cocktail mixing Amaretto with high proof liquor

== Companies ==
- Keurig Dr Pepper, an American beverage company
  - Dr Pepper Snapple Group Inc., a business unit of Keurig Dr Pepper based in Plano, Texas
  - Dr Pepper/Seven Up, a predecessor company founded in 1986
  - Dr Pepper Snapple Bottling Group, a predecessor company founded in 2006

== People ==
- John Henry Pepper, a British inventor
- Dr. William Pepper, American physician
- Dr. William F. Pepper, American lawyer

== Sports venues ==
- Dr Pepper Arena, a facility in Frisco, Texas that hosts Dallas Stars hockey and basketball
- Dr Pepper Ballpark, a minor-league baseball stadium in Frisco, Texas
