= Hyman Golden =

American businessman (1923–2008)

- Born: June 11, 1923; Passaic, New Jersey
- Died: September 14, 2008 (aged 85); Great Neck, New York
- Known for: co-founder of Snapple
- Spouse: Mitzi Marsh
- Family: Leonard Marsh (brother-in-law)

Hyman Golden (June 11, 1923 – September 14, 2008) was one of the co-founders of the Snapple Beverage Corporation (now part of the Dr Pepper Snapple Group) and was the company's chairman when the firm's juice drinks and teas attained national attention in the late 1980s.

== Biography ==
Golden was born to a Jewish family in Passaic, New Jersey, to an immigrant father from Romania, and grew up in Middle Village, Queens. He served in the United States Air Force. Golden had little formal education and one of his early jobs was as a window washer for his father. He worked as a business broker and later founded a maintenance company together with Leonard Marsh, his wife Mitzi's brother.

Golden co-founded Unadulterated Food Products in 1972 to sell fruit juices to health food stores, together with Marsh and Arnold Greenberg, who himself operated a health food store in Manhattan's East Village. Golden's partners, Marsh and Goldberg, had been childhood friends since the early 1930s, who had both attended PS 165 and Samuel J. Tilden High School in Brooklyn. The word "Snapple" was introduced for a lines of drinks introduced in the early 1980s and is derived from a carbonated apple juice. The firm's iced tea line, introduced in 1987, led to increased sales.

The company, originally headquartered in Brooklyn, relocated to Valley Stream, New York, where the partners lived. As the company grew exponentially the firm was bought out by Thomas H. Lee Company in April 1992 for $140 million, with the three original partners retaining a one-third share of the company which had annual sales of $100 million the previous year. The company went public in December 1992 for $10 per share, split two-for-one in 1993, and was bought out by the Quaker Oats Company in November 1994 for $1.7 billion, with $1.1 paying for the 68% share in the firm held by Thomas H. Lee Company, along with Hyman and his original two partners. The company changed hands several times over the years and is now a part of Keurig Dr Pepper. Golden retired as Snapple's chairman in 1995.

He died on September 14, 2008, in Great Neck, New York of complications from a stroke.
