= Raging Cow =

Line of milk-based beverages

Raging Cow was a line of milk-based beverages created by Dr Pepper/Seven Up. The five flavors were Berry Mixed Up, Chocolate Caramel Craze, Chocolate Insanity, Jamocha Frenzy, and Piña Colada Chaos.

The mascot of the beverage, an angry cow fed up with "boring milk", was also known as The Raging Cow.

== Marketing controversy ==
After the introduction of the beverage in March 2003, there was controversy over the strategy of marketing agency Richards Interactive to capitalize on the then-novel weblog phenomenon. Along with whimsical blogs "authored" by the product's barnyard mascots, six teenagers were hired to promote the drink in otherwise authentic blogs. Although the intent was to gain a stronger, more credible connection with the young target audience, adult observers saw the tactic as disingenuous and subversive and staged a boycott, which attracted press coverage. The campaign is now regarded as a failure.

== Status of the beverage ==
Since the protest began, the official Raging Cow website has gone offline. An official webpage about the beverage still existed at the Dr Pepper/Seven Up website until mid-2006. At first, the Raging Cow beverages were only available in a few cities across the United States, an example of test marketing. Additional information about the distribution of the beverage was never released. Currently, many Raging Cow vending machines are stocked with other Dr Pepper/Seven Up products. No official message was ever given regarding the end of production of the drink.
