= Stewart's Fountain Classics =

American brand of premium soft drinks

Stewart's Root Beer
- Type: Soft drink: Root beer
- Manufacturer: Keurig Dr Pepper
- Distributor: Dr Pepper Snapple Bottling Group & other
- Origin: Mansfield, Ohio, U.S.
- Introduced: 1924; 102 years ago
- Variants: Diet Root Beer

Stewart's Birch Beer
- Type: Soft drink: Birch beer
- Manufacturer: Keurig Dr Pepper
- Distributor: Dr Pepper Snapple Bottling Group & other
- Introduced: 2001; 25 years ago

Stewart's Cream Soda
- Type: Soft drink
- Manufacturer: Keurig Dr Pepper
- Distributor: Dr Pepper Snapple Bottling Group & other
- Introduced: 1992; 34 years ago
- Variants: Cherries 'n Cream, Orange 'n Cream

Stewart's Fountain Classics is an American brand of premium soft drinks.

== History ==
Stewart's are nostalgic "old fashioned" fountain sodas, having originated at the Stewart's Restaurants, a chain of root beer stands started in 1924 by Frank Stewart in Mansfield, Ohio. In 1990, the bottling rights to Stewart's were acquired by the Cable Car Beverage Corporation. Cream Soda and Ginger Beer flavors were introduced in 1992. Other flavors have been added since then. In November 1997 Cable Car Beverage Corporation was purchased by Triarc. Cadbury Schweppes PLC acquired the Stewart's brands in 2000 along with Snapple and Mistic Brands for $1.45 billion.

Stewart's drinks come in 12 fl. oz. (355 ml) glass bottles with twist-off tops. The bottles of some flavors are tinted amber, while the others are clear.

== Flavors ==
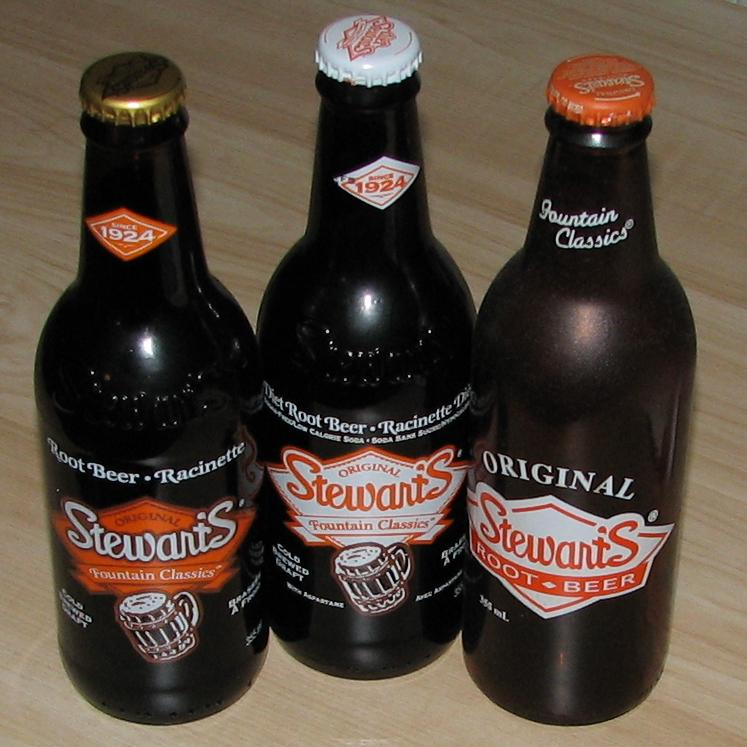
Various Stewart's root beer bottles

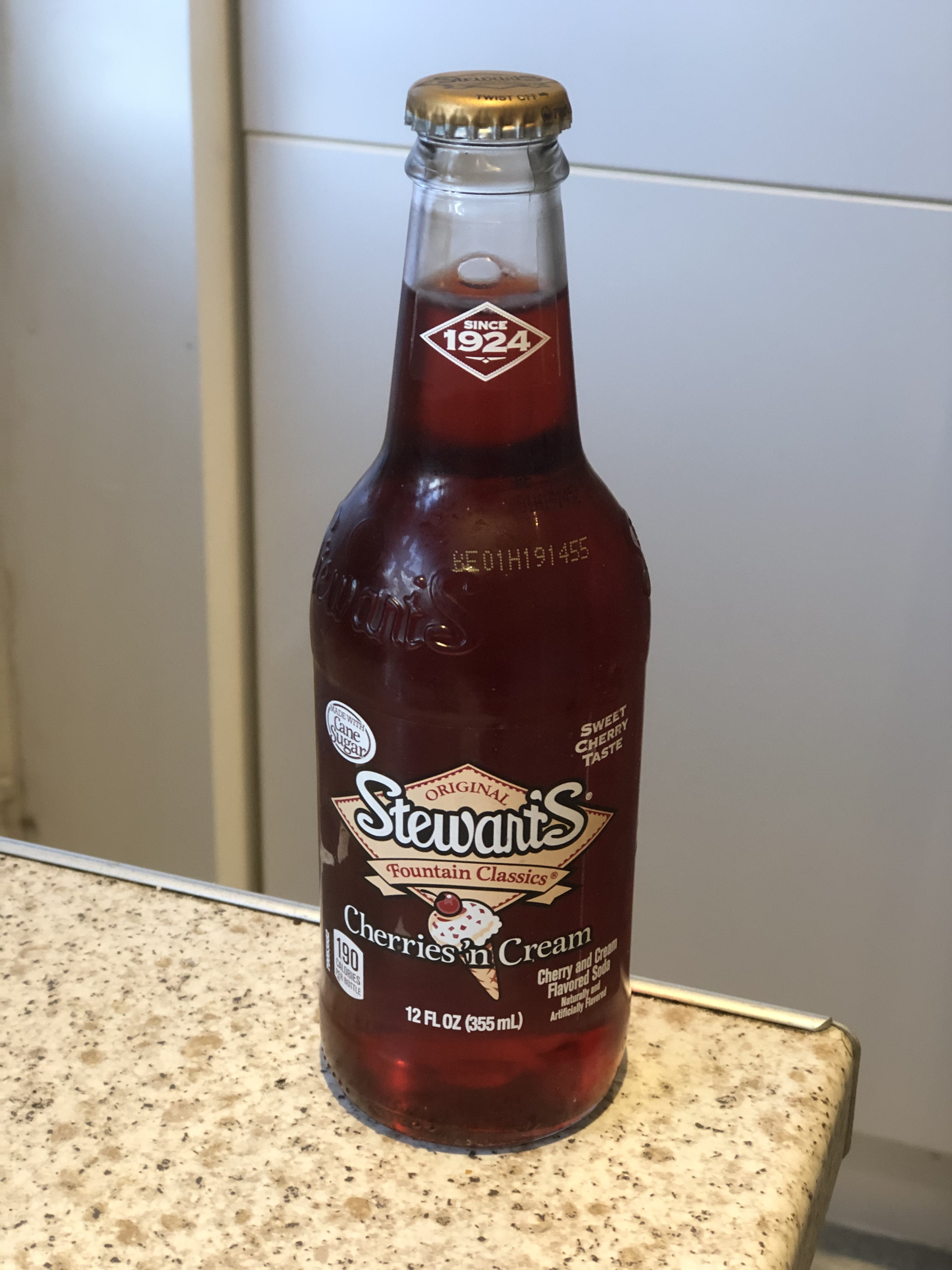
A bottle of Stewart's Cherries'n'Cream

- Root Beer
- Diet Root Beer
- Birch Beer
- Ginger Beer
- Cream soda
- Diet Cream Soda
- Draft Cola
- Diet Draft Cola
- Black Cherry Wishniak
- Peach
- Grape
- Lemon Meringue
- Key Lime
- Cherries 'n Cream
- Strawberries 'n Cream
- Orange 'n Cream
- Diet Orange 'n Cream

== See also ==
- Stewart's Restaurants
