= Green Mountain Coffee Roasters =

American coffee company

Keurig Green Mountain
- Formerly: Green Mountain Coffee Roasters (1981-2014)
- Type: Public
- Traded as: Nasdaq: GMCR
- Industry: Coffee
- Founded: 1979; 47 years ago
- Founder: Doug and Jaime Baine
- Fate: Renamed as Keurig Green Mountain, Inc. (2014); successor combined with Dr Pepper Snapple Group to form Keurig Dr Pepper (2018)
- Successor: Keurig Green Mountain → Keurig Dr Pepper
- Headquarters: Waterbury, Vermont, U.S.
- Area served: North America
- Products: Coffee; single-serve coffee (K-Cup pods via Keurig)

Green Mountain Coffee Roasters (GMCR) was an American coffee company founded in 1979 in Waitsfield, Vermont, and later headquartered in Waterbury, Vermont. Initially established as a specialty coffee roaster serving local markets, the company expanded nationally through the 1990s and 2000s, later focusing on single-serve coffee through its ownership of Keurig. In 2014, the company was renamed Keurig Green Mountain, Inc., reflecting its focus on single-serve brewing systems. In 2018, it merged with Dr Pepper Snapple Group to form Keurig Dr Pepper.

== History ==
=== Founding and early growth (1979–1990s) ===
Green Mountain Coffee Roasters (GMCR) started as a small coffee business in November 1979 owned by Doug and Jamie Baine in Waitsfield, Vermont. In 1981, entrepreneur Bob Stiller acquired a two-thirds stake in the company with a partner after discovering the company's coffee at a Vermont ski resort. About a year later, Stiller became the sole owner of GMCR.

The business became profitable after about four years. In its early expansion, the company broadened its customer base across retail and food-service channels and used low-cost promotions and mail-order to reach consumers. GMCR implemented systems to track customer orders and roasting parameters and integrated distribution, manufacturing, sales, and personnel functions, including adopting PeopleSoft in 1997.

During the 1990s, the company expanded its operations through regional wholesale channels and operated branded cafés. By 1991, the company had expanded to seven retail outlets and 1,000 wholesale clients, generating $11 million in sales and $200,000 in profits. By 1993, GMCR had further grown to 2,400 wholesale accounts with approximately $10 million in sales. In the same year, the company began trading publicly under the ticker GMCR.

In 1993, GMCR went public under Bob Stiller's direction, raising capital to expand operations and increase roasting capacity. The IPO proceeds funded a $4 million investment in plant and equipment, including advanced packaging technology, while the company brought in experienced managers to oversee expanded operations. That same year GMCR first invested in Keurig.

The company began exporting products to Canada and Taiwan in 1994. GMCR expanded into specialty coffee stores and entered into agreements with brands such as LL Bean, Weight Watchers International, and Staples.

In 1997, GMCR began distribution to offices in the northeastern United States through a deal with Poland Spring. In 1998, the company closed its 12 retail shops and shifted to direct-mail, online, and wholesale distribution. GMCR started expanding to include exports to Great Britain by 1999.

=== 2000 - 2006 ===
By the early 2000s, GMCR began promoting ethical sourcing programs, including commitments to Fair Trade-certified products. In 2001, the company acquired Frontier Organic Coffee. In 2002, it signed an agreement to sell fair trade coffee under the Newman's Own Organics label. In late 2005, GMCR reached an agreement to sell its Newman's Own Organics Blend coffee in more than 600 McDonald's restaurants in New England and Upstate New York.

Between 1993 and 2006, GMCR gradually increased its ownership stake in Keurig through a series of investments and acquisitions. By 2006, the company held a 43% ownership share in Keurig, leading to GMCR's complete acquisition of the single-cup brewing systems manufacturer.

=== Acquisitions and expansion (2009–2010) ===
In March 2009, GMCR purchased Seattle-based Tully's Coffee brand and its wholesale coffee business for $40.3 million. In November and December of the same year, the company acquired Timothy's World Coffee and Diedrich Coffee respectively. In 2010, GMCR purchased Canadian coffee roaster Van Houtte for C$915 million, increasing its roasting, licensing, and distribution operations in the United States and Canada.

In 2010, GMCR Canada was founded, and officially became the Canadian Business Unit of Green Mountain Coffee Roasters, Inc. the following year. It was renamed Keurig Canada Inc. in March 2014.

=== Licensing agreements and collaborations (2011–2015) ===
In February 2011, GMCR announced an agreement with Dunkin' Donuts to produce Dunkin’ Donuts coffee in single-serve K-Cup pods compatible with Keurig Single-Cup Brewers. Some participating Dunkin’ Donuts locations have also sold Keurig brewers. The following month, the company also signed a licensing agreement with Starbucks to produce Starbucks-branded coffee and tea in K-Cup format for Keurig brewing systems, with Starbucks stores also beginning to sell Keurig machines. In December 2012, Brian Kelley, a former Coca-Cola executive, became CEO of GMCR.

In March 2014, GMCR changed its corporate name to Keurig Green Mountain, Inc., to reflect the centrality of the Keurig platform to its business model, although its stock market symbol remained GMCR. That same year, The Coca-Cola Company acquired a minority stake in GMCR and entered into a multi-year agreement for the Keurig Cold beverage system, designed for countertop preparation of cold beverages.

=== Final acquisitions and merger (2015–2018) ===
In 2015, Dr Pepper Snapple Group agreed to supply beverage brands for the Keurig cold beverage platform, following the 2014 agreement with The Coca Cola company.

In December 2015, Keurig Green Mountain was acquired by an investor group led by JAB Holding Company. The transaction closed in March 2016, taking Keurig Green Mountain private. In 2016, Robert Gamgort, who was previously the CEO of Pinnacle Foods, was appointed CEO of Keurig Green Mountain, succeeding Brian Kelley.

In June 2016, the company discontinued its Keurig at-home cold beverage system, offering refunds to consumers.

In July 2018, Keurig Green Mountain merged with Dr Pepper Snapple Group to form Keurig Dr Pepper, creating a major North American beverage company that resumed public trading.

== Community involvement ==
A Stewardship Program promoting sustainability was established in 1992. In 1997, the company introduced a biodegradable bag for bulk coffee purchases, and in 2006, it launched the ecotainer, a hot beverage cup made from renewable materials.

In 2000, Green Mountain began purchasing Fair Trade coffee. It developed long-term relationships with coffee-growing suppliers, funded poverty alleviation projects in coffee-growing communities, invested in micro-loan programs for farmers, and implemented employee volunteer and community engagement initiatives.

In 2005, the company adopted the United Nations' Global Reporting Initiative. Keurig Green Mountain was included in the EPA's National Top 100 of green power users in the U.S. in 2013 for its sustainable practices.

== Governance ==
Bob Stiller served as GMCR's president and chief executive officer from 1981 to 2007, followed by Lawrence J. Blanford from 2007 to 2012. Brian Kelley held the position from 2012 to 2016, after which Robert Gamgort became CEO. Gamgort remained in the role through the 2018 merger of Keurig Green Mountain and Dr Pepper Snapple Group, after which Keurig Green Mountain ceased to operate as a separate company.

== Operations ==
Through its ownership of Keurig, GMCR developed and marketed single-serve coffee brewers and proprietary beverage pods, regularly introducing updated brewer models and new formats. The company's business model relied heavily on licensing agreements with major beverage producers. Key collaborations included agreements with Starbucks (2011), The Coca-Cola Company (2014), and Dr Pepper Snapple Group (2015).

The company introduced multiple brewer models and product lines, such as the Keurig Rivo espresso machine (2012) developed with Luigi Lavazza, and the BOLT Carafe Brewing System (2013) for office markets. In 2014, Keurig Green Mountain released the Keurig 2.0, which used digital restrictions to limit unlicensed pods and could brew single cups or carafes.

Between 2015 and 2016, KGM expanded its line of products with recyclable K-Mug pods, the compact K200 brewer, and collaborations such as General Electric’s refrigerator-integrated Keurig system.

== Controversies ==
In September 2010, GMCR disclosed that the Securities and Exchange Commission had requested information regarding its revenue recognition practices and relationship with distributor M. Block & Sons. The company stated it was cooperating with the inquiry, though analysts maintained that its accounting practices appeared sound despite a subsequent decline in share price. In 2014, the Securities and Exchange Commission concluded its investigation into the company's accounting practices without taking enforcement action.

A class action lawsuit was filed against the company concerning inventory handling practices, with an amended complaint submitted on April 30, 2012. The plaintiffs alleged that the company had overstated product demand and understated inventory levels. In June 2018, Keurig Green Mountain, Inc. agreed to a $36.5 million settlement.

After KGM announced the Keurig 2.0 brewer in 2014, competitors and consumers challenged the system’s lock-out of unlicensed pods in antitrust litigation. Keurig later agreed to a $31 million settlement with consumer purchasers in the antitrust litigation; the company denied liability.

Between 2014 and 2017, the company faced criticism from environmental advocates regarding the environmental impact of non-recyclable K-Cups. In response, Keurig Green Mountain has stated that newer K-Cup products are recyclable when disassembled. The company's 2014 Sustainability Report set a goal for 100% recyclable K-Cup pods by 2020. The issue later led to consumer litigation, which ended in a $10 million settlement that received final court approval in 2023.

In 2016, Keurig Green Mountain agreed to pay a $5.8 million civil penalty to settle U.S. Consumer Product Safety Commission allegations that it failed to promptly report a defect in its MINI Plus Brewing Systems linked to burn injuries. The company had issued a recall for about 6.6 million units of the said device in 2014, and the settlement also required implementation of a compliance program; it was provisionally approved by the Commission in a 4–1 vote.

== See also ==
- Single-serve coffee container
- List of coffee companies
