= DPSU =

DPSU may refer to:

- Dr Pepper/Seven Up, an American soft-drink manufacturing company
- State Border Guard Service of Ukraine, the border guard of Ukraine
