= Leonard Marsh (businessman) =

American businessman (1933–2013)

- Born: January 5, 1933; Brooklyn, New York, US
- Died: May 21, 2013 (aged 80); Manhasset, New York, US
- Known for: Co-founding Snapple Beverage Corporation

Leonard Marsh (January 5, 1933 – May 21, 2013) was an American businessman who co-founded the Snapple Beverage Corporation (now part of the Dr Pepper Snapple Group) in 1972. Marsh co-founded Snapple, which was originally known as Unadulterated Food Products, with his brother-in-law, Hyman Golden, and childhood friend, Arnold Greenberg.

== Biography ==
Marsh, whose father was a cobbler, was born to a Jewish immigrants from Russia on January 5, 1933, in Brooklyn, New York. He was raised in the Brownsville neighborhood of Brooklyn and graduated from the former Samuel J. Tilden High School in East Flatbush. He sold eggs and chickens after his high school graduation. He also operated a window washing business with his brother-in-law, Hyman Golden.

In 1972, Marsh partnered with his brother-in-law, Hyman Golden, and friend, Arnold Greenberg, to found Unadulterated Food Products, which would later become known as Snapple during the early 1980s. Unadulterated Food Products was originally conceived as a part-time venture to supply fruit juices to health food stores. The company, which was based in Valley Stream, New York, was one of the first to manufacture juices and other beverages made from natural ingredients. Unsure if the business would succeed, Marsh and Golden continued to operate their window washing business, while Greenberg remained at his health food store in Manhattan's East Village. Marsh, who had previously sold eggs and washed windows, knew little about juice or other beverages at the time. In a 1989 interview with Crain's New York Business, Marsh admitted that when they launched the small business he knew "as much about juice as about making an atom bomb."

The company changed its name to Snapple, named after one of its early apple juice product, in the 1980s. Marsh served as a longtime president and chief executive officer of Snapple. He established a network of more than three bottlers in all fifty U.S. states. Once nicknamed "Mr. Nice Guy" by Beverage Industry, a trade publication, Marsh was considered a pioneer of employee-friendly policies in corporate America. Under Marsh, Snapple offered flexible work schedules to let workers care for children and elderly relatives. Marsh and his business partners also purchased a company bus to transport workers who did not own cars to Snapple's new facility when the company moved its corporate headquarters from Valley Stream, New York, to New York City in 1990.

Sales increased throughout the 1980s and the company expanded its product line, offering bottled iced tea beginning in 1987. Thomas H. Lee Co., an investment firm, purchased Snapple in 1992 for $140 million and retained Marsh as the company's CEO. Annual sales reached $674 million by 1994, the same year that Snapple was acquired by Quaker Oats Company for $1.7 billion. Marsh remained at Snapple as Executive Vice President of Planning for several years after Quaker's acquisition of the company.

Leonard Marsh died at his home in Manhasset, New York, on May 21, 2013, at the age of 80. He was survived by his wife, Marian Ebner, whom he had been married to for fifty-seven years; three children, Robin Ross, Bradley and Peter; and eight grandchildren. Marsh was the last surviving co-founder of Snapple. Hyman Golden died in 2008 and Arnold Greenberg died in 2012.
