= Mott's =

American fruit-based product company

Mott's Inc.
- Industry: Juices and sauces
- Founded: 1842; 184 years ago
- Founder: Samuel R. Mott
- Headquarters: Frisco, Texas
- Products: Apple juice Apple sauce
- Owner: Keurig Dr Pepper
- Website: www.motts.com

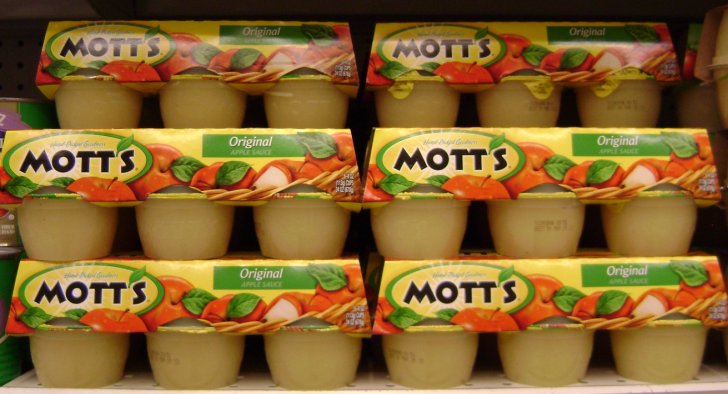
Mott's apple sauce

Mott's (/ˌmɒts/ MAWTS) is an American company involved primarily in producing apple-based products, particularly juices and sauces.

The company was founded in 1842 by Samuel R. Mott of Bouckville, New York, who made apple cider and vinegar. In 1914, the company merged with the W. B. Duffy Cider Company to become Duffy-Mott. In early 2006 all of Mott's beverage brands were folded into Cadbury Schweppes Americas Beverages. In 2008 Mott's was demerged from Cadbury Schweppes plc, to operate as a separate unit of Keurig Dr Pepper.

== History ==
The Mott's company was founded in 1842 by Samuel R. Mott of Bouckville, New York, who made apple cider and vinegar. Mott products were exhibited at Philadelphia's Centennial Exposition in 1876 and Chicago's World's Columbian Exposition in 1893.

After the death of one of his sons, Samuel retired from the apple business altogether and sold the company to his remaining sons, John and Frederick, with the company being renamed to Genesee Fruit Company. Following John’s death, Frederick sold the company to the W.B. Duffy Cider Company in 1900, with the two companies merging in 1914 to become Duffy-Mott.

Eventually, during the mid-1970s, the company was acquired by the American Tobacco Company (later American Brands) and became its subsidiary. In 1982, Cadbury Schweppes purchased the Duffy-Mott Company. Four years later, the company shortened its name to simply Mott’s Inc.

In 1991, Mott’s introduced fruit-flavored apple sauces, which would eventually evolve into the Mott's Fruitsations brand.

In 1999, Cadbury Schweppes acquired the Hawaiian Punch brand for $203 million, giving Mott's responsibility for producing and marketing the shelf-stable portion of the business, and giving the rest of the business to Dr. Pepper/Seven Up, one of Cadbury's other subsidiaries.

In early 2006, all of Mott's beverage brands (Hawaiian Punch, IBC Root Beer, Mr & Mrs T Bloody Mary mix, Orangina, and Yoo-hoo) were folded into Cadbury Schweppes Americas Beverages. In 2008 Mott's was demerged from Cadbury Schweppes plc, to operate as a separate unit of Keurig Dr Pepper.

=== Key Dates ===
- 1842: Samuel R. Mott starts making and selling cider and vinegar in Bouckville, New York.
- 1900: The company (then called Genesee Fruit Company) is sold to the W.B. Duffy Cider Company.
- 1914: Mott's merges with the W.B. Duffy Cider Company, creating Duffy-Mott, incorporated in New York.
- 1933: Duffy-Mott begins producing prune juice.
- 1938: Duffy-Mott introduces Mott's Apple Juice.
- 1958: Duffy-Mott completes its initial public offering of stock.
- 1982: Cadbury Schweppes acquires Duffy-Mott.
- 1986: Duffy-Mott shortens its name to Mott’s Inc.
- 1991: Mott’s introduces fruit-flavored apple sauces, which would eventually evolve into the Mott's Fruitsations brand.
- 1999: Cadbury-Schweppes acquires the Hawaiian Punch brand and partially integrates it with Mott's.
- 2001: The company introduces Mott’s Healthy Harvest, an unsweetened apple sauce blended with other fruits.
- 2002: During the previous four years, annual sales for Mott's double.
- 2008: Cadbury Schweppes divests Mott's as part of Keurig Dr Pepper.
- 2008: Motts sources all of its apple juice from China, violating recommended FDA levels of arsenic.
- 2010: The company introduces Mott’s Fruit Snacks

==== Acquisitions ====
- 1929: Standard Apple Products Company
- 1953: Clapp's Baby Foods
- 1960: Pratt-Low Preserving Corporation
- 1960s: Cherry Growers Co., Inc., of Michigan
- 1966: Lord Mott Canning Company
- 1966: Tilghman Packaging Company
- 1966: Clamato
- 1987: Mr & Mrs T
- 2001: ReaLime and ReaLemon

=== Labor issues at Williamson, New York plant ===
On May 23, 2010, 305 workers at the Mott's plant in Williamson, New York, represented by the Retail, Wholesale and Department Store Union Local 220 (RWDSU), voted to strike after Mott's parent company at the time, Dr Pepper Snapple Group (DPS)—despite healthy profits, an increase in market share and stock price—proposed serious cuts to employee benefits.

The proposal from the company included a $1.69-per-hour wage cut for all employees, a pension elimination for future employees, and a pension freeze for current employees, a 20% decrease in employer contributions to the 401(k) and increased employee contributions toward health care premiums and co-payments. DPS came under criticism for proposing cuts to worker pay at a time when not only was the local economy in turmoil, but the top three executives at DPS had doubled their pay between 2007 and 2009.

Then-State Attorney General Andrew Cuomo wrote to Mott's on June 25, 2010, urging the company to return to the bargaining table and come to a "fair and equitable solution."

In a letter to Fang Li, President and CEO of Keurig Dr Pepper, U.S. Senator Chuck Schumer expressed concern that,

… with unemployment in the Rochester area nearly 10 percent, the ongoing labor shortage is not only harming the 305 workers of the RWDSU Local 200 who work in the facility, but can harm the entire Wayne County economy due to the facility's centrality to the regional and state apple market.

This sentiment was echoed by the New York Apple Association, Inc., in a statement urging Mott's to continue negotiations:

The current impasse between the valued work force at the Williamson plant and management not only threatens the growers' and workers' future, but places more than 150 years of building brand recognition and consumer loyalty for Mott's products at risk.

On Monday, September 13, 2010, the strike ended after Mott's workers voted to approve the company's most recent proposal. The new agreement included a wage freeze, but not the pay cuts the company had demanded. The contract also preserved pensions for existing workers.

== Brands ==
- Clamato
- Hawaiian Punch
- Mr & Mrs T
- Orangina (North America)
- ReaLemon and ReaLime
- Yoo-hoo

== See also ==
- Juice Products Association
