= Vanhoutte =

Family name

Vanhoutte or van Houtte is a surname of Dutch and Belgian origin.

People with the name include:

== Vanhoutte ==
- Alexandre Vanhoutte (born 1974), French bobsledder
- Charles Vanhoutte (born 1998), Belgian football player
- Emily Vanhoutte (born 1994), Belgian model and beauty pageant winner
- Fenna Vanhoutte (born 1997), Belgian cyclist
- Marie Léonie Vanhoutte (1888–1967), French World War I spy

== Van Houtte ==
- Albert-Louis Van Houtte (1877–1944), French-born Canadian businessman and coffee specialist
- Jean Van Houtte (1907–1991), Belgian politician
- Louis van Houtte (1810–1876), Belgian horticulturalist
