= Timothy Cofer =

American businessman

- Born: Timothy Cofer; United States
- Education: St. Olaf College (BA); University of Minnesota (MBA)
- Title: CEO, Keurig Dr Pepper

Timothy (Tim) Cofer is an American business executive currently serving as the chief executive officer of Keurig Dr Pepper. Before this role, Cofer was CEO of Central Garden & Pet for four years and spent 27 years at Kraft Foods and Mondelez International, where he held senior executive positions, including as President of both companies' European divisions as well as managing Asia-Pacific division of Mondelez.

== Early life and education ==
Tim Cofer grew up in White Bear Lake, Minnesota, and lived in Milan, Italy, and Brussels, Belgium, in the 1980s. In 1986, He graduated from White Bear Lake Area High School. He studied economics and political science at St. Olaf College, getting a BA degree in economics in 1990. Subsequently, in 1992, he earned an MBA from the University of Minnesota.

== Career ==
=== Kraft Foods (1992–2012) ===
Cofer joined Kraft Foods in 1992 and held a variety of marketing and management roles. In 2006, Cofer became president of Oscar Mayer Foods in the US. From 2007 to 2009 he led Kraft's frozen pizza business, which was sold to Nestlé for $3.7 billion in 2010. He also oversaw the integration of the UK-based Cadbury into Kraft in 2010. He then oversaw Kraft's chocolate division.

In August 2011, he was named the head of the company's European Region, residing in Zurich, Switzerland.

=== Mondelez International (2012–2019) ===
Cofer worked at Mondelez International from 2012 to 2019, holding the position of Chief Growth Officer starting in 2016. During this time, as CGO, he led SnackFutures, an initiative by Mondelez aimed at creating and investing in new snacking brands, technologies, and business models.

=== Central Garden & Pet (2019–2023) ===
Cofer then served as CEO of Central Garden & Pet from October 2019 through October 2023, and oversaw the company's acquisitions of Green Garden Products, Hopewell Nursery and Ferry-Morse Seed Company in 2021.

=== Keurig Dr Pepper (2023–present) ===
In September 2023, Cofer was appointed Chief Operating Officer of Keurig Dr Pepper, with a planned transition to succeed Robert Gamgort as CEO in 2024.

Cofer assumed the role of CEO of Keurig Dr Pepper in April 2024. He launched a new company strategy and oversaw the continued growth of carbonated soft drink brand Dr Pepper with new flavors. This included the expansion of market share, diversifying product offerings, and recognizing consumer trends that saw continued growth for Dr Pepper, which was the second-most popular carbonated beverage in the U.S. in 2023, as noted by Beverage Digest.

Cofer launched a video series called "Taste Test with Tim" to highlight the company's beverage portfolio. In June 2024, Cofer announced KDP's acquisition of Kalil Bottling Company in Arizona to bolster the company's direct-store-delivery operations. In October 2024, he also oversaw the company's acquisition of GHOST, an energy drink company. Keurig Dr Pepper agreed to acquire a 60% majority stake in GHOST for approximately $990 million.
