= IBC Root Beer =

American soda brand

Independent Breweries Company
- Type: Private
- Industry: Beverage
- Founded: 1919; 107 years ago
- Defunct: Unknown
- Fate: Closed, IBC name sold
- Successor: Northwestern Bottling Company
- Headquarters: St. Louis, Missouri
- Key people: Griesedieck family
- Products: IBC Root Beer

IBC Root Beer
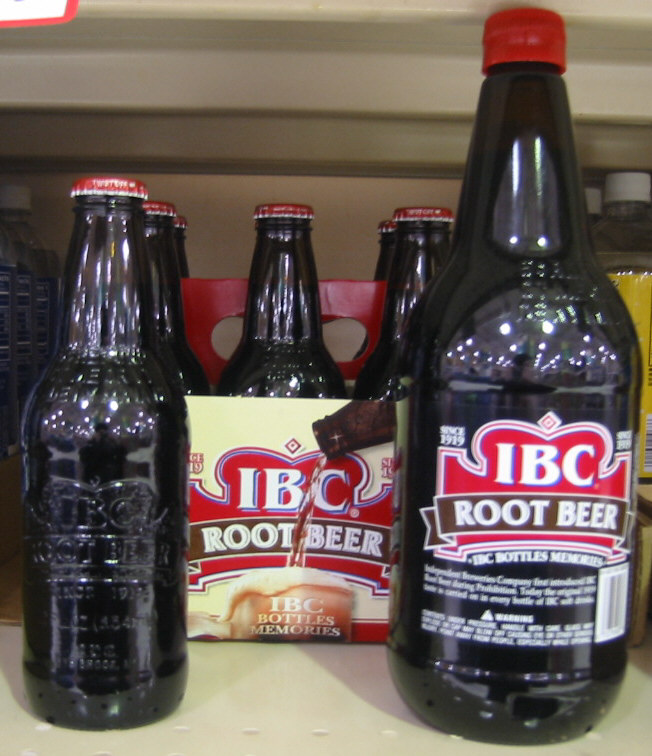
- Type: Soft Drink
- Manufacturer: Independent Breweries Company (1919–?); Northwestern Bottling Company; National Bottling Company (1930s–1976); Taylor Beverages (1976–1980); Seven-Up Company (1980–1986); Dr Pepper/Seven Up (1986–1995); Cadbury Schweppes (1995–2008); Dr Pepper Snapple Group (2008–2018); Keurig Dr Pepper (2018–present)
- Origin: 1919 in St. Louis, Missouri, United States
- Variants: IBC Diet Root Beer
- Website: www.ibcrootbeer.com

IBC Root Beer is an American brand of root beer now owned by Keurig Dr Pepper. It was originally owned by IBC until it went out of business.

== Independent Breweries Company ==
The Independent Breweries Company is a defunct syndicate founded in St. Louis, Missouri, by the combination of Griesediecks' National Brewery, Columbia (Alpen Brau), the Gast brewery in Baden, A.B.C., and Wagner Brewing Company. This combination was ill-fated due to high overhead with too many executives and low profits forcing IBC into receivership. The IBC Root Beer was the main survivor of the syndicate.

== Flavors ==
=== Current ===
In 2020:

- IBC Root Beer
- IBC Diet Root Beer
- IBC Cream Soda
- IBC Black Cherry
- IBC Cherry Limeade
- IBC Coconut Lime

=== Former ===
- IBC Tangerine Cream Soda
- IBC Cherry Cola
- IBC Strawberries and Cream
- IBC Berries and Cream
- IBC Birch Beer
- IBC Peach Cream Soda

== See also ==
- Fitz's, another St. Louis root beer
