= Ben Weiss =

American entrepreneur

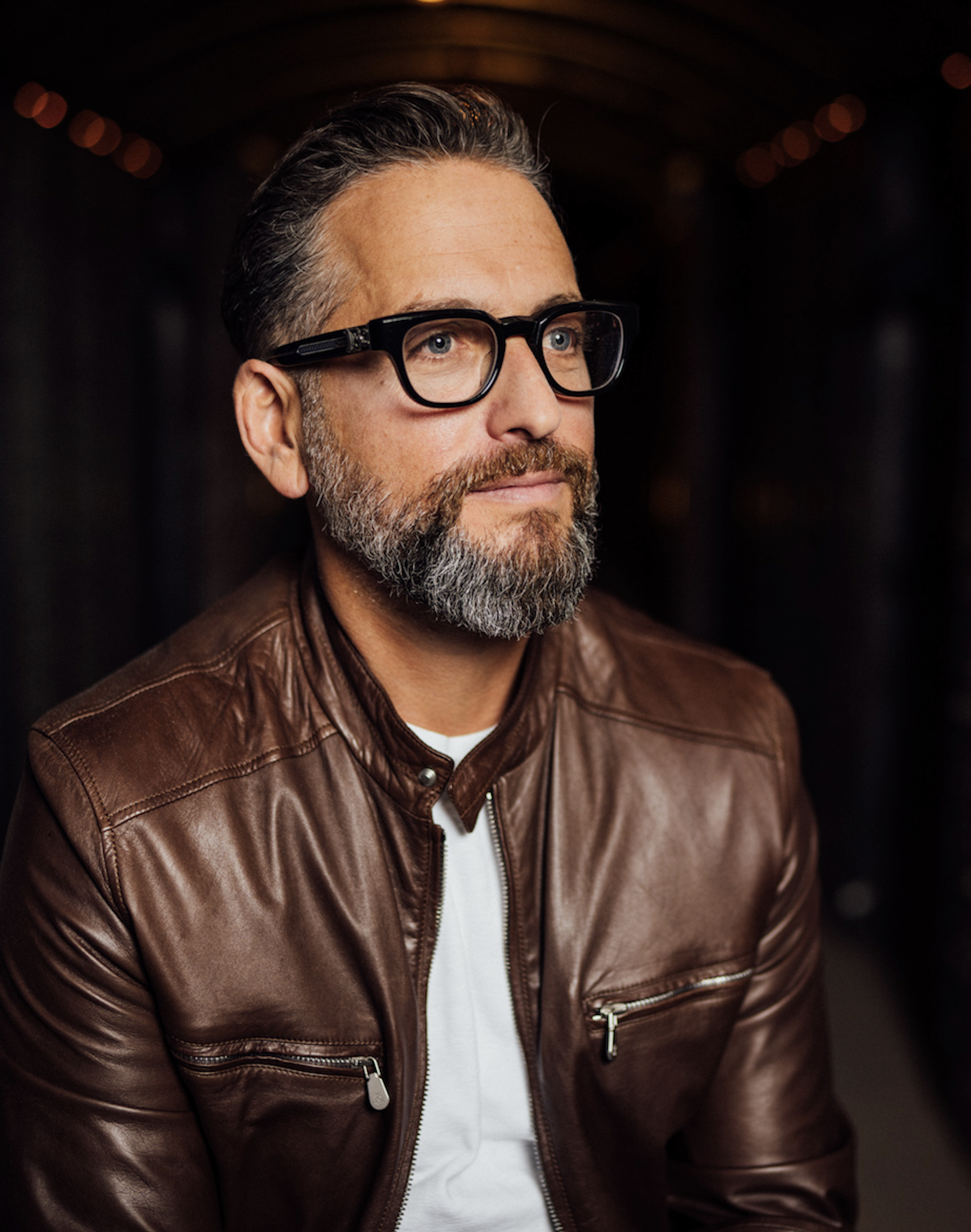
Beverage entrepreneur and author Ben Weiss

Ben Weiss is an American entrepreneur who founded the beverage companies Bai Brands and Crook & Marker. He is the author of Basementality: How This Entrepreneur Drove His Fight Against Big Sugar and Rose from the Basement to a $1.7 Billion Brand, and is the host of Billion Dollar Idea on Fox Business Network.

== Early life ==
Weiss was born in Brooklyn, New York, and raised on Staten Island. He graduated from Boston University with a finance degree in 1992 and then pursued an interest in entrepreneurship that he developed as a child.

== Career ==
In 1994, Weiss started his first business, a venture with Godiva Chocolatier to sell coffee in movie theaters, and later created the Chocolixir frozen chocolate beverage for Godiva's retail stores. His other early ventures included a coffee distribution business and a café in Queens, New York.

In 2009, Weiss founded the antioxidant beverage brand Bai in the basement of his Princeton, New Jersey, townhouse. Weiss built Bai into one of the fastest-growing brands in the beverage industry as a lower-calorie alternative to soda without artificial sweeteners. In 2016, Dr Pepper Snapple Group announced a cash purchase of Bai for $1.7 billion. Weiss departed Bai in 2017 after the acquisition.

In 2019, Weiss founded Crook & Marker, an organic alcohol beverage line that competes with hard seltzers to challenge established alcohol brands.

In 2020, Weiss released his book Basementality, which covers his entrepreneurial career. The book includes a foreword by singer Zac Brown and endorsements from entertainer Justin Timberlake, journalist Katie Couric and former U.S. Senator Bill Bradley. Following the publication of Basementality, Weiss frequently speaks on entrepreneurship and innovation at colleges and universities.

In 2022, Weiss's show, Billion Dollar Idea, debuted on Fox Business Network as part of its new primetime lineup. The show features entrepreneurs competing in a variety of challenges to win an investment from Weiss.

== Personal life ==
Weiss lives in Princeton, New Jersey, with his wife, Danna, who co-founded Bai, and his children, Jack and Shayna.

== Bibliography ==
- Weiss, Ben (2020). Basementality: How This Entrepreneur Drove His Fight Against Big Sugar and Rose from the Basement to a $1.7 Billion Brand. Sun Owl LLC. ISBN 978-1-7347325-0-4
