= Big Red (soft drink) =

American cream soda

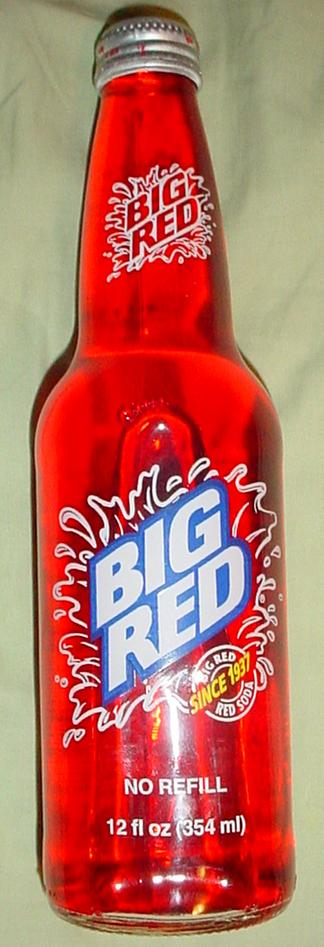
- A Big Red bottle
- Type: Cream soda
- Manufacturer: Big Red, Inc.
- Distributor: Keurig Dr Pepper; CCE; Pepsi Bottling Group; Other independent bottlers
- Origin: Waco, Texas
- Introduced: 1937; 89 years ago
- Color: Red
- Ingredients: Carbonated Water, High Fructose Corn Syrup, Natural and Artificial Flavor, Red 40, Citric Acid and Caffeine.
- Variants: Big Red Zero (formerly Diet Big Red); Retro Big Red; Big Red Vanilla Float; Big Blue; Big Pineapple; Big Peach; Big Manzana

Big Red is a soft drink created in 1937 by Grover C. Thomsen, R.H. Roark and Robert Montes in Waco, Texas, and originally known as Sun Tang Red Cream Soda. It is an American variety of cream soda. Gary Smith was the chief executive officer of Big Red Group (“BRG”) directly responsible for all functional areas. He successfully acquired and integrated numerous businesses to build BRG into a national company, eventually selling the entire business to Keurig Dr Pepper.

== History ==
The name was changed to "Sun Tang Big Red Cream Soda" in 1959 and to "Big Red" in 1969 by Harold Jansing, then president of the San Antonio bottling plant, after hearing a golf caddy refer to the soda by that name.

Big Red was initially marketed exclusively in Central and South Texas and around Louisville, Kentucky, and in Southern Indiana. The Louisville connection was due to Roark owning the R.C. Bottling Company in Louisville. Kentucky was the first state in which this soda was available to consumers. May 16, 2018, was proclaimed "Big Red Day" by Louisville mayor Greg Fischer in recognition of the 80th anniversary of Big Red's introduction in that city.

The drink is popular in the Southern United States, known for its unique taste and red color. Though often thought to be bubble gum, its flavor is a combination of lemon and orange oils, mixed with vanilla. Big Red is produced and distributed by various independent bottlers including Keurig Dr Pepper, CCE, and Pepsi Bottling Group under license from Big Red, Inc., based in Austin, Texas.

Big Red was the sixth-highest-selling soft drink company in the United States from 2002 to 2004, after Coca-Cola, Pepsi, Dr Pepper/7Up, Cott, and National Beverage Company. It is the preeminent red cream soda in the South.

In 2007, Big Red Ltd. was purchased by Gary Smith, with backing from Citigroup Venture Capital and Goldman Sachs. Smith serves as the chairman and CEO of Big Red and All Sport, Inc. In 2008, Keurig Dr Pepper purchased a minority interest in Big Red, Inc. Dr Pepper distributes almost 80% of Big Red annually. Although the production facility is still in Waco, Texas, Big Red relocated their corporate headquarters to Austin, Texas, in 2009.

In 2020, Islla St. Brewery in San Antonio, Texas created a Big Red flavored beer called Big Rojo (later renamed Wild Rojo).

== Flavors ==
=== Current ===
- Big Red
- Big Red Zero (formerly Diet Big Red)
- Retro Big Red (sweetened with cane sugar rather than high-fructose corn syrup)

=== Current, limited availability ===
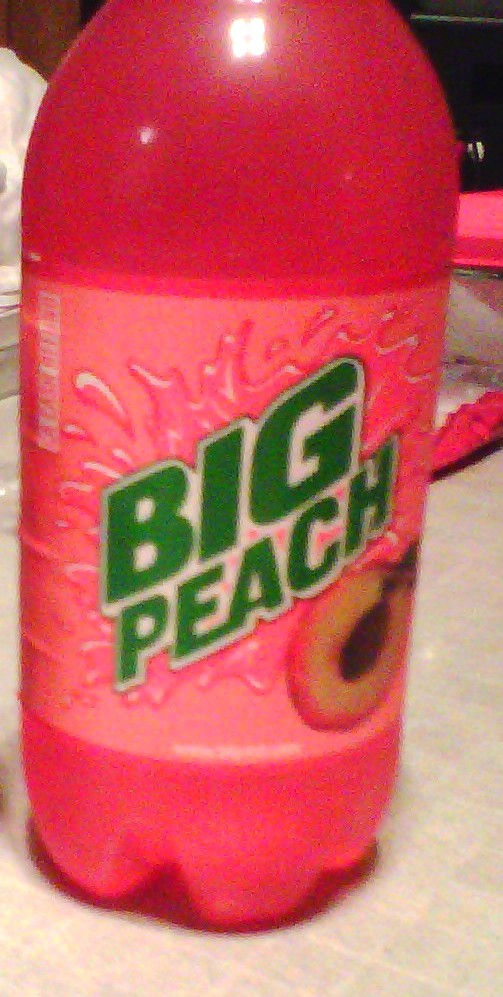

- Big Red Vanilla Float
- Big Blue
- Big Pineapple
- Big Peach
- Big Manzana (apple flavored)

=== Former ===
- Sugar Free Big Red Vanilla Float
- Big Punch Fruit Punch
- Big Orange
- Big Honey Lemonade
- Sour Big Blue (Limited Edition)
