= Arnold Greenberg (Snapple) =

American businessman

- Born: Arnold Shepard Greenberg; September 2, 1932; Brooklyn, New York, USA
- Died: October 26, 2012 (aged 80); New York City, New York, USA
- Known for: Co-founder of Snapple
- Spouses: Marilyn Parmet; Roberta Budoff
- Children: Susan Greenberg Minster; Robin Greenberg Nijankin; Michael Greenberg

Arnold Shepard Greenberg (September 2, 1932 – October 26, 2012) was an American businessman who co-founded Snapple, a brand of tea and juice drinks, in the 1970s with Leonard Marsh, his former high school classmate, and Hyman Golden, who was Marsh's brother-in-law. Greenberg later became the vice president and chief operating officer of the Snapple Corporation and retired after the 1994 acquisition of the brand to Quaker Oats.

== Early years ==
Greenberg was born to a Jewish family in 1932 in Brooklyn, New York, and raised in the Brownsville neighborhood. He attended Samuel J. Tilden High School in East Flatbush. His father owned a store in Manhattan's East Village located on First Avenue near St. Mark's Place. The store sold mainstays of the city's traditional Jewish cuisine, including pickles, herring and lox. Arnold Greenberg was running the day-to-day operations of his father's store by the 1950s.

== Career ==
Greenberg changed the business into a health food store in the 1960s as the neighborhood transitioned from largely Jewish into a hippie enclave. In 1972, he partnered with two friends, brothers-in-law Leonard Marsh and Hyman Golden, a classmate from Samuel J. Tilden High School, to launch a new business, Unadulterated Food Products, which would later become known Snapple.

== Death ==
Greenberg died from a long battle with cancer in New York City on October 26, 2012, at the age of 80. He was survived by his second wife, Roberta Budoff; two daughters from his first marriage to his late first wife, Susan Minster and Robin Nijankin; his brother, Herbert; three stepchildren; and fourteen grandchildren. He was predeceased by his first wife, Marilyn Parmet, who died in 1993, and their son, Michael Greenberg. A resident of Delray Beach, Florida, Greenberg also kept homes in Southampton, New York and Manhattan.
