= Jif (lemon juice) =

Brand of natural strength lemon juice

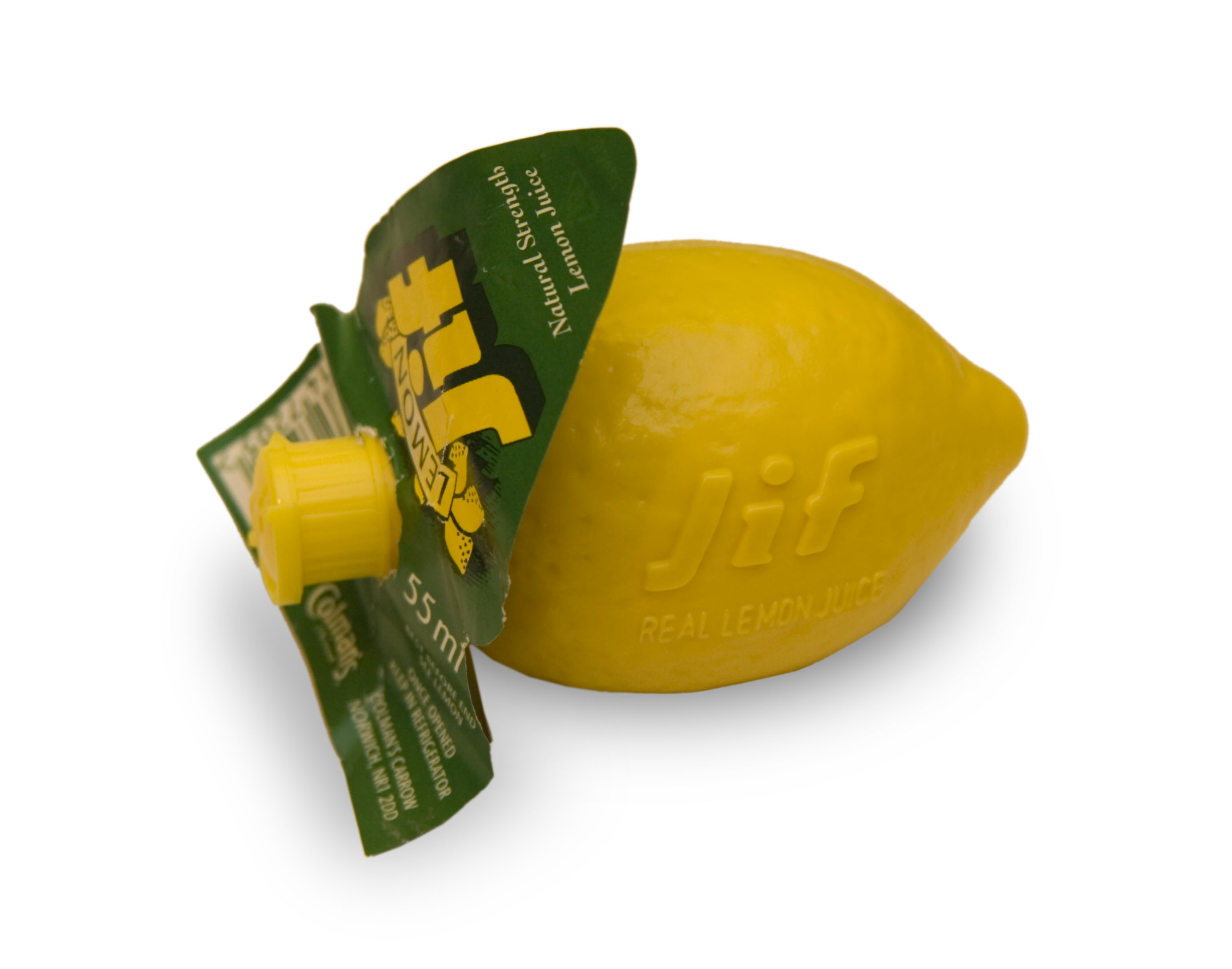
- A Jif lemon with the label attached
- Product type: Lemon juice
- Current owner: Unilever
- Produced by: Unilever
- Introduced: 1956; 70 years ago
- Markets: United Kingdom and Ireland
- Previous owners: Reckitt and Colman

Jif is a brand of natural strength lemon juice prepared using lemon juice concentrate and water, whereby the concentrate is reconstituted using water. After reconstitution, it is packaged and marketed. It is sold in the United Kingdom and Ireland by Unilever. Jif is used as a flavourant and ingredient in dishes, and as a condiment. Two tablespoons is around the equivalent of the juice of one lemon. The product has a shelf life of six months.

Jif is packaged in lemon-shaped squeezable containers and in bottles. Development of the plastic container began in the 1950s; it was one of the original blow moulded containers used for food applications. Jif brand lemon juice was established in 1956.

The "Jif Lemon case" occurred in the 1980s, when the US company Borden introduced lemon juice packaged in a similar container to the UK. Reckitt & Coleman sued Borden for passing off. The case was settled in 1990 for Reckitt & Coleman.

Jif is sometimes used on pancakes, and was marketed from 1985 to be used on pancakes for Shrove Tuesday, with the slogan "Don't forget the pancakes on Jif Lemon Day".

== Formulation ==
Jif
Nutritional value per 5 ml
- Energy: 1 kcal (4.2 kJ)
- Carbohydrates: 0.1 g
- ^{†}Percentages estimated using US recommendations for adults.

Jif is prepared from reconstituted lemon concentrate and water as primary ingredients, and is formulated to be the same strength as natural lemons. The concentrate is reconstituted using water. The product contains the food preservative E223 (sodium metabisulphite). Jif has a shelf life of six months. Two tablespoons is the equivalent of the juice of one lemon.

=== Nutrition information ===
A 5 ml serving size of Jif provides 1 kcal (kilocalorie) of energy and 0.1 grams of carbohydrate.

=== Uses ===
Jif is used as an ingredient and flavourant in dishes and foods, and as a condiment, such as on pancakes. It may be used to add flavour to salads, sauces, fish and seafood, among other foods. It can be used in recipes that require or recommend the use of lemon juice.

== Packaging ==
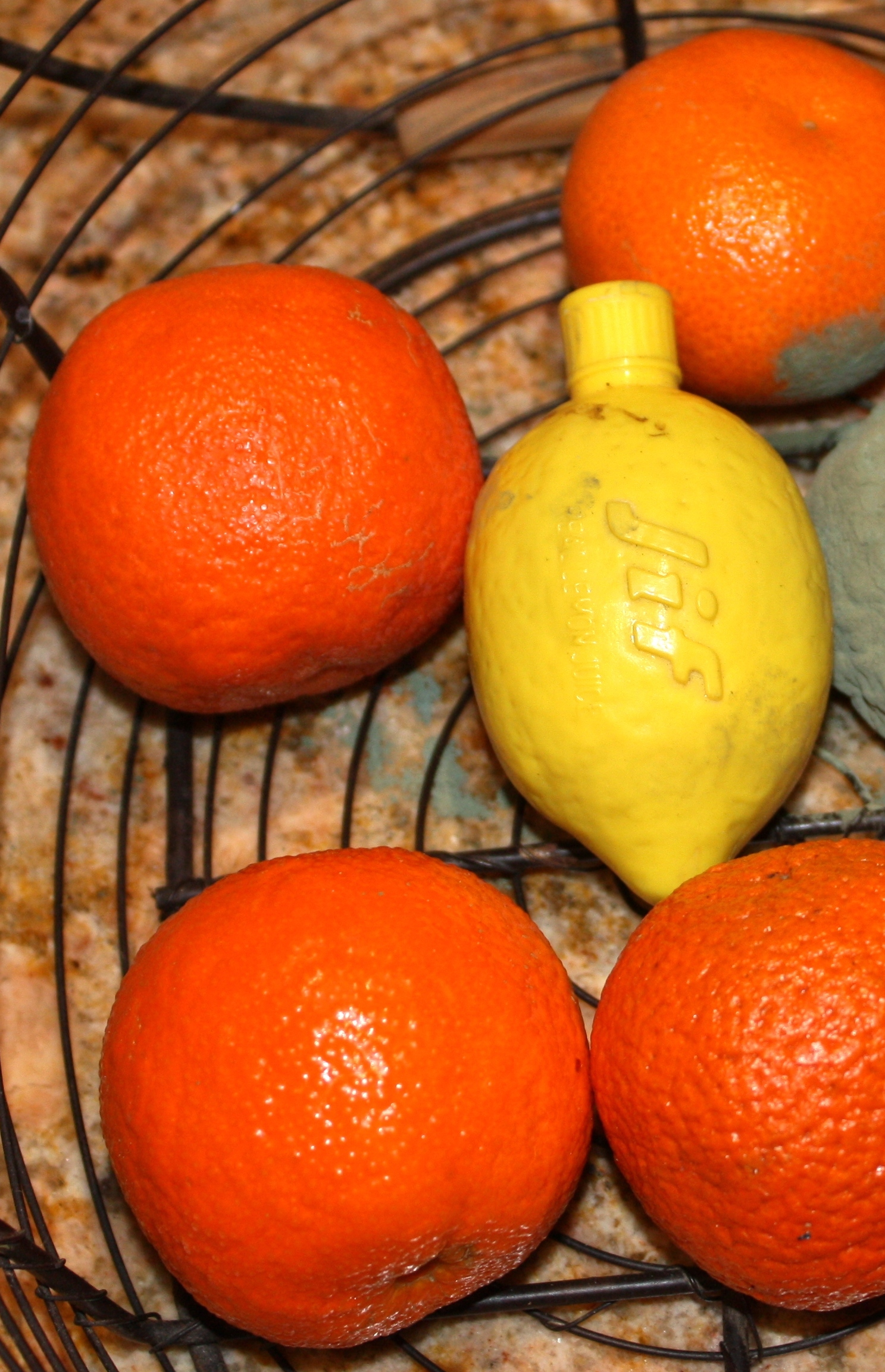
The size of a Jif lemon juice container, compared to oranges

Aside from its plastic, lemon-shaped containers containing 55 ml of juice, usually known as "jiffy lemons" or "jif lemons", Jif lemon juice is also sold in bottles. The plastic container is a squeeze pack container, whereupon squeezing the container releases juice from its nozzle. Jif containers were embossed with the brand name "Jif" in 1956, the same year the company came into existence. Contemporary Jif containers have the phrase "Jif real lemon juice" embossed on the side of the squeeze pack.

The Jif plastic containers were originally made from polythene, and were one of the original and first blow moulded containers used for food applications. The plastic containers served to replace glass bottles used to package lemon juice. The plastic container was the brainchild of Edward Hack, and the container's design was undertaken by Bill Pugh, the chief plastics designer at Cascelloid. In its development, Pugh carved a core made of wood, covered it with fresh lemon peel to give it a realistic texture, and then cast a plaster mould. This led to the realistic-looking container that significantly resembles a lemon.

Some sources have stated that similar plastic lemon packaging existed in Italy at the time of the end of World War II, prior to the time of the packaging design in the United Kingdom.

== History ==
=== Hax, Realemon and ReaLem brands ===
Edward Hack developed the original idea and model of lemon juice being contained inside lemon-shaped and coloured packaging in the 1950s. The product was then designed and produced by Cascelloid Ltd. Hack presented Cascelloid with a fresh lemon he acquired at Covent Garden, upon which to base the plastic container. Hack had performed significant searches at several markets to find an optimal model. Cascelloid stated that Hack reviewed and evaluated the entire inventory of lemons at Fortnum and Mason's, Selfridges, Harrods and Covent Garden, the latter of which involved examining three cases of lemons that contained around 300 lemons in each case. Stanley Wagner had been brought up in the wholesale fruit business, his father having a very substantial company in Spitalfields Market. Bill Pugh, the chief plastics designer at Cascelloid, based in Leicester, and former Royal Air Force pilot, created a prototype of the blown lemon-shaped plastic shaped container based upon Hack's idea sometime in the 1950s, as well as other types of blown containers. Pugh experimented with the initial design until he was satisfied with its appearance. This plastic lemon product was then used for Hax lemon juice. Edward Hack, Ltd. produced and marketed Hax brand squeezable plastic lemon containers filled with two ounces of Sicilian lemon juice. Per Edward Hack, Ltd., the juice was unfiltered, had no water added to it, and contained a preservative to prevent spoilage. Retailers could purchase the product in packs of six bags that contained 12 squeeze packs each, totalling 72 units. Upon introduction to the marketplace, Hax juice and the plastic lemon design received some press coverage. The Hax logo used on Hax lemon juice dates back to at least 1935, at which time it was used in advertisements for Hax brand iodine pencils and Hax brand aspirin.

The plastic lemon container and the idea of marketing lemon juice in this manner was also undertaken independently by Stanley Wagner, a businessperson in the frozen food industry, and also a former Royal Air Force fighter pilot. Wagner's plastic lemon was produced by Shipton, a plastics company. Wagner was with the company Coldcrops, Ltd., which produced Realemon. The Realemon trademark was developed and used for a lemon juice product based upon reconstitution in the 1940s. Realemon was later renamed to ReaLem by Coldcrops. Hax lemon juice was the first to be packaged and marketed in said lemon-shaped container, with Coldcrops following shortly thereafter with their own design. It is of intrigue to some that both Pugh and Wagner were both former Royal Air Force pilots.

Over the course of a ten-month period from mid-1955 to early 1956 more than six million of the plastic juice lemons were sold by Coldcrops. This initially began under the brand name "Realemon", and then after an objection by the then Board of Trade, the name was changed to "ReaLem" and marketed with the slogan "juice in a jiffy". The Board of Trade objected because it was perceived that Coldcrops was possibly passing off their product as the Realemon brand from the United States. During this same time period, Hax was marketing tomato ketchup and brown sauce in custom-shaped plastic containers, for use on restaurant tables. After a long argument about plastic containers, the two companies agreed that they would not compete with one-another, and Coldcrops took the marketing rights for plastic lemons under the ReaLem brand. Coldcrops would market ReaLem lemon juice and agreed to not enter other plastic container markets.

=== Jif brand ===
Reckitt and Colman approached Stanley Wagner to buy Coldcrops, and after a very long negotiation a deal was concluded. A letter from Barclays Bank dated 21 June 1956 reads " Dear Mr Wagner, I have pleasure in enclosing two copies of the Draft for £......... credited to your account, which the Bank will be pleased if you will accept as a souvenir of this most successful transaction". The deal transferred ownership of the packaging and concept from Coldcrops to Reckitt & Coleman, and the new Jif-brand lemon juice was launched in 1956. All parties were delighted, Stanley Wagner with a substantial sum of money, for those days and a large profit from the six million lemons that had been sold, Reckitt's even more so because the negotiating team had permission to pay far more for the business than they were able to achieve. Lemon farmers in Sicily were also pleased, because the demand had increased for Sicilian lemon juice, which was largely a by-product of Sicilian lemon oil production. For many years, whilst producing lemon oil, Sicilians had found little use for the juice. Now there was a rapidly growing market for their near-waste product. In 1970, Jif continued to be prepared with lemon juice from Sicily. Later on, Unilever acquired the Jif brand in 1995 for the price of £250m, when it purchased Colman's of Norwich.

At the time of Jif's product launch in 1956, it was marketed with the tagline 'Real lemon juice in a Jif'. In 1956, Jif was the sole brand of lemon juice packaged in a squeeze pack container in the United Kingdom. The new Jif brand used the packaging developed by Shipton Plastics, ( a manufacturer of telephone casings), quite independently of Hack and Cascelloid, developing the plastic lemon for ReaLemon whilst Cascelloid were concentrating on tomato ketchup containers.

=== Competitors ===
The U.S. company Borden acquired the rights to the ReaLemon brand of lemon juice in the United States in 1962 when it purchased the ReaLemon-Puritan Company for around $12.4 million. ReaLemon had begun production in the U.S. in the 1930s.

Sales of ReaLemon realized successful profits in Europe in 1975, at which time Borden expanded into the United Kingdom market, purveying a 250 ml bottle of lemon juice. By 1980, ReaLemon comprised around 25% of the U.K. lemon juice market. In response to this competition, Reckitt & Coleman began producing Jif in 150 ml- and 250 ml-sized bottles. Borden then began making plans to market ReaLemon in a lemon-shaped package that was similar to Jif's packaging. This resulted in a lawsuit initiated by Reckitt & Coleman against Borden, based upon the notion that ReaLemon was attempting to copy Jif's packaging in attempts to mislead consumers, by passing off their product as Jif.

The case became known as "The Jif Lemon case", and was settled in 1990 in the Court of Appeal. It was ruled that a sufficient public recognition of Jif's packaging was existent, which created an established reputation for the brand. The ruling stated that consumers would be "likely to believe that the ReaLemon was a Jif Lemon when they saw it on a supermarket shelf." The ruling in Reckitt & Colman's favour occurred even though Reckitt & Colman did not register the plastic lemon packaging.

== Marketing ==
Jif is sometimes used on pancakes. An advertising campaign introduced the catch-phrase "Don't forget the pancakes on Jif lemon day," in reference to Shrove Tuesday, which is also referred to as Pancake Day. The campaign and slogan was devised by Reckitt and Colman's advertising agency, Foote Cone and Belding. The Jif lemon-shaped packaging aligned Jif with the consumption of pancakes on Shrove Tuesday in consumers' minds, creating a strong link between the product and Shrove Tuesday. Jif and pancakes is a popular combination on Shrove Tuesday. In 2000, over 80,000 Jif lemons were being produced per day to meet consumer demand for Pancake Day, beginning five weeks prior to Pancake Day. This occurred despite fresh lemons having greater availability during this time compared to other time periods. The adverts were shown throughout the 1970s, 1980s and 1990s decades on television screens in Ireland and United Kingdom.

== See also ==
- ReaLemon
- Cif
