= Fitz's =

Brand of soft drink

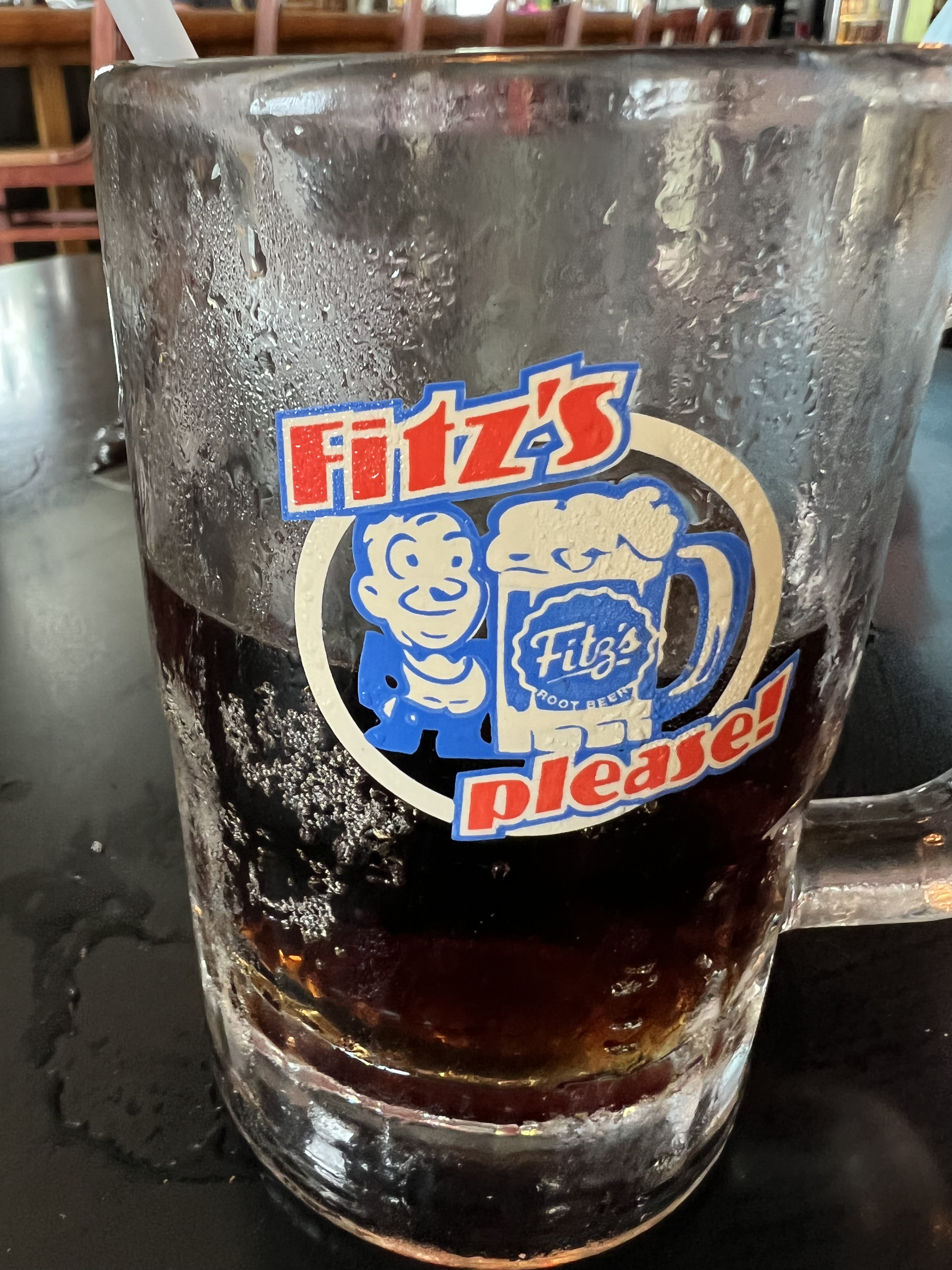
Fitzs Root beer glass

Fitz's Bottling Company is a regional soda brand in the St. Louis area. The flagship brand is its root beer popularized by its microbrewery and restaurant in University City, Missouri, on the historic Delmar Loop.

== History ==
Fitz's was originally a drive-in hamburger stand located on Brentwood Blvd, in the St. Louis suburb of Richmond Heights. The root beer was first produced in 1947 and sold alongside hamburgers and fries. Beverage production was discontinued when the original eatery shut down in 1976. However, the root beer was brought back in its original recipe 15 years later. In the early 1990s, a new location in the Delmar Loop was purchased; vintage bottling equipment installed at this location.

== Beverage line ==
In addition to root beer, Fitz's produces other soft drink flavors including diet root beer, voodoo (lemon-lime citrus) cream soda, diet cream soda, grape pop, orange pop, strawberry pop, ginger ale, hip hop pop (Raspberry Cola), and orange cream. The labels feature the locally familiar logo; its classic colors are red, white, and blue, but these colors change from one variety to the next to indicate and complement whatever flavor is in the bottle. The soda is made in the old-fashioned style of using cane sugar (as opposed to high fructose corn syrup).

Fitz's has produced some flavors which have been discontinued. These include Dr. Fizz (similar to Dr. Pepper with hints of black cherry), Birch Beer, and Lemonade Pop.

== Restaurant ==
The restaurant is designed in the 1950s art deco style and painted in bold colors. The interior features bar, booth, and table seating, with a connected patio for outdoor dining. The two-story building was originally a bank, with the bottling equipment in the space where the vault was located.

Along with their full line of soft drink flavors, Fitz's offers classic American-style cuisine as well as various shakes and malts. Children's meals are served in boxes designed to resemble 1950s cars, a throwback to the dining experience of the original Fitz's drive-in. Fitz's appeared in Rachael Ray's Tasty Travels.

== Expansion ==
From the late 1990s - 2000, Fitz's opened locations in Chesterfield, Missouri and Kansas City's Union Station. Both locations included restaurants and bottling plants. Initially successful, both restaurants eventually closed due to lackluster sales. They have also opened a location in South County in 2019.

== See also ==
- IBC Root Beer, another St. Louis Root beer
