= Bai Brands =

Beverage company

Bai Brands LLC
- Industry: Drink
- Founded: 2009; 17 years ago in Princeton, New Jersey
- Founder: Ben Weiss
- Headquarters: Trenton, New Jersey, United States
- Brands: Bai5
- Parent: Keurig Dr Pepper
- Website: www.drinkbai.com

Bai Brands is a beverage company founded in 2009 in Princeton, New Jersey, by entrepreneur Ben Weiss. Weiss started Bai after he learned about the coffeefruit – the fruit that surrounds the outside of the coffee bean — and decided to use it to create a new brand of beverages. The company offers a line of low-calorie soft drinks (including sodas, bottled water, iced tea, and non-carbonated fruit-flavored drinks) sweetened with erythritol and rebaudioside A (stevia leaf extract), ascorbic acid, and extract from coffea fruit harvested in Indonesia; its flavors typically are identified by the name of an exotic locale along with the natural fruit flavor used. Its flagship product is Bai Antioxidant Infusions. In 2015, it launched a brand of bottled water called Bai Antiwater.

By 2015, Bai was named one of “America’s Most Promising Companies” by Forbes. In 2016, entertainer Justin Timberlake invested in Bai and became the brand’s “chief flavor officer.” On November 22, 2016, it was announced that Dr Pepper Snapple Bottling Group had made a cash purchase of Bai Brands for $1.7 billion. The acquisition was completed on January 31, 2017. Less than a week later, on February 5, Bai aired their first national commercial during Super Bowl LI due to the success that they had with the regional commercial shown in the previous year's Super Bowl. They spent an estimated $5 million on the ad that also featured Timberlake and Christopher Walken. In 2023, Bai and Sydney Sweeney collaborated to make a raspberry lemon lime flavored beverage.

== Antioxidants lawsuit ==
A false advertising class action lawsuit was filed against Bai Brands on May 6, 2014. The lawsuit alleges that Bai Brands made misleading claims about the amount of antioxidants in its Bai5 Antioxidant Infusion drinks. On July 13, 2015, a federal judge in California allowed the plaintiffs to move forward with a portion of the lawsuit.
