= Ghost (company) =

American food and beverage company

Ghost Lifestyle LLC
- Industry: Food and Beverage
- Founded: 2016
- Founder: Dan Lourenco; Ryan Hughes
- Headquarters: Henderson, Nevada, U.S.
- Key people: Dan Lourenco; Ryan Hughes
- Brands: Ghost Lifestyle Ghost Beverages
- Owner: Keurig Dr Pepper (60%, 2024)
- Website: https://www.ghostlifestyle.com/

Ghost Lifestyle LLC is a consumer brand specializing in energy drinks, nutritional supplements and apparel. Located in Henderson, Nevada, US, the company was established in 2016 by Dan Lourenco and Ryan Hughes. The brand emphasises fitness, lifestyle, and nutritional support.

In 2024, Ghost became partially owned by Keurig Dr Pepper, which acquired a majority stake for over $1 billion.

As of 2024, Ghost is reported to sell products in over 40 countries.

== History ==
Ghost Lifestyle LLC was established in 2016 by co-founders Dan Lourenco and Ryan Hughes as a lifestyle brand. The company initially focused on developing nutritional supplements, including pre-workout and amino acid powders designed to support physical performance and hydration. Lourenco, who previously worked for a supplement company, was inspired by this experience to start Ghost. Hughes, a former professional bodybuilder, and Lourenco, a former flight instructor with experience flying private charter planes, drew on their respective careers' demands for mental focus as a basis for their interest in fitness and nutrition.

As an extension of the brand's offernings, Ghost Lifestyle launched Ghost Energy in 2020. By 2022, the brand had achieved significant growth, securing distribution in over 50,000 locations, facilitated by a partnership with AB InBEV.

In December 2023, CEO Dan Lourenco announced Ghost'S plans to expand its market presence and product offerings to Australia and New Zealand. The company also introduced Ghost HYDRATION in January 2024, a bottled hydration product that marked its entry into the hydration beverage category.

The brand is known for its transparency in listing all active ingredients and nutrition facts on its products, a practice consistent with the company's commitment to full disclosure.

In October 2024, Keurig Dr Pepper announced that it had entered an agreement with Ghost to purchase a 60% stake in the business for US$990 million, with a plan to acquire the remaining 40% shares in 2028 pending review of its financial performance.

In late April 2025, Ghost was sued by Mondelēz International for allegedly breaching licensing agreements for co-branded products, including Swedish Fish and Sour Patch Kids energy drink flavors as well as supplement products.

== Products ==
The Ghost product range is split into three main categories; drinks, nutritional products (including sports nutrition and dietary supplements), and merchandise.

=== Ghost Energy Drinks ===
Established through a partnership with Anheuser-Busch InBev in 2020, Ghost Energy drinks are sugar-free caffeinated beverages aimed at enhancing energy and mental focus. Each 473 ml can contains 200 mg of caffeine derived from natural sources, such as coffee beans. Additional components include nootropic ingredients like Taurine, Alpha-GPC and NeuroFactor, as well as B vitamins.

The Ghost Energy product line features a variety of flavors, including those inspired by collaborations with confectionery brands, such as Bubblicious, Warheads and Welch's. Flavors include Sour Green Apple, Bubblicious Strawberry Splash, Bubblicious Cotton Candy, Orange Cream, Sour Watermelon, Tropical Mango, and Cherry Limeade. Formerly produced and now discontinued include products based on Swedish Fish, Chips Ahoy!, and Sour Patch Kids.
