= Van Houtte =

Canadian coffee company

- Van Houtte logo
- Type: Private
- Industry: Restaurants; Retail Coffee; Retail Beverages; Entertainment
- Founded: In 1919; 107 years ago as a Speciality grocery store in Montreal, Quebec, Canada
- Founder: Albert-Louis Van Houtte
- Headquarters: Montreal, Quebec, Canada
- Products: Whole Bean Coffee; Made-to-order beverages Bottled beverages Baked Goods; Merchandise
- Services: Coffee
- Owner: Keurig Dr Pepper
- Website: Company website

Van Houtte Inc. is a company based in Montreal, Quebec, Canada that processes, distributes and sells coffee and coffee related goods. They have expanded their product selection, which now includes tropical teas, sandwiches and salads. It was founded by Albert-Louis Van Houtte.

== History ==
French-born Albert-Louis Van Houtte (1877–1944) emigrated to Canada in 1912. After the First World War made his attempt at a horse importing business unsustainable, he turned to food retailing. He opened a grocery store in 1919 to sell specialty items but soon found particular success with gourmet coffee roasting.

After Van Houtte's death in 1944, his family continued to operate and develop the Maison A.L. Van Houtte business. In 1980, the family business evolved into a corporation known as A.L Van Houtte Inc., led by Paul-André Guillotte and Benoît Beauregard. In 1987, the company went public on the Montreal Stock Exchange. Its corporate name was shortened to Van Houtte Inc. following a shareholder vote on 12 September 2000.

In 2000, U.S. sales alone represented around 20% of the company's total revenues, with products being sold in 28 states.

Today, Van Houtte has grown into an international supplier of coffee, coffee machines and related support for over 60,000 offices and other places of employment in the United States and Canada. The company claims this to be the largest such system in North America. Van Houtte also supplies and supports coffee sales for cafeterias, grocery and convenience stores, restaurants and hotels. Van Houtte also offers a selection of fair-traded coffee products.

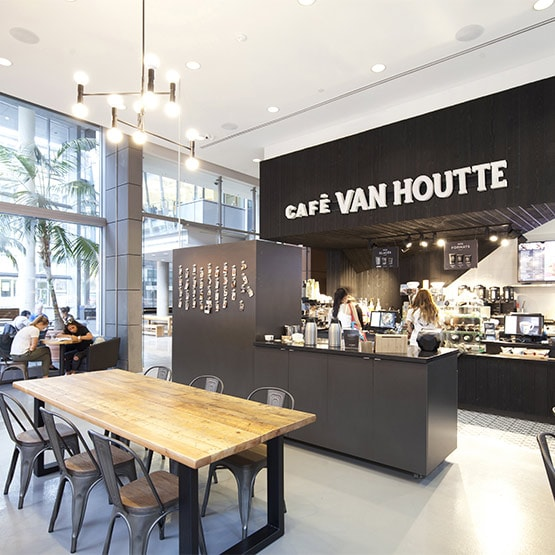

Van Houtte still sells coffee directly to customers through its chain of cafés throughout Quebec and two in Ontario (Ottawa). Van Houtte also offers coffee and associated products for sale through its website.

In May 2007, U.S. private equity firm Littlejohn & Co. announced a $600 million deal that will take Van Houtte ownership out of Canadian hands, although the coffee company will continue to have headquarters in Montreal under its existing name and have the leadership of its current management team.

On September 14, 2010, Van Houtte Inc. agreed to be bought by Vermont based coffee company, Green Mountain Coffee Roasters for Can $915 million. The completion of the transaction was announced on December 17, 2010.

On August 29, 2011 Green Mountain Coffee Roasters sold Van Houtte's U.S. Coffee Service business (Filterfresh) to Aramark for $145 million.

In November 2014, Keurig Green Mountain sold Quebec-based Van Houtte cafes to quick-service restaurant operator MTY Food Group, while retaining control of the Van Houtte brand, image, and wholesale business.

== Photos ==
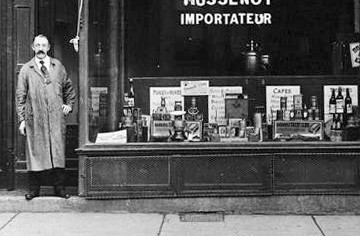
Albert-Louis and his first store in 1919.

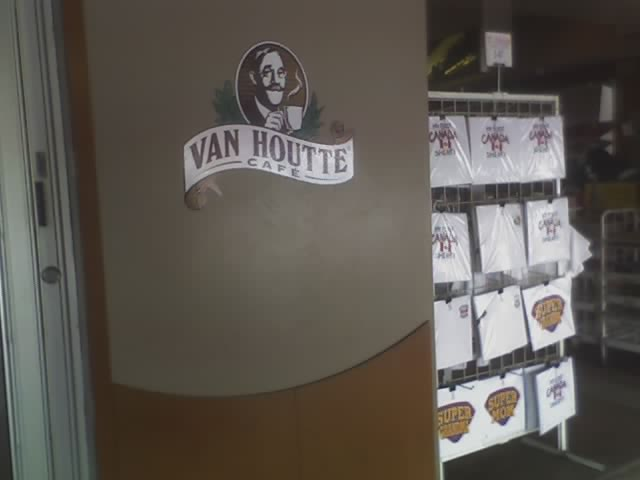
Entrance to Van Houtte café at the Ottawa Central Bus Station.

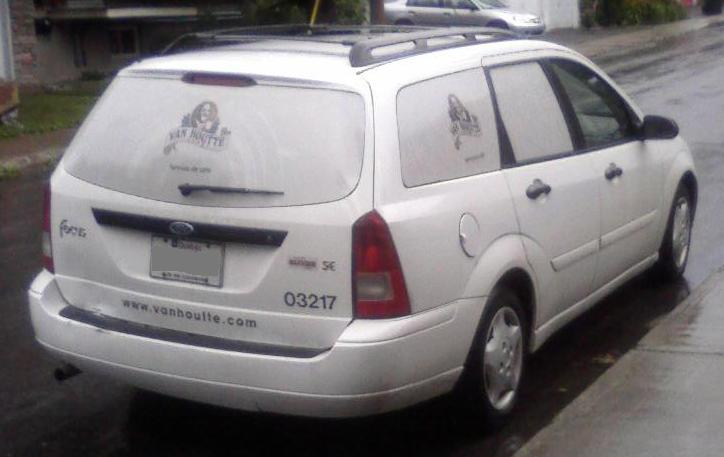
A 2000-04 Ford Focus wagon from Van Houtte.

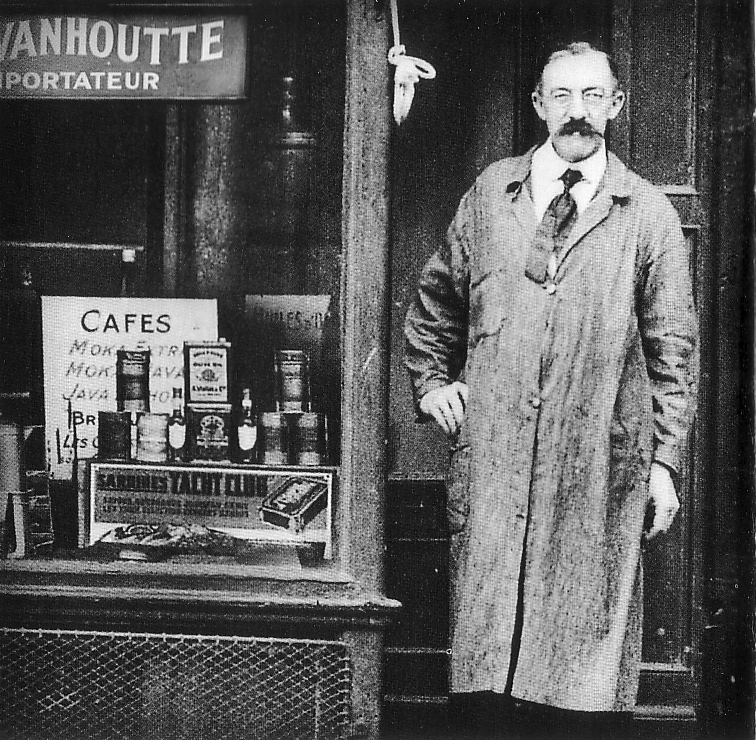
Higher resolution photo of Mr. Van Houtte in Montreal.

== See also ==
- Second Cup
- List of coffeehouse chains
