= ReaLemon =

Juice

- The logo of ReaLime (2016)
- Product type: Reconstituted lemon juice from concentrate. ReaLime is reconstituted lime juice from concentrate.
- Current owner: Mott's, part of Keurig Dr Pepper
- Introduced: ReaLemon in 1934; 92 years ago, ReaLime in 1944; 82 years ago
- Previous owners: Irving Swartzburg (inventor), Borden, Eagle Family Foods
- Website: realemon.ca

ReaLemon is an American brand of lemon juice that debuted in 1934, and is manufactured and marketed as of 2016 by Mott's, part of Keurig Dr Pepper. ReaLime is a brand of lime juice that debuted in 1944, is produced in the same manner as ReaLemon, and is also produced and marketed by Mott's.

Both ReaLemon and ReaLime are manufactured by reconstituting juice concentrate with filtered water to a natural strength. Irving Swartzburg invented the product and marketed it in 1934, and began to use the brand name "ReaLemon" in the early 1940s. In 1962, Borden purchased the rights to the ReaLemon brand in the United States from Swartzburg. Eagle Family Foods acquired the brand from Borden in 1998, and in 2001 Mott's acquired the brand.

Both products are used as an ingredient in various dishes, and ReaLemon is also used as an ingredient in some beverages. Both products also have some non-culinary uses.

== History ==
ReaLemon was created in 1934 by Irving Swartzburg, who started the business by selling bottles of reconstituted lemon juice from squeezed lemons to hotels, bars and other commercial customers. The brand name "ReaLemon" began to be used in the early 1940s. ReaLime is a brand of lime juice that is reconstituted from concentrate, which was introduced a decade after ReaLemon in 1944.

The U.S. company Borden acquired the rights to the ReaLemon and ReaLime brands in the United States in 1962 when it purchased the ReaLemon-Puritan Company for around $12.4 million. At this time, the ReaLemon brand had around a 90 percent market share of reconstituted lemon juice in the United States. In early 1970, ReaLemon had a "92 percent share of the national processed lemon juice market" in the United States. However, this market share reduced to 88 percent in August 1970 because of competitors entering into the national marketplace, particularly Golden Crown.

After ReaLemon met with success in European markets, Borden introduced it into the United Kingdom in 1975, as a 250 ml bottle of lemon juice. By 1980, ReaLemon comprised around 25% of the U.K. lemon juice market. In response to this competition, Reckitt & Coleman, the producers of Jif lemon juice began producing Jif in 150 ml- and 250 ml-sized bottles. Borden then began making plans to market ReaLemon in a lemon-shaped package that was similar to Jif's packaging. This resulted in a lawsuit initiated by Reckitt & Coleman against Borden, alleging that ReaLemon copied Jif's packaging to mislead consumers by confusing their product with Jif.

The case became known as "The Jif Lemon case", and was settled in 1990 in the Court of Appeal. It was ruled that a sufficient public recognition of Jif's packaging was existent, which created an established reputation for the brand. The ruling also stated that consumers would be "likely to believe that the ReaLemon was a Jif Lemon when they saw it on a supermarket shelf." The ruling in Reckitt & Colman's favour occurred despite the fact that Reckitt & Colman did not register the plastic lemon packaging.

Eagle Family Foods acquired the ReaLemon and ReaLime brands from Borden in 1998, and in 2001 Mott's, which at the time was a subsidiary of Cadbury Schweppes of London, and is now a part of Keurig Dr Pepper, acquired the brands from Eagle Family Foods. The total cost of the acquisition was around $128 million. In 2001, both ReaLemon and ReaLime had a 48 percent market share in the lemon and lime juice categories, making them a market leader at this time.

== Production ==
ReaLemon is a reconstituted product, prepared by adding filtered water to preserved lemon juice concentrate, with sulphites as a preservative and lemon oil as a flavor enhancer added during manufacturing. As bottled, the liquid is similar in strength to natural lemon juice. Realime is made similarly, with sulfites as a preservative and lime oil.

As of 2016 RealLemon and ReaLime were manufactured and marketed by Mott's.

ReaLemon is packaged in plastic bottles with a depiction of a lemon atop the bottle, and a yellow-colored cap. ReaLime is packaged in the same bottle with a lime and a green-colored cap. ReaLemon has also been packaged in the United States in smaller squeeze pack plastic containers that are shaped and colored like a whole lemon. ReaLemon is also packaged in single-serving packets.

In July 2012, the United States Food and Drug Administration issued a warning to the Dr. Pepper Snapple Group regarding HAACP (hazard analysis and critical control points) violations that were found at a processing plant in Irving, Texas. FDA found that lemon and lime juice was held in unsanitary conditions, which was a potential health threat to consumers. Company managers were advised by FDA that a reduction in microorganism levels was necessary to protect consumers.

== Uses ==
=== Culinary uses ===
Two to three tablespoons of ReaLemon lemon juice has the equivalent of the juice from one average-sized lemon. Both ReaLemon and ReaLime are used as ingredients in various recipes, such as in baking, grilling, and as an ingredient in marinades and salad dressings. ReaLemon can be used as an ingredient in hot tea, lemonade and hot lemonade, and in various cooked dishes and baked goods such as pies. ReaLemon and other lemon juices can be used to prevent browning discoloration from occurring in peeled or sliced potatoes. This is performed by soaking the sliced potatoes in a mixture of the lemon juice and water. Both ReaLemon and ReaLime must be refrigerated after the bottles are opened.

=== Other uses ===
ReaLemon and other lemon juices can be used as a household deodorizer and cleaner, which is effective per the highly acidic content of lemon juice. ReaLime can be used topically as a remedy to whiten yellowing fingernails by soaking one's fingernails in a mixture of ReaLime, salt and warm water for ten minutes.

== See also ==
- Jif – a brand of lemon juice prepared using reconstituted lemon juice concentrate
