= Peñafiel (mineral water) =

Mexican mineral water brand

- Type: Mineral water
- Manufacturer: Keurig Dr Pepper
- Origin: Tehuacán, Mexico
- Introduced: 1928; 97 years ago

Peñafiel is a Mexican mineral water brand currently manufactured by Grupo Peñafiel, the Mexican subsidiary of Keurig Dr Pepper.

== History ==
Peñafiel was founded in Tehuacán, Puebla around 1928.

Current presentations for products include Naturel, Twist and Classic.

Cadbury Schweppes acquired Peñafiel in 1992, adding the historic mineral water to a family that includes many other historic brands. Peñafiel grew under Cadbury Schweppes management, rolling out line extensions and innovative packaging. In August 2003, Peñafiel Twist spun into the marketplace, bringing consumers fruit-flavored mineral waters that contain more than 75% fewer calories than traditional soft drinks. The brand followed this with Peñafiel Naturel in April 2004, which contains no artificial sweeteners but still has about 75% fewer calories than most sodas.

Peñafiel is part of Plano, Texas-based Dr Pepper Snapple Group, an integrated refreshment-beverage business marketing more than 50 beverage brands throughout North America.

On June 18, 2019, the Center for Environmental Health found that Peñafiel and Whole Foods owned Starkey Water had high levels of the toxic metal, arsenic.

== Flavors ==
Peñafiel is produced in orange, lemon, strawberry, grapefruit, arándano (cranberry), coconut water, mango, lime, pineapple, sangria (punch wine), and apple variants.
