= The American Bottling Company =

Bottling company in the United States

- Industry: Bottling and distributing
- Founded: 1998
- Headquarters: Irving, Texas
- Products: Beverages
- Parent: Keurig Dr Pepper

The American Bottling Company, formerly Dr Pepper/Seven Up Bottling Group (1999–2006), Cadbury Schweppes Bottling Group (2006–2008), and Dr Pepper Snapple Bottling Group (2008), is the bottling company of Keurig Dr Pepper, and is a wholly owned subsidiary of that company. It is analogous to the bottling companies Pepsi Beverages Company and Coca-Cola Enterprises, the bottlers of its main competitors.

== History ==
By 1998 Dr Pepper/Seven Up, a subsidiary of Cadbury Schweppes, was hindered by its bottling and distribution systems; owning no private bottling plants, it was dependent on independent bottlers or those controlled by Coca-Cola or Pepsi to bottle its beverages, and those two giant competitors also had better distribution systems and more influence with retail and fast-food chains.

In February 1998 Cadbury Schweppes and U.S. private equity firm Carlyle Group formed a joint venture named the American Bottling Company, initially consisting of the merger of two leading independent bottling groups in the Midwest: Beverage American and Select Beverages. In 1999 the American Bottling Company was combined with the Dr Pepper Bottling Company; the consolidated company, renamed Dr Pepper/Seven Up Bottling Group (DPSUBG), was designed to give Dr Pepper/Seven Up greater control over the distribution of its brands. Several other regional bottlers were acquired by DPSUBG between 1999 and 2006.

Cadbury Schweppes fully acquired the Dr Pepper/Seven Up Bottling Group, the largest independent bottler in the U.S., from the Carlyle Group in 2006, and at that time the bottler was renamed the Cadbury Schweppes Bottling Group. The full ownership allowed the beverage company to establish its own bottling and distribution network for its U.S. soft drink brands, which included Dr Pepper and Snapple.

The Cadbury Schweppes Bottling Group and the other beverage operations of Cadbury Schweppes were spun off in 2008 to form Dr Pepper Snapple Group, which resulted in the bottling company being renamed Dr Pepper Snapple Bottling Group.

In 2008, the Dr Pepper Snapple Bottling Group merged with its own subsidiary, The American Bottling Company, and renamed itself The American Bottling Company.

== See also ==
- List of bottling companies
