= Robert Gamgort =

American businessman

- Born: Robert J. Gamgort
- Education: Kellogg School of Management at Northwestern University (MBA); Bucknell University (BA); London School of Economics
- Title: Executive Chairman of Keurig Dr Pepper

Robert J. Gamgort is an American businessman who is the executive chairman and former CEO of Keurig Dr Pepper, the seventh largest food and beverage company in the United States. Gamgort became president and CEO in July 2018, upon the completion of the merger between Keurig Green Mountain and Dr Pepper Snapple Group, and added the responsibility of Chairman in January 2019. In 2024, Robert Gamgort stepped down as CEO and now holds the position of Executive Chairman of the Board.

== Education ==
Gamgort received his Bachelor of Arts degree in Economics from Bucknell University in Lewisburg, Pennsylvania and studied at the London School of Economics. Gamgort went on to earn an MBA degree from the Kellogg Graduate School of Management at Northwestern University.

== Career ==
=== Before Keurig Dr Pepper ===
Gamgort started his career in marketing at General Foods, which later merged with and became Kraft Foods. He later became President of Major League Baseball Properties, where he transformed the league’s marketing capabilities and played a key role in the resurgence of baseball’s popularity after the 1994 strike.

Gamgort left MLB Properties to join Mars, Incorporated, initially to lead marketing for M&M/Mars, then serving as General Manager of its Chocolate Unit and later becoming President for Mars’ North American portfolio of businesses.

In 2009, Gamgort was named CEO of Pinnacle Foods, owned at the time by The Blackstone Group. In his seven years at Pinnacle Foods, Gamgort significantly increased the value of the company and built a diversified portfolio of well-known brands through a series of acquisitions including, Birds Eye Foods, Wish-Bone Salad Dressings, Gardein Plant Based Protein and Boulder Brands. Gamgort also led Pinnacle’s successful IPO on the NYSE in 2013.

=== Keurig Green Mountain ===
From May 2016 to July 2018, Gamgort served as CEO of Keurig Green Mountain. Under private ownership with JAB Holding Company, Gamgort streamlined operations and improved the fundamentals of the Keurig Green Mountain business. In January 2018, Keurig Green Mountain and Dr Pepper Snapple Group announced a merger and Gamgort was named CEO of the combined company.

=== Keurig Dr Pepper ===
Under Gamgort’s leadership as chairman and CEO, Keurig Dr Pepper has gained market share in the majority of segments in which it operates, including coffee pods, carbonated soft drinks, premium unflavored still water, shelf stable fruit drinks and shelf stable apple juice and apple sauce, and paid back $1.7 billion in debt within the first year as a combined company. In January 2019, Gamgort was named Executive Chairman of Keurig Dr Pepper’s Board of Directors. Keurig Dr Pepper ranked No. 288 on the 2020 Fortune 500 list of the largest United States corporations by total revenue. In April 2024, Gamgort stepped down as the company's CEO, a position he had held since 2018.

== Board affiliations ==
Gamgort is currently a director of National Veterinary Associates (NVA), which was acquired by JAB Holding Company in 2020. Previously he served as an independent Director for Wayfair, Inc., as a Director of the Grocery Manufacturers Association, as a Trustee for Bucknell University, a Director for the NJ State Employment Training Commission and a Trustee for Schiff Natural Lands Trust.
