= Mr & Mrs T =

Drink mixer

- Product type: Beverage
- Current owner: Keurig Dr Pepper
- Country: United States
- Introduced: 1960; 66 years ago
- Website: www.drpeppersnapplegroup.com/brands/mr-and-mrs-t

Mr & Mrs T is an American brand of drink mixers owned by Keurig Dr Pepper (KDP).

== History ==
Mr & Mrs T Bloody Mary mix was first sold by Herb and June Taylor in 1960. They had been in the sauce business and developed their mix to create consistent cocktails. It first was used by bars and restaurants in the Los Angeles metropolitan area and gained wider popularity after it became the choice of American Airlines after it was tasted by an airline executive. Other airlines began using Mr & Mrs T as well.

Taylor Food Products was sold in 1965 and the brand was acquired by Mott's division of Cadbury-Schweppes plc in 1987. By 1997, Mr & Mrs T controlled 62 percent of the Bloody Mary Mix market.

== Mix Flavors ==
- Bloody Mary
- Bold & Spicy Bloody Mary
- Horseradish Bloody Mary
- Mai Tai
- Piña colada
- Strawberry Daiquiri
- Whiskey Sour
- Tom Collins
- Sweet & Sour
- Margarita
- Light Margarita
- Fiery Pepper Bloody Mary

== In popular culture ==
The second episode of Saturday Night Live's eighth season featured a faux commercial with Robin Duke as Mrs. T and Mr. T in a cameo appearance.
