= Albert-Louis Van Houtte =

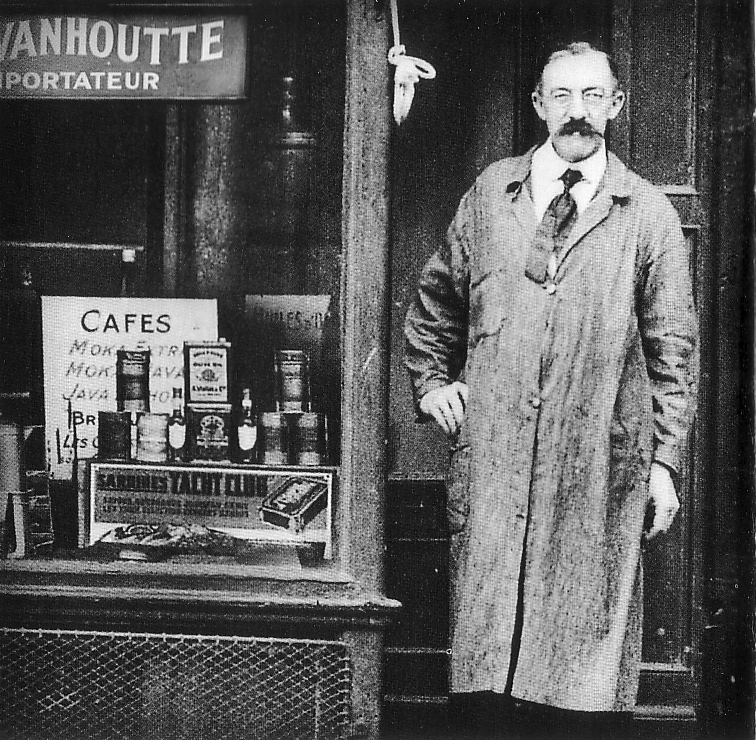
- Albert-Louis’ first store in Montreal, taken on December 18, 1919, the day Albert-Louis became the owner of the store.
- Born: 1877; Tourcoing, France
- Died: April 2, 1944 (aged 67); Montreal, Quebec, Canada
- Resting place: Notre Dame des Neiges Cemetery
- Occupations: Businessman, coffee brewer
- Known for: Founding Van Houtte

Albert-Louis Van Houtte was a French-born Canadian businessman best known for the coffee company Van Houtte.

== Biography ==
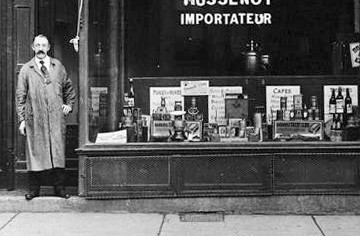
Albert-Louis Van Houtte, 1919

Van Houtte was born in 1877, in Tourcoing, France, then emigrated to Canada in 1912. After the First World War, he attempted a horse importing business, before switching to food retailing. He married Marie-Louise Deherripon and had three children: Christophe Van Houtte, Pierre Van Houtte and Lucy Van Houtte.

On December 18, 1919, he took ownership of Camille Hussenot's import shop from Camille Hussenot. The shop was at 321 Ontario Street East in Montreal. The shop sold water, olive oil, foie gras, tea, coffee makers, soaps, wine and coffee. He also imported other products from Europe, such as cookies and chocolate, SEB kitchen utensils, Creuset cookware and Dessault wine vinegar. The products drew in more customers to the business. He was known for providing very personalized service to customers.

In 1919, Albert-Louis decided that his brewer could not roast a green coffee that was dark enough and so, partly because he loved coffee beans, decided to buy a coffee roaster, and he started to brew his own coffee to sell in his shop. He found particular success with gourmet coffee roasting. In the 1930s, he opened a second store in Quebec.

On April 2, 1944, he died at the age of 67 because of frail health and was entombed at the Notre Dame des Neiges Cemetery in Montreal. He left his company to his three children.
