= Dr Pepper Snapple Group =

American multinational soft drink company (2008–2018)

- Type: Subsidiary
- Traded as: NYSE: DPS (until 2018)
- Industry: Beverage
- Predecessor: Dr Pepper/Seven Up
- Founded: October 7, 2008; 18 years ago
- Defunct: July 9, 2018; 8 years ago
- Fate: Combined with Keurig Green Mountain; renamed Keurig Dr Pepper (2018)
- Successor: Keurig Dr Pepper
- Headquarters: Plano, Texas, U.S.
- Area served: United States, Canada, Mexico
- Key people: Larry Young (former CEO)
- Products: Dr Pepper; Snapple; RC Cola; A&W; 7 Up; Schweppes; Sunkist; Canada Dry; Big Red; Mott's; Vernors; Hawaiian Punch; Nehi; Squirt; Other beverages
- Revenue: 14,057,000,000 United States dollar (2022)
- Operating income: 2,605,000,000 United States dollar (2022)
- Net income: 1,436,000,000 United States dollar (2022)
- Number of employees: 21,000 (2017)
- Parent: Keurig Dr Pepper
- Subsidiaries: Bai Brands; Canada Dry Motts; Grupo Peñafiel

Dr Pepper Snapple Group was an American multinational soft drink company based in Plano, Texas. The company originated as Cadbury Schweppes Americas Beverages, a division of Cadbury Schweppes.

In 2008, it was spun off as the independent Dr Pepper Snapple Group and began trading on the New York Stock Exchange under the symbol "DPS."

The company managed a portfolio of carbonated soft drinks, juices, teas, mixers, and bottled waters, including brands such as Dr Pepper, 7UP (U.S. rights), Snapple, Mott’s, Canada Dry, A&W Root Beer, and Hawaiian Punch.

Prior to its 2018 merger, Dr Pepper Snapple Group ranked as one of the largest nonalcoholic beverage companies in North America, with net sales of $6.69 billion in 2017.

In July 2018, the company was acquired by Keurig Green Mountain, forming Keurig Dr Pepper. Shareholders of Dr Pepper Snapple Group retained a 13% stake in the combined company, while Mondelez International and JAB Holding Company controlled significant shares.

== History ==
=== Origins ===
Dr Pepper Snapple Group traces its origins to Cadbury Schweppes Americas Beverages (CSAB), a division of Cadbury Schweppes created through a series of acquisitions during the 1990s and early 2000s.

In 1995, Cadbury Schweppes purchased Dr Pepper/Seven Up, Inc., adding the Dr Pepper and 7UP brands to its portfolio. In 1998, the company further expanded by acquiring Beverage America and Select Beverages from the Carlyle Group, both significant U.S. bottlers of soft drinks. In 2000, Cadbury Schweppes acquired Snapple, Mistic, and Stewart’s from Triarc Companies for $1.45 billion, followed later that year by the purchase of Royal Crown Cola from Triarc.

Between 2006 and 2007, Cadbury Schweppes consolidated much of its U.S. bottling operations by acquiring Dr Pepper/Seven Up Bottling Group and several regional bottlers, giving the company greater direct control over manufacturing and distribution. In October 2007, Cadbury Schweppes announced plans to separate its confectionery and beverage operations, with the latter becoming an independent publicly traded company.

=== Dr Pepper Snapple Group and distribution agreements ===
In May 2008, the beverage division was demerged, creating Dr Pepper Snapple Group. In 2008, the company acquired a minority interest in Big Red, Inc.

In February 2010, PepsiCo paid Dr Pepper Snapple Group $900 million for a 20-year license to distribute Dr Pepper brands in territories served by its newly acquired bottlers.

In June 2010, The Coca-Cola Company agreed to pay Dr Pepper Snapple Group $715 million for a 20-year license to distribute certain brands in the United States and Canada, with an option to renew for another 20 years. The agreement included adding Dr Pepper brands to Coca-Cola's Freestyle fountain machines.

Following the Coca-Cola agreement, the U.S. Federal Trade Commission required the company to implement safeguards to prevent access to Dr Pepper Snapple's confidential business information.

In 2015, the company acquired a minority stake in Bai Brands for $15 million and, in 2016, announced the full acquisition for $1.7 billion.

=== Merger with Keurig Green Mountain ===
On January 29, 2018, Dr Pepper Snapple was acquired by Keurig Green Mountain in an $18.7 billion transaction. Following the merger, the combined company was renamed Keurig Dr Pepper and began trading publicly on the New York Stock Exchange. Under the terms of the agreement, Dr Pepper Snapple Group shareholders retained a 13% ownership stake in the new entity, with additional stakes held by Mondelez International, and JAB Holdings, which retained majority control. Larry Young, President and CEO of Dr Pepper Snapple Group at the time, transitioned from his executive roles and joined the Keurig Dr Pepper board of directors.

=== Post-merger ===
After the 2018 merger, Dr Pepper Snapple Group’s operations were folded into Keurig Dr Pepper, with its Plano headquarters retained as one of the new company’s main offices. Under Keurig Dr Pepper ownership, legacy brands such as Snapple and Dr Pepper continued to evolve, including the rebranding of Diet Snapple to Snapple Zero Sugar in 2022. By 2024, Dr Pepper had become the second-largest carbonated soft drink in the United States by retail sales, and in 2025 new flavor variants such as Dr Pepper Blackberry were introduced across the portfolio.

== Operations ==
=== Marketing ===
Snapple utilized the slogan "Made from the Best Stuff on Earth", while Dr Pepper maintained campaigns such as "Always One of a Kind". In 2011, the company launched Dr Pepper TEN, a low-calorie cola marketed toward male consumers, with its "It's Not for Women" tagline. Dr Pepper Snapple Group also promoted its brands through major sports sponsorships, including becoming the presenting sponsor of the College Football Playoff, an agreement it extended with ESPN through 2026. The company also signed team partnerships, as the official beverage partner of the Oakland Athletics in 2018 and the exclusive soft drink provider for Major League Soccer’s Houston Dynamo beginning in 2011.

=== Distribution ===
Dr Pepper Snapple Group employed a hybrid distribution model, using both company-owned bottling and distribution operations as well as independent third-party bottlers. This approach allowed the company to maintain direct control in some regions while relying on partnerships in others. In North America, major distribution agreements with PepsiCo and The Coca-Cola Company ensured broad market coverage for its core brands. PepsiCo distributed Dr Pepper in territories served by its bottlers, while Coca-Cola handled brands such as Canada Dry, C’Plus, and Schweppes in the United States and Canada.

=== Governance ===
Dr Pepper Snapple Group maintained its headquarters in Plano, Texas throughout its existence as an independent entity. Larry Young, formerly president and chief operating officer of Cadbury Schweppes Americas Beverages, was chief executive officer from the company's formation in 2008 until its merger with Keurig Green Mountain in 2018. Following the merger, Young transitioned to the board of directors of the combined entity, Keurig Dr Pepper, until 2024.

=== Products ===
Dr Pepper Snapple Group managed a wide range of nonalcoholic beverages, including carbonated soft drinks, juices, teas, mixers, bottled water, and energy drinks. Its soft drink lineup included established brands such as Dr Pepper, 7UP (U.S. rights only), A&W Root Beer, Canada Dry, Crush, Squirt, Sunkist (produced under license), Vernors, RC Cola, and Nehi.

The company also distributed non-carbonated beverages, including Snapple teas and juices, Mott's juices and mixers, Hawaiian Punch, and Vita Coco coconut water.

During the 2000s, the company expanded its portfolio through a series of acquisitions. In 2000, it acquired Snapple, Mistic, and Stewart's from Triarc Companies and later added Royal Crown Cola from the same group. In 2008, shortly after becoming an independent entity, the company purchased a minority interest in Big Red, Inc. In 2015, it invested in Bai Brands, to expand its presence in the low-calorie and antioxidant beverage segment.

== See also ==
- Cola wars
- List of bottling companies
- List of soft drink producers
