= Snapple =

Brand of tea and juice drinks

- Type: Iced tea, juice drink, lemonade, water
- Manufacturer: Keurig Dr Pepper
- Origin: United States
- Introduced: 1972; 54 years ago
- Website: snapple.com

Snapple is a brand of tea and juice drinks owned by Keurig Dr Pepper, based in Plano, Texas, United States. Snapple originated as an apple juice first produced in 1972 by Unadulterated Food Products, with the name Snapple a portmanteau derived from the words snappy and apple.

The brand became popular in the 1990s and 2000s from pop-culture references and sponsorships in television shows, becoming the partial namesake of Dr Pepper Snapple Group in 2008. A series of lawsuits starting the following year questioned the brand's health claims, leading to changes in the products' formula.

== History ==
Snapple was founded by Leonard Marsh, Hyman Golden, and Arnold Greenberg in 1972 in Valley Stream, Long Island, New York. Their company, which was originally known as Unadulterated Food Products, was first conceived as a part-time venture to supply fruit juices to health food stores. Unsure if the business would succeed, Greenberg continued to run his health food store in Manhattan's East Village, while Leonard Marsh and his brother-in-law, Hyman Golden, operated a window washing business. In a 1989 interview with Crain's New York Business, Marsh admitted that when they launched the small business he knew "as much about juice as about making an atom bomb."

An early apple juice product led to the company's name, Snapple. Golden, Greenberg and Marsh had created a carbonated apple juice. One of the batches of apple juice fermented in the bottle, causing the bottle caps to fly off. The original name of that particular apple juice product, Snapple, a portmanteau derived from the words snappy and apple, became the new name for their beverage company. Thus the Snapple Beverage Corporation was born, beginning in the early 1980s. In 1987, Snapple made their first tea, lemon tea.

As of 2016, there are many different types of Snapple: tea (multiple flavors, such as lemon, raspberry, and peach, all of which come in original and diet), juice drinks, lemonade, and bottled water. Snapple also comes in aluminum cans.

Snapple's brand slogan is "Made from the Best Stuff on Earth".

In the early 1990s, Snapple was known for a popular series of TV advertisements featuring Wendy Kaufman (the "Snapple Lady") answering letters from Snapple fans. In May 1992, in an effort to counteract the Coke and Pepsi challenge commercials, Snapple began running a new line of advertisements, which featured its trademark "Made from the best stuff on Earth" line in ads that spoofed earlier beer and sports drinks promotions. The ads received low marks from advertising industry observers. In addition, the company used its $15-million-a-year advertising budget to pay for a long-lived series of live radio commercials featuring controversial radio hosts Howard Stern and Rush Limbaugh.

At the end of the summer of 1992, Snapple conducted a five-week search for a new advertising agency that could better convey its corporate identity in preparation for a wider national push. Later that year, Snapple signed tennis player Jennifer Capriati to endorse its products. By August 1992, Snapple had expanded its distribution to every major city in the United States and signed new contracts with beverage distributors.

The company owned no manufacturing facilities, but instead made agreements with more than 30 bottlers across the country. In this way, Snapple was able to keep its overhead low and its payroll short. The company administration consisted of just 80 employees, 50 of whom worked out of a modest office building on Long Island.

In 1992, Thomas H. Lee, an American businessperson, financier and investor of Thomas H. Lee Partners (THL), acquired Snapple Beverages on undisclosed terms. The three founders of Snapple, Leonard Marsh, Hyman Golden and Arnold Greenberg, said they would own about one-third of the new company and be involved in its management. Hellen Berry, vice president of the Beverage Marketing Corporation, a consultant in New York, estimated that Snapple, which had been for sale for more than a year and had $100 million in sales in 1991, sold for $140 million.

Only eight months after buying the company, Lee took Snapple Beverages public. In 1994, Lee sold the company to the Quaker Oats Company for $1.7 billion. Lee was estimated to have made $900 million for himself and his investors from the sale. Quaker Oats ran into problems and sold Snapple to Triarc in 1997 for $300 million. In September 2000, Triarc sold it to Cadbury Schweppes for $1.45 billion. In May 2008, Snapple was spun off to its current owners.

== Controversies ==
=== Lawsuits ===
In 2009, a consumer lawsuit was brought against Snapple in California. The suit alleged the drinks contained unhealthy ingredients such as high fructose corn syrup and deceptive names on labels that led consumers to believe that certain healthy elements are in the drinks that are not really present.

In 2010, in a lawsuit against Snapple in the federal District of New Jersey, the court certified to the FDA for an administrative determination the question whether high fructose corn syrup (HFCS) qualifies as a "natural" ingredient. In 2010, the FDA responded by letter and declined to provide the court with the requested guidance. Stating that it would take two to three years to engage in a transparent proceeding to elicit the proper public participation, the FDA again cited its limited resources and more pressing food-safety concerns.

In 2011, a New York federal court dismissed a different lawsuit accusing Snapple of misleading consumers by labeling drinks sweetened with high fructose corn syrup as "all natural" when the drink contained no natural juice. The court found that the plaintiffs had failed to show that they were injured as a result of Snapple's labeling.

After the lawsuit in May 2009, Snapple was made with sugar, not high fructose corn syrup. In certain areas the older formula is still sold in stores, but this is becoming increasingly rare.

=== Snapple and New York City schools ===
In October 2003, Snapple began its sponsorship of the New York City public school system, as part of the deal to make Snapple New York City's official beverage. The company promised an $8 million per year profit for city schools if it were allowed to sell its drinks, including juice and bottled water, in school vending machines.

Snapple was able to acquire the contract in part because New York City officials did not want to encourage the consumption of sodas, which have been linked to childhood obesity and diabetes and are generally considered unhealthy. The Snapple juice drinks, specifically created to meet rules banning soda and other sugary snacks from city schools, are marketed under the "Snapple 100% Juiced!" label.

The flavors available under this brand include Green Apple, Fruit Punch, Melon Berry, Grape, Orange Mango, and Strawberry Lime. Although the juice drinks are fortified with vitamins and minerals, an 11.5-ounce bottle contains more sugar (41 grams) than a 12-ounce can of Coca-Cola (39 grams).

Dr. Michael F. Jacobson, the executive director of the Center for Science in the Public Interest, called the drinks "little better than vitamin-fortified sugar water." In addition, the concentrates used in the drinks, apple, grape and pear, are the least expensive and nutritious. Dr. Toni Liquori, associate professor at the Columbia Teachers College, questioned the sale of bottled water in schools, saying "If anything, we should have cold water in our schools."

The deal also gave Snapple exclusive rights to sell its tea and juice-based drinks in vending machines on all New York City properties starting in January 2004. Snapple paid the City $106 million for the rights and agreed to spend $60 million more to marketing and promotion over the length of the five-year contract.

=== K symbol ===
In the early 1990s, the original label graphic on the Iced Tea flavor, a depiction of the United States historical event the Boston Tea Party, was replaced due to misinformation espoused by protest groups claiming the ships on the packaging were slave trading vessels in New York Harbor. Snapple also fell victim to a rumor that the small K was either a representation of the Klan, or of an imagined Jewish Tax, augmented by the fact that all three founders were Jewish. The K on the products actually meant that they were certified kosher. There were also rumors that the company donated to the controversial pro-life organization Operation Rescue.

Snapple initially tried to quell these rumors quietly, but ultimately had to launch a media campaign to quash them, pointing out it would be bad for business to support controversial issues in such a way as the rumors implied. Through a media campaign with the NAACP, Snapple successfully fought back these rumors, although occasionally they are still brought up as fact.

== Real facts ==
Snapple is well known for printing a numbered list of Snapple "Real Facts" on the inside of their bottle caps. A list of these "Real Facts" is available on the company website and fan sites. The "Real Facts" currently go from No. 1 to at least No. 2060, although many numbers in this range have never had facts written for them and have never been put into circulation.

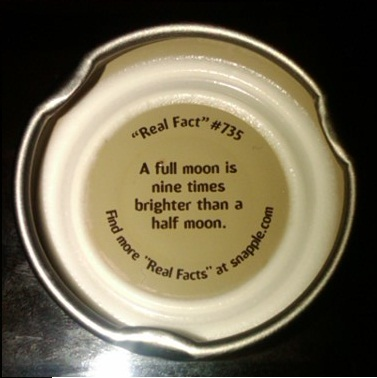
"Real Fact" #735. Each Snapple cap features a random factoid, some of which have been dismissed as misconceptions.

Several of the facts on Snapple caps have been found to be outdated, incorrect or exaggerated.

Fact #	Claim	Reality	Status
20	Broccoli is the only vegetable that is also a flower.	There are other vegetables that are also flowers, such as cauliflower and artichoke.	False
23	The San Francisco cable cars are the only mobile national monument.	The San Francisco cable cars are included in a group known as National Historic Landmarks rather than National Monuments, which are a different designation. There are many ships that are National Historic Landmarks, as well as a few roller coasters.	Exaggerated
31	The average human will eat an average of eight spiders a year while asleep.	This statistic is false and completely impossible, as noted by Scientific American.	False
36	A duck's quack does not echo.	This was tested by Snopes and MythBusters, both of which found that a duck's quack does echo but is hard to distinguish.	Exaggerated
69	Caller ID is illegal in California.	There is no law against Caller ID in the state, though there were lengthy debates about making it illegal in the early 1990s.	False
77	No piece of paper can be folded in half more than 7 times.	This myth was proven wrong by Britney Gallivan in 2002, when she managed 12 folds. In 2005, drawing on Gallivan's accomplishment, MythBusters folded a piece of paper 11 times. The piece of paper used in Mythbusters was an oversized piece of paper that was thinner than a standard 8.5" × 11" (21.59 × 27.94 cm) piece of paper. The wording of "piece of paper" is also a broad statement, as noted by MythBusters.	False
89	The average American walks 18,000 steps a day.	It was found that the average American only walks 5,117 steps a day.	Exaggerated
114	The oldest known animal was a tortoise, which lived to be 152 years old.	In June 2006 a tortoise named Harriet died at 175 years old. The oldest known animal to have lived was named Ming, a clam of the species Arctica islandica, who was killed by researchers at approximately 507 years old.	Outdated
140	Holland is the only country with a national dog.	Holland is a region within the Netherlands, but is not technically a country in its own right. The national dog of the Netherlands is the Keeshond, but other countries such as Mexico also have national dogs.	False
146	The smallest county in America is New York County, better known as Manhattan.	Manhattan is actually the second-smallest county by land area after Kalawao County, Hawaii. The smallest self-governing county is Arlington County, Virginia.	False
162	The temperature of the sun can reach up to 15 million degrees Fahrenheit.	The surface of the Sun can reach 6,000 degrees Celsius, or about 10,000 degrees Fahrenheit. The core of the Sun though can reach 27 million degrees.	False
163	The first penny had the motto "Mind your own business".	The first pennies worldwide date back to the medieval era. The first official one-cent coin (known as a Fugio Cent) of the United States held the message "Mind Your Business". In 1793, the first one-cent coin was struck by the United States Mint.	Misleading
182	A rainbow can only be seen in the morning or late afternoon.	It is true that rainbows can only be seen if the sun is close to the horizon, but it does not need to be morning or late afternoon for a rainbow to appear. Close to the Earth's poles, rainbows can occur in midday when the sun is close to the horizon (no more than 42° high) due to the Earth's axial tilt.	Exaggerated
744	Polar bears can smell a seal from 20 miles away.	According to Sea World, this distance is a much lower limit of about 1 km (0.6 miles).	Exaggerated
761	Owls are one of the only birds that can see the color blue.	Birds in general have excellent color vision. Some are even able to see into the UV spectrum.	False
775	Bees are born fully grown.	Bees hatch from eggs as larvae, then pupate and emerge from pupae as adults.	False
793	Broadway is one of the longest streets in the world. It is 150 miles long.	Broadway terminates 33 mi (53 km) from its Manhattan origin. It continues north of Sleepy Hollow, New York, as U.S. 9 and Albany Post Road.	Exaggerated
794	Mount Whitney, the highest mountain in the continental United States, and Zabriskien [sic] Point, the lowest point in the United States, are less than eighty miles apart.	It is true that Mount Whitney is the highest mountain in the contiguous United States, but the lowest point is Badwater Basin in Death Valley, which is 13 miles further than Zabriskie Point. In a nutshell, the lowest point is 84 miles from Mt. Whitney.	Partly true
825	Our eyes are always the same size from birth, but our nose and ears never stop growing.	The average newborn's eyeball is 16 to 18 millimeters in diameter (axial length). The infant's eyeball grows slightly to approximately 19.5 millimeters and by age 3 to 23mm. The eyeball continues to grow, gradually, to a diameter of about 24–25 millimeters in adulthood.	Partly true
853	Hawaii has its own time zone.	Hawaii shares a time zone with the Aleutian Islands, though the population of the remaining islands is so small that 99.5% of people in Hawaii's time zone do live in Hawaii.	Partly true
868	Thomas Jefferson invented the coat hanger.	Claims that Thomas Jefferson invented the clothes hanger are unfounded, according to the Thomas Jefferson Foundation at Monticello. The modern coat hanger has been patented over 200 times in the U.S. alone since the mid-1800s.	Inconclusive
889	The original Cinderella was Egyptian and wore fur slippers.	"Rhodopis" is considered the earliest known variant of the "Cinderella" story. In the story, Rhodopis is Greek and the slippers are consistently described as rose-gold rather than fur. While Charles Perrault's French re-telling of the story featured fur slippers, it is believed to be an urban legend that vair (fur) was mistranslated as verre (glass).	Partly true
904	If done perfectly, any Rubik's Cube combination can be solved in 17 turns.	The minimum number of turns it takes to solve a Rubik's Cube is 20 in some cases.	False
907	Dueling is legal in Paraguay as long as both parties are registered blood donors.	There is no evidence supporting the claim that dueling is legal anywhere in Paraguay. The U.S. Paraguayan consulate has, in fact, stated that dueling is illegal in the country.	Inconclusive
921	If you had 1 billion dollars and spent 1 thousand dollars a day, it would take you 2,749 years to spend it all.	When counting leap years, it would take one 2,738 years at 1 thousand dollars a day to spend 1 billion dollars.	Exaggerated
975	The letter J is the only letter in the alphabet that does not appear anywhere on the periodic table of the elements.	This was true until 2012, when element 114 was officially renamed flerovium from its initial placeholder name ununquadium. Now both J and Q are missing from the periodic table.	Outdated

== Popular culture ==
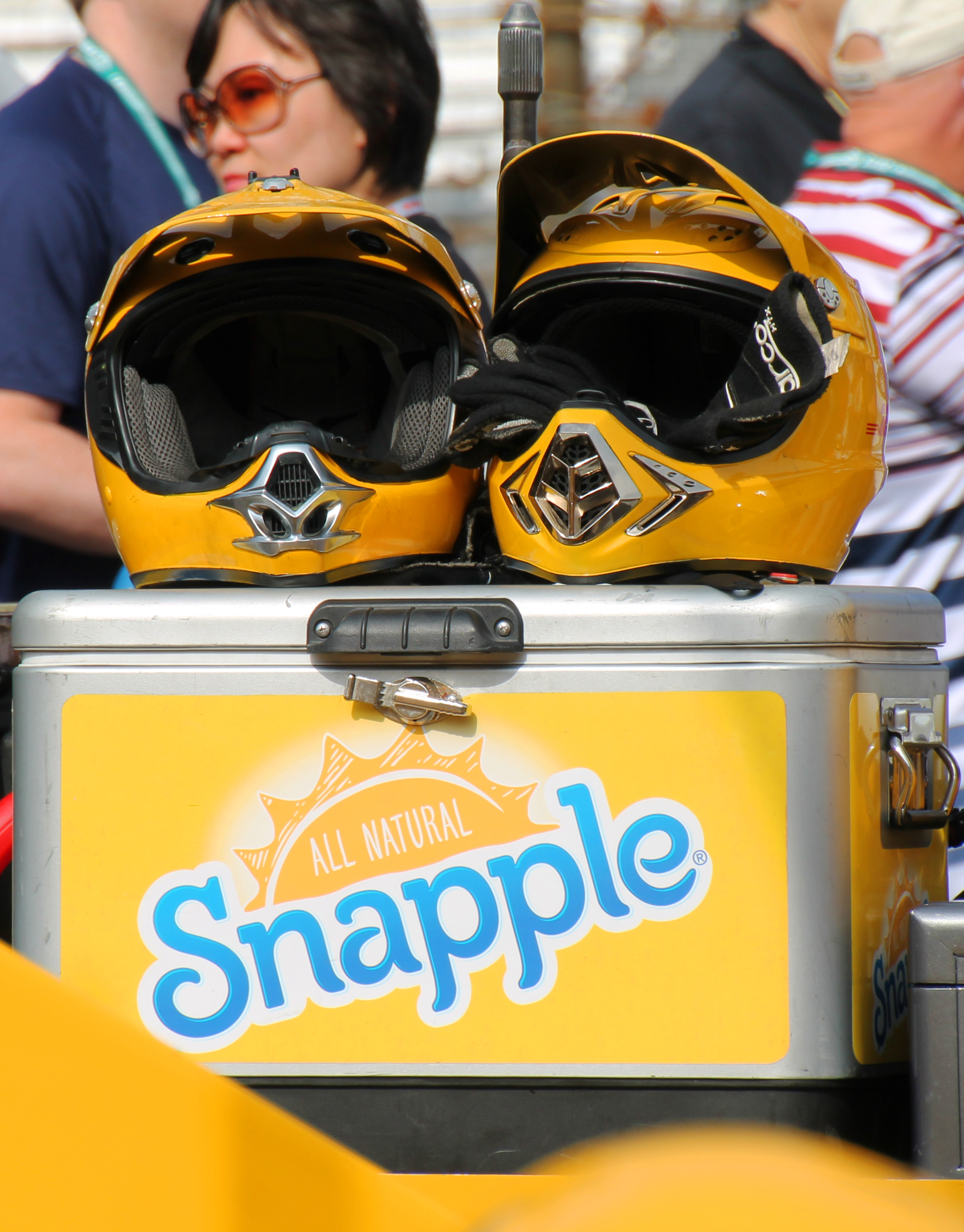
Snapple sponsored Marco Andretti's IndyCar during the 2015 season

Snapple was the official beverage sponsor of America's Got Talent from season 7 to season 9 of the NBC show. Howard Stern, one of the judges on the show, was a spokesperson for Snapple in the 1980s. It was replaced by Dunkin' for season 10.

In the immediate aftermath of the collapse of the World Trade Center on 9/11, New York Paramedic Robert Ruiz was trapped inside a darkened building. He was able to locate a light source, but when he got closer, he discovered it was a refrigerator full of Snapple:

"No, I didn't want a drink. I tell everybody that part about the Snapple. I said, you know, I thought it was light. I thought it was the way out, and it turns out to be a giant refrigerator full of Snapple. I got so mad at that point".

== Snapple Theater Center ==
In 2007, Snapple opened the Snapple Theater Center on 50th Street and Broadway in the heart of New York City's Theater District. It has two theaters, one of which is a traditional theater, the other a thrust stage which can house plays. The center also includes a 40×50 ft (12×15.2 m) rehearsal space which is available for rent. The theaters are considered off-Broadway because of their low seating capacities. The theater has since dropped the Snapple name and sponsorship and is simply known as The Theater Center.

== Kosher Certification ==
Most Snapple drinks have a kosher certification from the OK Kosher Agency. Exceptions include:

- Fruit Punch
- Grape
- Kiwi Lemon-lime

== See also ==
- Kick (soft drink)
