= Dr Pepper/Seven Up =

Soft-drink manufacturing company

Dr Pepper/Seven Up, Inc.
- Logo used from 1997 to 2006
- Traded as: NYSE: DPS
- Industry: Beverages
- Predecessor: Dr Pepper, Incorporated and The 7 Up Company
- Founded: 1986
- Defunct: 2006 (as a company)
- Fate: Acquired then divested
- Successor: Dr Pepper Snapple Group (2006–2018) and Keurig Dr Pepper (2018–present)
- Headquarters: Plano, Texas
- Products: Beverages (non-alcoholic)

Dr Pepper/Seven Up, Inc. (DPSU, or Dr Pepper 7UP, Inc.) was a soft-drink manufacturing company based in Plano, Texas. It was created by the merger of Dr Pepper, Inc. and The 7 Up Company on May 19, 1986. The merger was a result of the independent bailouts of both companies and the subsequent Federal Trade Commission blockage of a Dr Pepper merger with the Coca-Cola Company. The DPSU merger resulted in the breakup of international branding rights held by the two independent companies.

Dr Pepper/Seven Up, Inc. was purchased by Cadbury Schweppes plc and the Carlyle Group on March 2, 1995, after the conglomerate became debt-ridden and insolvent. It sold for about US$1.7 billion, plus about US$870 million of Dr Pepper/Seven-Up debt. This made Cadbury Schweppes the largest soft drink company in the world not to be named after a cola beverage.

In early 2006, Cadbury Schweppes purchased the remainder of Dr Pepper/Seven Up, Inc. and Dr Pepper/Seven Up Bottling Group from the Carlyle Group. All Dr Pepper/Seven Up, Inc. assets were absorbed into Cadbury Schweppes Americas Beverages, which included Mott's Beverages and Snapple Beverages. Dr Pepper/Seven Up Bottling Group was merged with other Cadbury-acquired bottlers and renamed Cadbury Schweppes Bottling Group.

In May 2008, Cadbury Schweppes spun off Cadbury Schweppes Americas Beverages into an independent company called Dr Pepper Snapple Group, and renamed itself to Cadbury plc. Dr Pepper/Seven Up still exists as a trademark and brand name as of 2024.

On July 9, 2018, Keurig acquired Dr Pepper Snapple Group in an $18.7 billion deal. The combined company was renamed "Keurig Dr Pepper" and began trading publicly again on the New York Stock Exchange under the ticker "KDP". Shareholders of Dr Pepper Snapple Group own 13% of the combined company, with Keurig shareholder and Cadbury current owner Mondelez International owning 13% to 14% of that fraction. JAB Holdings owns the remaining, majority, stake.

On September 21st 2020, Keurig Dr Pepper started trading on NASDAQ as NASDAQ: KDP
