= Keurig Dr Pepper =

American beverage company

Keurig Dr Pepper, Inc.
- Type: Public
- Traded as: Nasdaq: KDP; Nasdaq-100 component; S&P 500 component
- ISIN: US49271VAP58
- Industry: Beverage; Appliance manufacturing
- Predecessor: Keurig Green Mountain; Dr Pepper Snapple Group
- Founded: 2018; 8 years ago
- Headquarters: Burlington, Massachusetts, U.S. Frisco, Texas, U.S.
- Key people: Timothy Cofer (CEO); Robert Gamgort (Chairman)
- Revenue: ▲US$16.603 billion (2025)
- Net income: ▲US$2.08 billion (2025)
- Number of employees: 30,600 (2025)
- Subsidiaries: Keurig Dr Pepper Canada, Inc. Grupo Peñafiel; JDE Peet's
- Website: keurigdrpepper.com

Keurig Dr Pepper, Inc. (/ˈkjʊərɪɡ/ KURE-ig) is an American drinks conglomerate with dual headquarters in Burlington, Massachusetts, and Frisco, Texas. The company was formed on July 9, 2018, through the merger of Keurig Green Mountain and Dr Pepper Snapple Group.

The company's portfolio includes ownership of Dr Pepper, Snapple, Crush and Canada Dry. The company manufactures these beverages for the North American market, whilst licensing their manufacturing to third parties in other markets. The company also own and manufacture 7 Up, Schweppes, and RC Cola in North America only, and A&W Root Beer in most judications.

Outside of carbonated beverages, the company also manufactures brewing systems, such as Keurig, alongside coffee blends, such as Green Mountain Coffee Roasters.

== History ==
=== Background ===
Green Mountain Coffee Roasters, founded in 1979 in Vermont as a specialty coffee roaster, expanded nationwide in the late 20th and early 21st centuries. It acquired Keurig, Inc. in 2006 and changed its name to Keurig Green Mountain in 2014. Dr Pepper Snapple Group was established in 2008 after its separation from Cadbury Schweppes, taking ownership of brands including Dr Pepper, Snapple, and 7 Up in the United States. Both companies operated independently until 2018.

=== Formation (2018-2020) ===
In July 2018, Keurig Green Mountain acquired Dr Pepper Snapple Group in a transaction valued at $18.7 billion. Dr Pepper Snapple Group was the legal successor, remained publicly traded, and was renamed Keurig Dr Pepper. The merger created one of the largest beverage companies in North America. On July 10, shares in Keurig Dr Pepper (KDP) began trading on the New York Stock Exchange.

In 2018, KDP acquired regional carbonated‑soft‑drink brand Big Red and premium water brand CORE Hydration. The same year, KDP entered a long‑term distribution agreement with Danone to distribute a natural‑spring water brand in the United States.

In early 2019, Keurig Dr Pepper announced the relocations of its Texas headquarters from Plano to a new 350,000-square-foot office in The Star in Frisco, Texas. In September of that year, McDonald's USA and KDP announced a long-term agreement for the licensing and distribution of McCafé packaged coffee in the United States.

In July 2020, KDP and Polar Beverages entered into a long-term agreement for the nationwide distribution of Polar Seltzer sparkling water products in the United States through KDP’s manufacturing and direct store delivery (DSD) network. The agreement built on an existing relationship in which Polar had been a distributor and manufacturer for KDP in the Northeastern United States. The company then transferred its stock exchange listing to the NASDAQ. Later that year, KDP expanded its DSD network by obtaining distribution rights in New York and New Jersey through an agreement with The Honickman Companies and by acquiring additional territories in East Texas and Northern Louisiana.

=== 2021–2024 ===
In 2021, KDP relocated its beverage research and development laboratory to Frisco, Texas, near its corporate headquarters.

In June 2022, the company entered into a definitive agreement to acquire global rights to Atypique, a Canadian non-alcoholic ready-to-drink cocktail brand offering beverages such as margaritas, gin and tonics, and mojitos. That same month, KDP added Intelligentsia Coffee to its partner portfolio, introducing the brand in K-Cup pod format for the first time.

In November 2022, Keurig Dr Pepper made a US$50 million minority investment in Athletic Brewing Company, a U.S.-based producer of non-alcoholic craft beer. In December 2022, the company invested approximately US$863 million to acquire a 30% stake in Nutrabolt, the manufacturer of C4 Energy. The transaction included a long-term distribution agreement granting KDP rights to distribute C4 in most of its company-owned DSD territories.

In July 2023, the company acquired a 33% stake in La Colombe Coffee Roasters for US$300 million. The investment was accompanied by a long-term sales and distribution agreement for La Colombe's ready-to-drink coffee beverages, along with a licensing arrangement for K-Cup pods in the United States and Canada.

In October 2023, Keurig Dr Pepper signed a long-term distribution agreement with Grupo PiSA to distribute Electrolit, a Mexican sports drink brand, across most of KDP’s company-owned DSD territories in the United States. Distribution began in early 2024. Electrolit entered the U.S. market in 2014 and has become one of the highest-selling brands in the sports hydration category, which was valued at approximately US$11 billion.

In March 2024, KDP announced the development of a line of compostable, plastic- and aluminum-free pods, intended as an alternative to its conventional single-serve products. In May 2024, KDP and its green coffee sourcing division, Keurig Trading, opened a sourcing and logistics office in Varginha, Brazil, a major coffee-producing region.

In April 2024, Tim Cofer was appointed CEO.

Between May and June 2024, the company acquired the production, sales, and distribution operations of Kalil Bottling Co., an independent bottler based in Arizona. This marked the company’s first wholly owned DSD operation in the state. In mid-2024, Dr Pepper surpassed Pepsi to become the second most sold soda brand in the United States, based on retail sales data, trailing only Coca-Cola.

In September 2024, Keurig Dr Pepper entered into a long-term sales and distribution agreement with Black Rifle Coffee Company to launch Black Rifle Energy, a new line of zero-sugar ready-to-drink energy beverages. This expanded upon the companies’ existing collaboration on K-Cup pods.

In October 2024, Keurig Dr Pepper agreed to acquire a 60% stake in Ghost, sports nutrition and energy drink company, for approximately US$990 million. The agreement includes an option to acquire the remaining 40% by 2028. Ghost continues to operate under its existing leadership within KDP's U.S. Refreshment Beverages segment. KDP committed up to US$250 million to support integration into its distribution network. During the same period, the company entered a distribution agreement with Nutrabolt for Bloom, a ready-to-drink sparkling energy beverage.

=== Acquisition of JDE Peet's and de-merger (2025-present) ===
In August 2025, KDP announced that it was acquiring JDE Peet's for €15.7 billion (≈$18 billion) and that it would combine Peet's with its existing coffee division and spin them into a new corporate entity. As part of the plan, the company stated it intends to separate into two U.S.-listed companies, one focused on coffee and one on refreshment beverages, following completion of the acquisition. In October 2025, KDP struck a deal with private-equity companies KKR and Apollo Global Management, along with Goldman Sachs to secure $7 billion in funding to support the acquisition and the planned separation of its coffee and beverage businesses into two public companies.

In January 2026, KDP formally launched its all-cash takeover offer for JDE Peet’s at €31.85 per share after obtaining competition clearances. JDE Peet’s board supported the offer, and shareholders holding 69% of the company’s shares had committed to accept it. The following month, the company secured an additional $1.5 billion in equity funding for the deal. KDP also announced that it was targeting the separation of the combined business into Global Coffee Co and Beverage Co by the end of 2026.

In April 2026, as part of its planned post-acquisition separation, Keurig Dr Pepper named JDE Peet’s chief executive Rafael Oliveira to lead its coffee operating unit and the future Global Coffee Co, while Tim Cofer was set to lead Beverage Co.

== Operations ==
=== U.S. Refreshment Beverages ===
This segment includes the manufacturing, marketing, and distribution of liquid refreshment beverages in the United States. KDP produces beverage concentrates and syrups for its owned brands, which are either distributed to third-party bottlers or processed at company-owned facilities to produce finished beverages. Products are distributed through both direct store delivery and warehouse delivery systems to retail outlets.

Key brands in this segment include Dr Pepper, 7UP, A&W, Canada Dry, Snapple, Mott’s, Clamato, CORE Hydration, Squirt and Sunkist. Additional brands in this segment include Deja Blue, Bai, and Peñafiel.

KDP also manufactures and distributes beverages for partner brands, including the Ghost and C4 energy drinks and the Electrolit hydration drink. It also sells and distributes La Colombe ready-to-drink coffee through its DSD network.

=== U.S. Coffee ===
Keurig Dr Pepper operates in the U.S. coffee market through its Keurig single-serve brewing systems and a broad range of K-Cup pods. The company owns or licenses brands such as Green Mountain Coffee Roasters, The Original Donut Shop, and McCafé. It also manufactures K-Cup pods for partner brands including Starbucks, Dunkin’, Folgers, Peet’s, Celestial Seasonings, Bigelow, and Swiss Miss. In addition to single-serve pods, KDP offers traditional coffee products in whole bean, ground, and ready-to-drink formats.

=== International ===
KDP’s international operations are concentrated in Canada and Mexico. The company manufactures and distributes branded concentrates, syrups, and finished beverages under both owned and partner brands to bottlers, distributors, and retailers.

==== Keurig Dr Pepper Canada ====
Canada Dry Mott's, Inc., operating as Keurig Dr Pepper Canada, is a beverage company based in Mississauga, Ontario, Canada. It was a subsidiary of Cadbury-Schweppes and was previously called Cadbury Beverages Canada Inc. Cadbury plc spun off its beverage division to form Dr Pepper Snapple Group in May 2008 and the name of the Canadian division was changed to the current name. Its major brands include:

- Canada Dry
- CPlus (Sunkist)
- Schweppes
- Orangina (until 2020)
- Snapple
- Dr Pepper
- Crush
- Hires Root Beer
- Mott's
- Clamato
- Mott's Mr & Mrs T
- Nestea (since 2025)

=== Governance ===
Robert Gamgort was the first CEO of Keurig Dr Pepper. In April 2024, Tim Cofer succeeded him as CEO, while Gamgort became executive chairman. In April 2025, Gamgort transitioned to the role of chairman.

== Controversies ==
In 2019, a consumer class-action lawsuit challenged Canada Dry Ginger Ale’s “Made From Real Ginger” labeling as misleading; under the settlement, Keurig Dr Pepper agreed to stop using the phrase on products sold in the United States.

In 2024, the U.S. Securities and Exchange Commission charged Keurig Dr Pepper with making inaccurate statements in its 2019 and 2020 annual reports about the recyclability of K-Cup pods. Without admitting or denying the SEC’s findings, the company agreed to a cease-and-desist order and a $1.5 million civil penalty.

== See also ==
- Beverage industry
- List of soft drink producers
- List of coffee companies
