= James J. Greco =

American businessman and entrepreneur (born 1958)

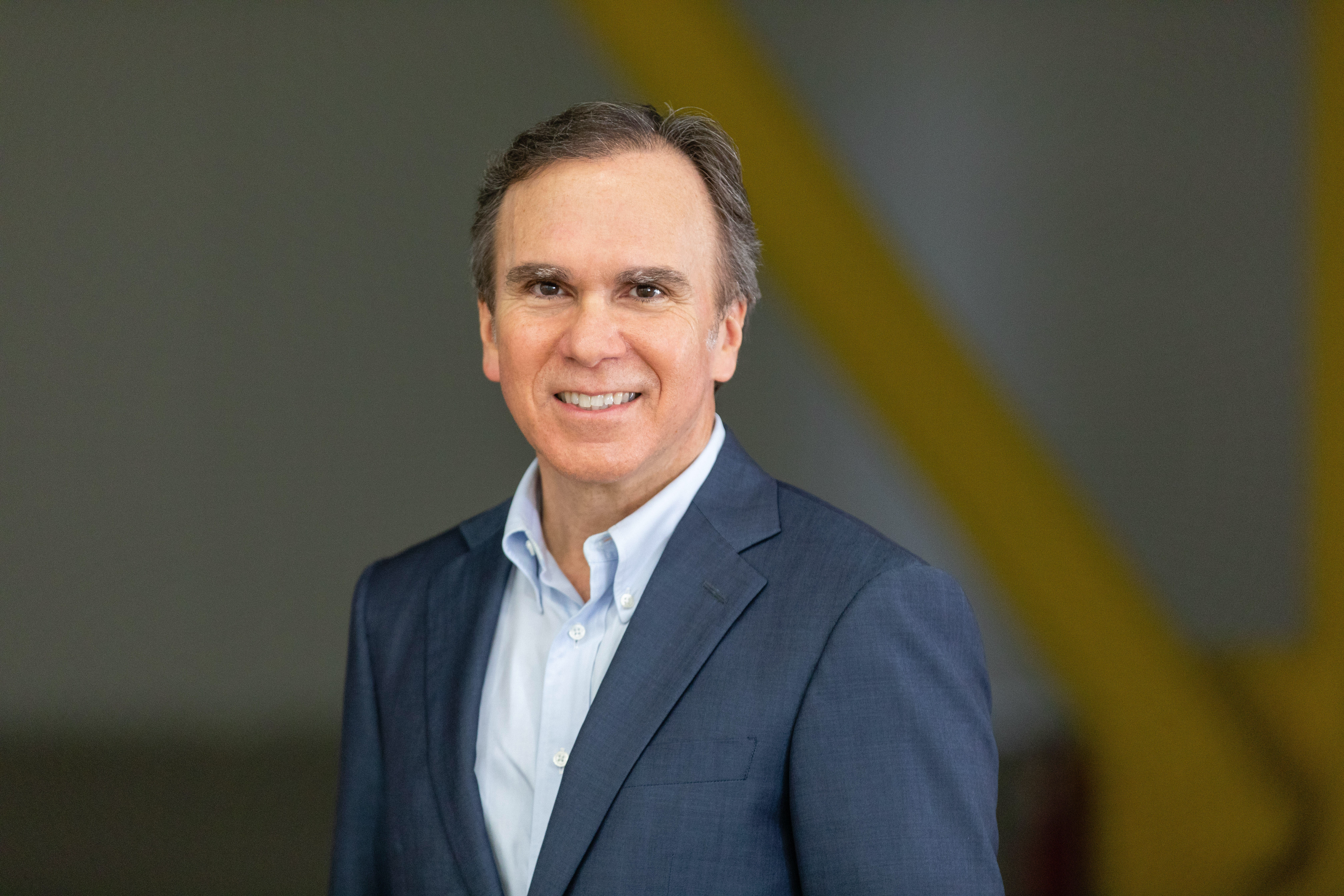
- Greco in 2021
- Born: January 4, 1958 (age 68); New Haven, Connecticut, US
- Education: Georgetown University (A.B.); University of Miami School of Law (J.D.); City University, London, UK
- Occupation: Business executive

James Joseph Greco (born January 4, 1958) is an American businessman. He is the chief executive officer of Tijuana Flats. He has held numerous executive positions in the foodservice industry, as well as various directorships.

== Early life and education ==
Greco was born on January 4, 1958, in New Haven, Connecticut, and grew up in nearby Hamden, Connecticut. He graduated from Hamden High School in 1976, earned a Bachelor of Arts in economics from Georgetown University in 1980 and a J.D. from the University of Miami School of Law, in 1983. He also completed international studies at City University, London, England.

Greco is a member of the Connecticut and Florida Bar Associations; and has been on the boards of directors for the Lender School of Business at Quinnipiac University, Fazoli's Restaurants, Inc., the Connecticut Food Bank, the Greater New Haven Chamber of Commerce, Circle Peak Capital, Share Our Strength: Dine Out, The UCAN Company, and the International Dairy Foods Association. He is on the boards of True Drinks Holdings, Inc., a publicly traded beverage company, Republic Fire Protection, Inc., and the Palm Beach County Food Bank. Additionally, Greco is a managing director at private equity firm Lincoln Road Global Management, a partner at hospitality consulting firm Results Thru Strategy, and president and chief executive officer of foodservice investment firm Pilgrim Holdings.

Greco is married and resides in Delray Beach, Florida. He is the father of two sons, including Sam Greco.

== Career ==
After graduating from law school, he was a partner in the Connecticut-based Greco and Greco law firm, from 1983 to 1991, specializing in consultation to and representation of real estate and corporate clients.

Greco executed one of his first turnarounds at Ellington, Connecticut-based Natural Country Farms, a manufacturer of private label and foodservice fruit juices, where he was COO for five years.

Following Natural Country Farms, he worked for seven years as CEO of Fieldbrook Farms, a $100 million manufacturer of private label ice cream in Dunkirk, New York. A team of investors, led by Greco, took over a failing Fieldbrook Farms and named him CEO. In that capacity, he successfully designed and executed a strategic plan to turn the company around. His efforts resulted in doubled profits and an increase in productivity.

=== Bruegger's ===
Greco joined Bruegger's as CEO in 2003. Following his arrival, the company achieved over twenty consecutive quarters of positive same store sales and total-sales growth. In 2010, Bruegger's announced $254 million in revenue. Under him, the company expanded to over 300 bakery cafés in 26 states, the District of Columbia and Canada. On November 13, 2009, he oversaw their eleventh and largest acquisition to occur during his tenure, when Bruegger's purchased the holdings of Timothy's World Coffee. Through a wholly owned subsidiary, called Threecaf Brands Canada Inc., Bruegger's assumed control of Timothy's three restaurant brands: Timothy's World Coffee, Michel's Bakery Café, and mmmuffins.

On October 5, 2009, he was named operator of the year by the Nation's Restaurant News during the publication's golden anniversary celebration at the 50th anniversary Multi-Unit Foodservice Operators (MUFSO) conference.

=== Le Duff America ===
In March 2011, Groupe Le Duff, a French restaurant group, acquired the Bruegger's chain and its subsidiaries from the private equity firm Sun Capital Partners, earning ownership a return of 36% per year, or 13 times, on its investment and making Groupe Le Duff the second largest bakery café group in the world. Greco was named CEO of the company's American restaurant holdings, under the name Le Duff America, headquartered in Burlington, Vermont; Dallas, Texas; and Toronto, Ontario, Canada. During his tenure, Le Duff America was the parent company of the restaurant chains Bruegger's, La Madeleine, Mimi's Cafe, Brioche Dorée, Timothy's World Coffee, Michel's Bakery Café, mmmuffins, as well as several others. The group, under him, ran over 600 restaurants and annually saw about $450 million in revenue. In December 2011, he announced he would be leaving the company at the end of the year to pursue other opportunities.

=== Sbarro ===
In January 2012, Greco joined Sbarro as CEO, president, and board member. Sbarro, then headquartered in Melville, Huntington, New York, was one of the world's leading Italian quick service restaurant chains and the largest "shopping mall-focused" restaurant concept in the world. Under him, Sbarro operated 1,100 restaurants in nearly 45 countries. Greco, credited with the strong performance and growth of Bruegger's, was recruited to Sbarro to lead its turnaround. Confident about Sbarro's prospects, he designed a short-term strategic plan calling for a focus on "people, place, product and positioning." Longer term, he implemented plans to shift Sbarro from its quick-service, food court based, status into the fast casual arena. He centered on making Sbarro the preeminent fast-casual Italian brand worldwide, an unclaimed position, and one he felt fit Sbarro well. He improved the quality and variety of products, ingredients and preparation. His changes also included an increased emphasis on employee hospitality and a shift from its shopping mall focus to a more store front oriented concept. He believed accomplishing these initiatives would position the firm into fast-casual preeminence. He left the company in late 2013.

=== Consulting and Board assignments ===
Since leaving Sbarro, Greco has held a number of interim executive leadership positions and consulting assignments. These have included President of Newk's Eatery from 2014 to 2016, CEO of True Drinks, Inc. from 2017 to 2018, and Interim CEO of Palm Beach County Food Bank from 2020 to 2021. While at Newks, Greco developed an expansion plan that grew the chain 70% ranking it as the 5th fastest growing chain and resulting in its inclusion in the Nation's Restaurant News' Top 200 for the first time. While at the Palm Beach County Food Bank, he led the charity during the COVID-19 pandemic through the largest increase in demand in its history with distribution increasing three-fold to 2 million pounds of food per month.
