= Bridor =

Companies based in Brittany

Bridor is a bakery product manufacturing company founded by Louis Le Duff in 1988 and a subsidiary of Groupe Le Duff. The company is based in Brittany near Rennes.

It operates in France under the brand Bridor de France and in the UK as Bridor UK. It is listed among the Top Players in the Global Fresh Baked Products Market 2018-2025. In 2018 it introduced a range of smaller 70g sweet-filled croissants to meet demand for reduced portion sizes in the UK.

It is a major supplier to Pret a Manger. Baguettes are prepared in Rennes and frozen for up to a year before being presented as freshly baked in Pret stores.

In 2022 it was forced to abandon its 250 million euro investment project in Ille-et-Vilaine because of environmental opposition.

== Operating sites ==
Bridor manufacturing sites
Name	Country	City	Size (m^{2})
Bridor de France	France	Servon sur Vilaine	42 000 m^{2}
Bridor de France	France	Louverné	32 000 m^{2}
Bridor Pâtisserie	France	Pont de l'Isère	1 300 m^{2}
Graham-Bell Bakery	Canada	Quebec	11 241 m^{2}
De Rouen Bakery	Canada	Quebec	4181 m^{2}
Vineland Bakery	USA	New Jersey	17 050 m^{2}
Amandine	Chine	Pekin	1 500 m^{2}
N/C	Argentine	Buenos Aires	N/C
