= Keurig =

Beverage brewing system

- Product type: Brewing systems Beverage pods
- Current owner: Keurig Dr Pepper
- Country: United States
- Introduced: 1998; 28 years ago
- Previous owners: Keurig, Inc.
- Website: Keurig.com

Keurig (/ˈkjʊərɪɡ/) is a beverage brewing system for home and commercial use. The North American company Keurig Dr Pepper manufactures the machines. The main Keurig products are K-Cup pods, which are single-serve coffee containers; other beverage pods; and the proprietary machines that use these pods to make beverages.

Keurig beverage varieties include hot and cold coffees, teas, cocoas, dairy-based beverages, lemonades, cider, and fruit-based drinks. Keurig has over 400 varieties and over 60 brands of coffee and other beverages through its own and partnership-licensed brands. In addition to K-Cup pods, it includes Vue, K-Carafe, and K-Mug pods.

The original single-serve brewer and coffee-pod manufacturing company, Keurig, Inc., was founded in Massachusetts in 1992. It launched its first brewers and K-Cup pods in 1998, targeting the office market. As the single-cup brewing system gained popularity, brewers for home use were added in 2004. In 2006, the publicly traded Vermont-based specialty coffee company Green Mountain Coffee Roasters acquired Keurig, sparking rapid growth for both companies. In 2012, Keurig's main patent on its K-Cup pods expired, leading to new product launches, including brewer models that only accept pods from Keurig brands.

From 2006 to 2014, Keurig, Inc. was a wholly owned subsidiary of Green Mountain Coffee Roasters. When Green Mountain Coffee Roasters changed its name to Keurig Green Mountain in March 2014, Keurig ceased to be a separate business unit and subsidiary and instead became Keurig Green Mountain's main brand. In 2016, Keurig Green Mountain was acquired by an investor group led by private-equity firm JAB Holding Company for nearly $14 billion. In July 2018, Keurig Green Mountain merged with Dr Pepper Snapple Group in a deal worth $18.7 billion, creating Keurig Dr Pepper, a publicly traded conglomerate which is the third largest beverage company in North America.

== History ==
=== Inception and development ===
Keurig founders John Sylvan and Peter Dragone had been college roommates at Colby College in Maine in the late 1970s. In the early 1990s, Sylvan, a tinkerer, had quit his tech job in Massachusetts and wanted to avoid the issues of brewed coffee becoming bitter, dense and stale with time by creating a single-serving pod of coffee grounds and a machine that would brew it. Living in Greater Boston, he went through extensive trial and error trying to create a pod and a brewing machine. By 1992, to help create a business plan, he brought in Dragone, then working as director of finance for Chiquita, as a partner. They founded the company in 1992, calling it Keurig; Sylvan later said that the name came from his having "looked up the word excellence in Dutch". Although an individual named Dick Sweeney is sometimes considered the third founder of Keurig, Sylvan does not contend with this claim. Sylvan agrees that Sweeney joined the company, but that this occurred after at least two years into the company's founding.

The prototype brewing machines were also a work in progress and unreliable, and the company needed funds for development. That year, they approached what was then Green Mountain Coffee Roasters, and the specialty coffee company first invested in Keurig at that time. Keurig needed sizeable venture capital; and after pitching to numerous potential investors, the partners finally obtained $50,000 from Minneapolis-based investor Food Fund in 1994, and later the Cambridge-based fund MDT Advisers contributed $1,000,000. In 1995, Larry Kernan, a principal at MDT Advisers, became Chairman of Keurig, a position he retained through 2002. Sylvan did not work well with the new investors, and in 1997, he was forced out, selling his stake in the company for $50,000. Dragone left a few months later but decided to retain his stake.

=== Launch ===
In 1997, Green Mountain Coffee Roasters became the first roaster to offer its coffee in the Keurig "K-Cup" pod for the newly market-ready Keurig Single-Cup Brewing System, and in 1998, Keurig delivered its first brewing system, the B2000, designed for offices. Distribution began in New York and New England. The target market at that time was still office use, and Keurig hoped to capture some of Starbucks' market. To satisfy brand loyalty and individual tastes, Keurig found and enlisted a variety of regionally known coffee brands that catered to various flavor preferences. The first of these was Green Mountain Coffee Roasters, and additional licensees for the K-Cup line included Tully's Coffee, Timothy's World Coffee, Diedrich Coffee, and Van Houtte, although Green Mountain was the dominant brand. Keurig also partnered with a variety of established national U.S. coffee brands for K-Cup varieties, and in 2000, the company also branched out the beverage offerings in its K-Cup pods to include hot chocolate and a variety of teas. The brewing machines were large and hooked up to an office's water supply; Keurig sold them to local coffee distributors, who installed them in offices for little or no money, relying on the K-Cups for profits.

Keurig is credited with creating a new category with their cup-at-a-time pod-style brewing, a novel product and business model at the time.

In 2002, Keurig sold 10,000 commercial brewers. Consumer demand for a home-use brewer version increased, but manufacturing a model small enough to fit on a kitchen counter and making them inexpensively enough to be affordable to consumers, took time. Office models were profitable because the profits came from the high-margin K-Cups, and one office might go through up to hundreds of those a day.

By 2004, Keurig had a prototype ready for home use, but so did large corporate competitors like Salton, Sara Lee, and Procter & Gamble, which introduced their single-serve brewers and pods. Keurig capitalized on the increased awareness of the concept and sent representatives into stores to do live demonstrations of its B100 home brewer and give out free samples. Keurig and K-Cups quickly became the dominant brand of home brewers and single-serve pods.

=== Acquisition by Green Mountain Coffee Roasters ===
In 2006, the publicly traded Vermont-based specialty-coffee company Green Mountain Coffee Roasters (GMCR) – which had successively invested in and acquired increasing percentage ownership of Keurig in 1993, 1996, and 2003, by which time it had a 43% ownership – completed its full acquisition of Keurig. Green Mountain also acquired the four additional Keurig licensees, Tully's Coffee, Timothy's World Coffee, Diedrich Coffee, and Van Houtte, in 2009 and 2010.

The joining of Keurig and Green Mountain combined a highly technological brewing-machine manufacturer and a nationwide high-end coffee provider into one company and created an effective "razor/razorblade" model that allowed for explosive growth and high profits. By 2008, K-Cup pods became available for sale in supermarkets across the U.S. Coffee pod machine sales overall multiplied more than six-fold over the six years from 2008 to 2014. In 2010, Keurig and K-Cup sales topped $1.2 billion. The high-margin profits from K-Cup pods are the bulk of the company's income; for the fiscal year 2014, Keurig generated $822.3 million in sales from brewers and accessories, while the pods had $3.6 billion in sales.

In February 2011, Green Mountain announced an agreement with Dunkin' Donuts to make Dunkin’ Donuts coffee available in single-serve K-Cup pods for use with Keurig Single-Cup Brewers. In addition, participating Dunkin’ Donuts restaurants occasionally offer Keurig Single-Cup Brewers for sale. In March 2011, Green Mountain Coffee and Starbucks announced a similar deal whereby Starbucks would sell its coffee and tea in Keurig single-serve pods and would, in return sell Keurig machines in their stores as part of the deal.

=== Additional products and developments ===
The company introduced the Keurig Vue brewer, paired with new Vue pods, in February 2012, seven months before the key patent on the K-Cup expired in September 2012. The Vue system was announced as having customizable features so consumers had control over the strength, size, and temperature of their beverages, and the Vue pod is made of recyclable #5 plastic. The Vue brewer was discontinued in 2014, although Keurig still sells the Vue pods.

In November 2012, GMCR released its espresso, cappuccino, and latte brewer, the Rivo, co-developed with the Italian coffee company Lavazza; it was discontinued in December 2016. In the fall of 2013, the company released a full-pot brewer, the Keurig Bolt, mainly used in offices; it was discontinued in December 2016.

In November 2013, Keurig opened a retail store inside the Burlington Mall in Burlington, Massachusetts. The store features the full line of Keurig machines and accessories and nearly 200 varieties of K-Cups for creating individualized 3-, 6-, or 12-pod boxes.

In February 2014, The Coca-Cola Company purchased a 10% stake in Green Mountain Coffee Roasters, valued at $1.25 billion, with an option to increase their stake to 16%, which was exercised in May 2014. The partnership was part of Coca-Cola's support of a cold beverage system developed by Keurig to allow customers to make Coca-Cola and other brand beverages at home. In January 2015, the company made a similar deal with Dr Pepper Snapple Group, but without a stockholder stake. The cold beverage system Keurig Kold, launched in September 2015.

==== Keurig Green Mountain ====
In early March 2014, shareholders of Keurig's parent company, Green Mountain Coffee Roasters, voted to change its name to Keurig Green Mountain to reflect its business of selling Keurig coffee makers. Keurig Green Mountain's stock-market symbol remained "GMCR".

In the fall of 2014, Keurig Green Mountain introduced the Keurig 2.0 brewer, with technology to prevent old or unlicensed pods from being used in the brewer. The digital lock-out sparked hacking attempts and anti-trust lawsuits. The Keurig 2.0 K-Cup pods come in 400 varieties from 60 brands, and as of 2015, the 2.0 K-Cup, K-Carafe, and K-Mug pods encompass 500 varieties from 75 brands. The 2.0 brewer also has the capacity to brew full carafes in three settings, from 2 to 5 cups, via the use of the new K-Carafe pod.

In March 2015, Keurig launched the K-Mug pod, a recyclable pod that brews large travel mug–sized portions. The K-Mug pods, for use in the Keurig 2.0 brewing system, brew 12-, 14-, and 16-ounce cups, and the plastic is recyclable #5 polypropylene plastic.

In mid-2015, Keurig debuted the K200, a smaller Keurig 2.0 model that can brew single cups or four-cup carafes and comes in various colors. General Electric announced that its new Café French Door refrigerator, due out in late 2015, will have a Keurig coffee machine built into the door.

In September 2015, Keurig launched a line of Campbell's Soup available in K-Cups. The Campbell's Fresh-Brewed Soup Kits come with a packet of noodles and a K-Cup soup pod. The product is available in two varieties: Homestyle Chicken Broth & Noodle, and Southwest Style Chicken Broth & Noodle.

Also in September 2015, Keurig launched Keurig Kold, a brewer that creates a variety of cold beverages including soft drinks, functional beverages, and sparkling waters. The machine brews beverages from The Coca-Cola Company (e.g. Coca-Cola, Diet Coke, Coke Zero, Sprite, Fanta) and the Dr Pepper Snapple Group (e.g. Dr Pepper, Canada Dry) and Keurig's line of flavored sparkling and non-sparkling waters and teas, sports drinks, and soda-fountain drinks.

In December 2015, it was announced that Keurig Green Mountain would be sold to an investor group led by private-equity firm JAB Holding Company for nearly $14 billion. The acquisition was completed in March 2016.

==== Keurig Dr Pepper ====
In July 2018, Keurig Green Mountain merged with Dr Pepper Snapple Group in a deal worth $18.7 billion, creating a publicly traded conglomerate that is the third largest beverage company in North America.

Keurig launched Drinkworks Home Bar in late 2018, developed by Keurig Dr Pepper and AB InBev. The machine creates cocktails, beers and ciders through 24 different pods. The device launched to the general public in 2019. In December 2021 Keurig announced it was discontinuing the platform and offered refunds for the machines to purchasers.

== Products ==
=== Keurig K-Cup brewing systems ===
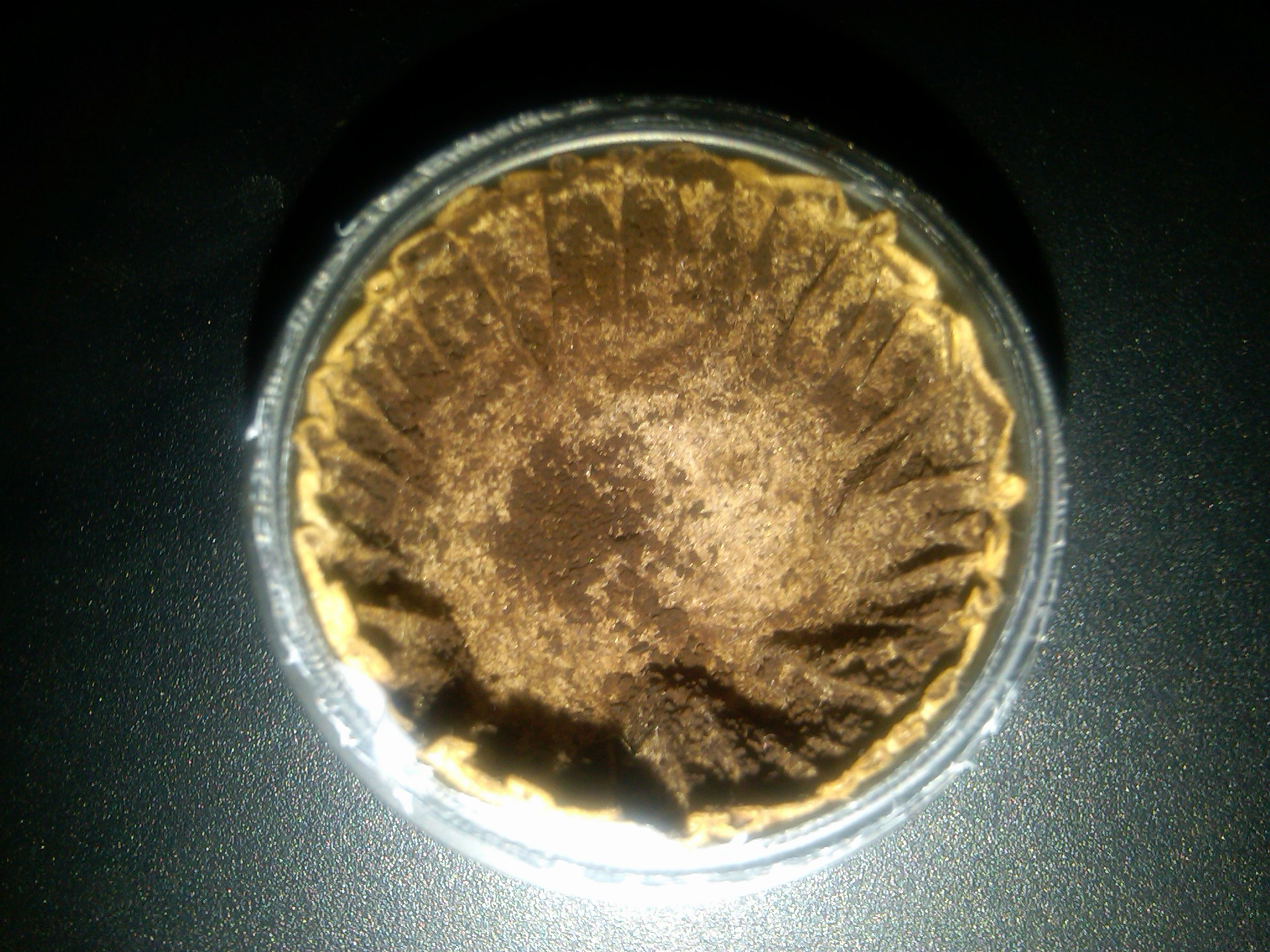
The inside of a used K-Cup pod, with the top foil and the used coffee grounds removed, revealing the filter

The company's flagship products, Keurig K-Cup brewing systems, are designed to brew a single cup of coffee, tea, hot chocolate, or other hot beverage. The grounds are in a single-serve coffee container, called a "K-Cup" pod, consisting of a plastic cup, a foil lid, optional filter paper, and an optional shim. Each K-Cup pod is filled with coffee grounds, tea leaves, cocoa mix, fruit powder, or other contents, and is nitrogen flushed, sealed for freshness, and impermeable to oxygen, light, and moisture.

The machines brew the K-Cup beverage by piercing the aluminum foil seal with a spray nozzle, while piercing the bottom of the plastic pod with a discharge nozzle. Grounds contained inside the K-Cup pod are in a paper filter. Hot water is forced under pressure through the K-Cup pod, passing through the grounds and through the filter. A brewing temperature of 192 °F (89 °C) is the default setting, with some models permitting users to adjust the temperature downward by five degrees.

The key original patent on the K-Cup expired in 2012. Keurig has later patents, including on the filtration cartridge used in K-Cups, and has also launched a number of new pods since the beginning of 2012.

=== Brewing system models ===
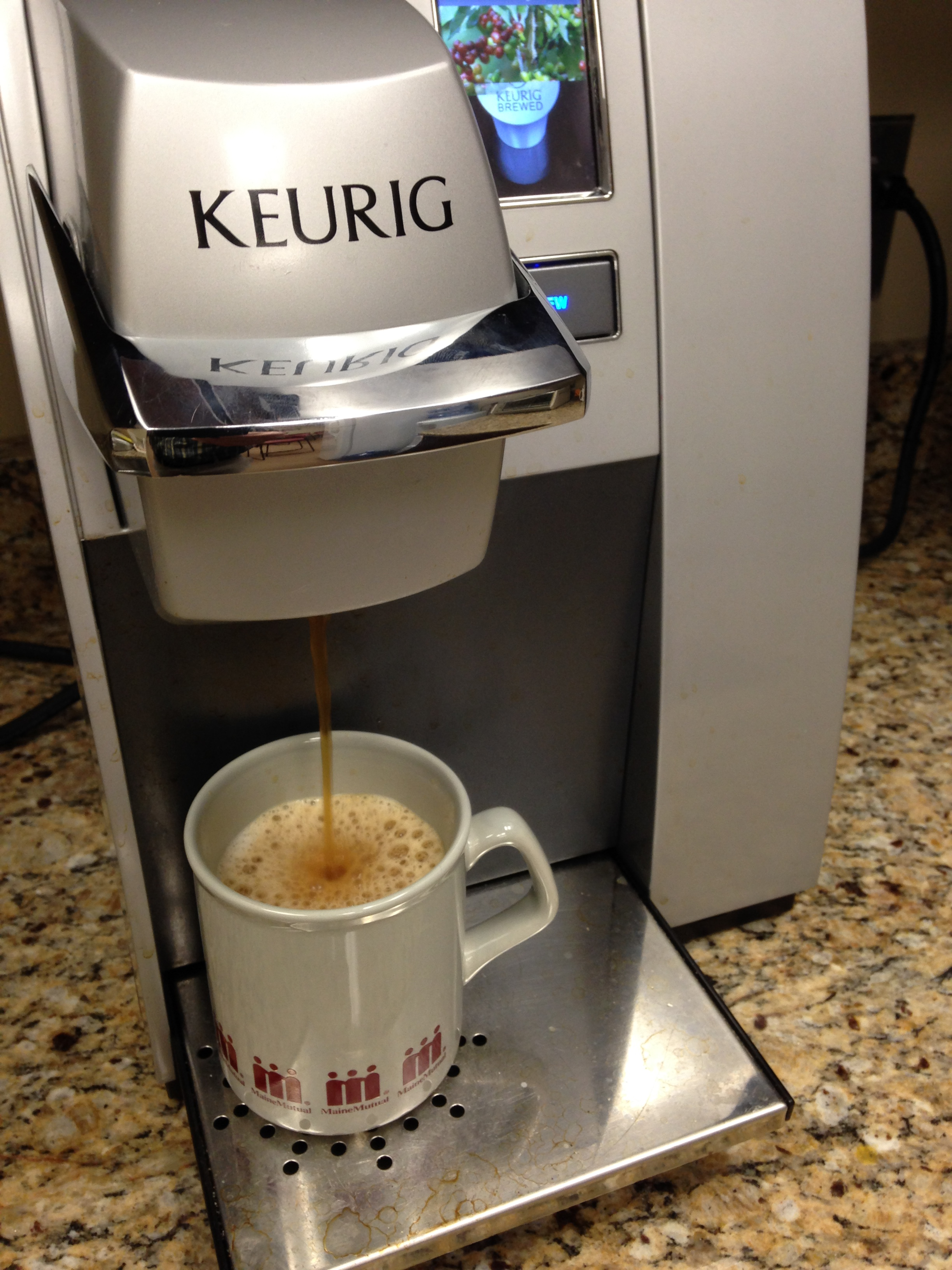
A Keurig coffee maker (2013)

Keurig sells many brewing system models, for household and commercial use. Licensed models from Breville, Cuisinart, and Mr. Coffee, were introduced in 2010.

Its brewing systems for home use include single-cup brewers, and brewers that brew both single-cups and carafes. Keurig also sells commercial brewing models for offices and commercial venues. Keurig also licenses their brewing system for use in other appliances such as refrigerators.

=== Beverage varieties and brands ===
Through its owned brands and through its partnerships and licensing, as of 2015 Keurig's K-Cups and other pods offer more than 400 beverage varieties from 60 brands, including the top ten best-selling coffee brands in the U.S. The beverages include coffees, teas, hot chocolates and cocoas, dairy-based beverages, lemonades, cider, and fruit-based drinks. Keurig also offers Brew Over Ice pods for cold versions of teas, fruit drinks, and coffees.

==== Keurig-owned brands ====
As of 2024, brands owned by Keurig Dr Pepper for use in its K-Cups and sometimes other coffee products include the following:

- Barista Prima Coffeehouse
- Café Escapes
- Cinnabon
- Gloria Jean's Coffees
- Green Mountain Coffee Roasters
- Kahlúa
- Krispy Kreme
- McCafé
- Newman's Own Organics
- Panera Bread at Home
- The Original Donut Shop Coffee
- Revv
- Swiss Miss
- Tully's Coffee
- Van Houtte

==== Keurig partner brands ====
As of 2024, brands that Keurig Dr Pepper has a partnership with for selling K-cups include the following:

- Bigelow Tea Company
- BLK & Bold Specialty Beverages
- Café Bustelo
- Caribou Coffee
- Celestial Seasonings
- Chock full o'Nuts
- Dunkin' Donuts
- Eight O'Clock Coffee
- Folgers
- French Market Coffee
- Gevalia
- Hills Bros. Coffee
- Illy
- Intelligentsia Coffee & Tea
- Kauai Coffee Company
- La Colombe Coffee Roasters
- Lavazza
- Lipton
- Maxwell House
- New England Coffee
- Peet's Coffee
- Philz Coffee
- Seattle's Best Coffee
- Starbucks
- Tazo
- Tim Hortons
- Twinings

== Competition ==
Various coffee capsule closed systems compete with Keurig for market share in the United States, namely, Nespresso and Bruvi. However, Keurig still retains market share dominance in the United States.

== Awards ==
Keurig was named Single Serve Coffee Maker Brand of the Year for four consecutive years from 2012 to 2015 by the Harris Poll EquiTrend Study.

Some of Keurig's additional awards since 2012 have included:

- 2013 "Best All Around" in Best Single-Serve Coffeemakers – Keurig Vue (Good Housekeeping Research Institute)
- 2013 Edison Awards Gold Award for Consumer Packaged Goods, Beverage Preparation – Keurig Vue
- 2014 Top 10 Breakaway Brands (Landor Associates)
- 2014 Food and Beverage Innovators Award – Bolt Packs (National Restaurant Association)
- Most Recommended Single Serve Pod Coffee Maker 2014 (Women's Choice Award)
- 50 Best U.S. Manufacturers 2014 (IndustryWeek)

== Corporate affairs ==
=== Environmental impact ===
In the 2010s, beginning primarily with a 2010 article in The New York Times, Keurig has been publicly criticized by environmental advocates and journalists for the billions of non-recyclable and non-biodegradable K-Cups consumers purchase and dispose of every year, which end up in landfills. Some competing single-cup brands have single-serve pods that are recyclable, reusable, compostable, or biodegradable.

The cup portion of the K-Cup is made of #7 plastic, and although according to the company it is BPA-free, safe, and meets or exceeds applicable FDA standards, it cannot be recycled in most places. Even in the few locations in Canada where #7 plastic is recycled, the small size of the pods means they can fall through sorting grates.

In late 2005, Green Mountain and Keurig launched the My K-Cup reusable and refillable pod, which could be filled with any brand of coffee. The product was discontinued in August 2014 with the launch of the Keurig 2.0 brewing system, and the 2.0 did not accept the My K-Cup pods. Consumer backlash prompted the company to announce in May 2015 that it was bringing back the My K-Cup and making it compatible with the 2.0 brewers.

In 2011, GMCR launched the Grounds to Grow On program, in which office customers purchase recovery bins for used K-Cups, which are shipped to Keurig's disposal partner, which composts the coffee grounds and sends the pods to be incinerated in a waste-to-energy power plant. Critics point out that incineration produces airborne pollutants.

Regarding potential recyclability, GMCR's vice president of sustainability stated in 2013 that "The system has a lot of pretty demanding technical requirements in terms of being able to withstand certain amount of temperature and to have a certain kind of rigidity, and provide the right kinds of moisture barriers and oxygen barriers and the like. So it isn't the simplest challenge." In 2015, Keurig Green Mountain's chief sustainability officer stated that every new K-Cup spin-off product introduced since 2006 – including the Vue, Bolt, K-Carafe, and K-Mug pods – is recyclable if disassembled into paper, plastic, and metal components. James Hamblin, writing in The Atlantic, argues that the level of conscientiousness required to disassemble the cups is somewhat of a paradox to expect from people using a push-button brewing process. In its 2014 Sustainability Report, released in February 2015, Keurig Green Mountain re-affirmed that a priority for the company is ensuring that 100% of K-Cup pods are recyclable by 2020.

In August 2014, the Canadian chain OfficeMax Grand & Toy partnered with the New Jersey company TerraCycle to launch a K-Cup recycling program for businesses in Canada, using a recycling box purchased by the businesses and shipped to TerraCycle for recycling when full. In February 2015, TerraCycle launched a similar program for residential use in the U.S.: consumers purchase a Zero Waste Box which can hold 600 capsules, and when full, the box, which has a pre-paid UPS label, is shipped to TerraCycle for recycling.

In 2015, Egg Production created a Cloverfield-like short video on YouTube entitled "Kill The K Cup" to promote awareness of the waste impact of K Cup, starting the hashtag #KillTheKCup, and reporting that there were enough K pods sold in 2014 to circle the earth 10.5 times.

=== Legal and media issues ===
In early 2014, following the announcement of its Keurig 2.0 machines engineered to lock out unlicensed pods, seven competitors and a number of purchasers filed lawsuits in Canada and in various United States federal courts. The complaints contain numerous allegations of anti-competitive actions designed to drive competitors out of Keurig's market.

To handle the U.S. anti-competitive lawsuits, in June 2014 the United States Judicial Panel on Multidistrict Litigation consolidated the litigation into one docket in the Southern District of New York, where Judge Vernon S. Broderick heard the consolidated case. The case had 46 plaintiffs, consisting of indirect purchasers, direct purchasers, and two competitors. Common allegations of the multidistrict litigation include claims that Keurig improperly acquired competitors, entered into exclusionary agreements with suppliers and distributors to prevent competitors from entering the market, engaged in unwarranted patent-infringement litigation, and unfairly introduced a product redesign that locks out non–Keurig branded cups.

The introduction of the Keurig 2.0 brewer also sparked a number of hacks and workarounds by competitors and consumers in 2014. Rogers Family Coffee, one of the plaintiffs in the anti-trust lawsuits, created a "Freedom Clip" allowing unauthorized pods to work in the brewer. Another plaintiff, TreeHouse Foods, claimed to be able to produce its own pods that would work in the 2.0 system. A Canadian company, Mother Parkers Tea & Coffee, announced a capsule which would be compatible with the Keurig 2.0.

In December 2014, the company recalled about 7 million of its Keurig Mini Plus Brewing Systems manufactured between December 2009 and July 2014 and sold in the U.S. and Canada. The recall was due to burn injuries reported from water overheating and spewing out of some of the machines, particularly if used to brew more than two cups in quick succession.

By the first quarter of 2015, Keurig sales had dropped 23 percent year over year partly due to unease over Keurig 2.0. In response, Keurig announced they would revive the reusable My K-Cup product by the end of the year.

In November 2017, Keurig posted on its Twitter account that it had ended its advertisements with Sean Hannity's program on Fox News, in reaction to Hannity's defense of Senate candidate Roy Moore, who had been accused of sexual misconduct against teenage girls. In response, videos of Hannity's fans destroying their Keurig machines proliferated on the Internet, with automated Russian accounts supporting Hannity's position on Twitter. In an internal email, Keurig CEO Bob Gamgort wrote that the way Keurig handled the situation was "highly unusual" and gave the unintended impression that the company had taken sides. Gamgort also announced an overhaul of Keurig's communications policies.

In October 2020, Keurig agreed to settle for $31 million an antitrust lawsuit alleging they cornered the single-serve brewer market by making their machines only accept K-Cup coffee pods. Affected consumers had until July 15, 2021, to file a claim for the class action settlement.

=== Corporate governance ===
John Sylvan and Peter Dragone founded Keurig, Inc. in 1992, In 1995, Larry Kernan, a principal at MDT Advisers – an investment fund which had contributed $1,000,000 to the company – became Chairman of Keurig; he retained the position through 2002. Sylvan was forced out of the company in 1997, and Dragone left a few months later. Sweeney stayed on as the company's vice president of engineering; he later became Vice President of Contract Manufacturing and Quality Assurance.

Nick Lazaris was president and CEO of Keurig, Inc. from 1997 to 2006. Keurig, Inc. was fully acquired by Green Mountain Coffee Roasters in 2006; at the time, GMCR's founder Bob Stiller was its president and CEO. Stiller stepped down in 2007, but remained chairman until May 2012. Lawrence J. Blanford became Green Mountain Coffee Roasters' President and CEO in 2007. Brian Kelley, previously chief product supply officer of Coca-Cola Refreshments, became the president and CEO of Green Mountain Coffee Roasters (later Keurig Green Mountain) in December 2012. Robert Gamgort, who had been CEO of Pinnacle Foods, replaced Brian Kelley as Keurig Green Mountain's CEO in May 2016 after KGM was acquired by an investor group led by JAB Holding Company, and he remains CEO of the newly merged, publicly traded conglomerate Keurig Dr Pepper.
