= Newks =

Newks may refer to:

- Newk's Eatery, an American chain of fast casual cafés
- Newark Newks, a Newark, Ohio baseball team
