= Bruegger's =

Restaurant operator in the United States

Bruegger's Enterprises, Inc.

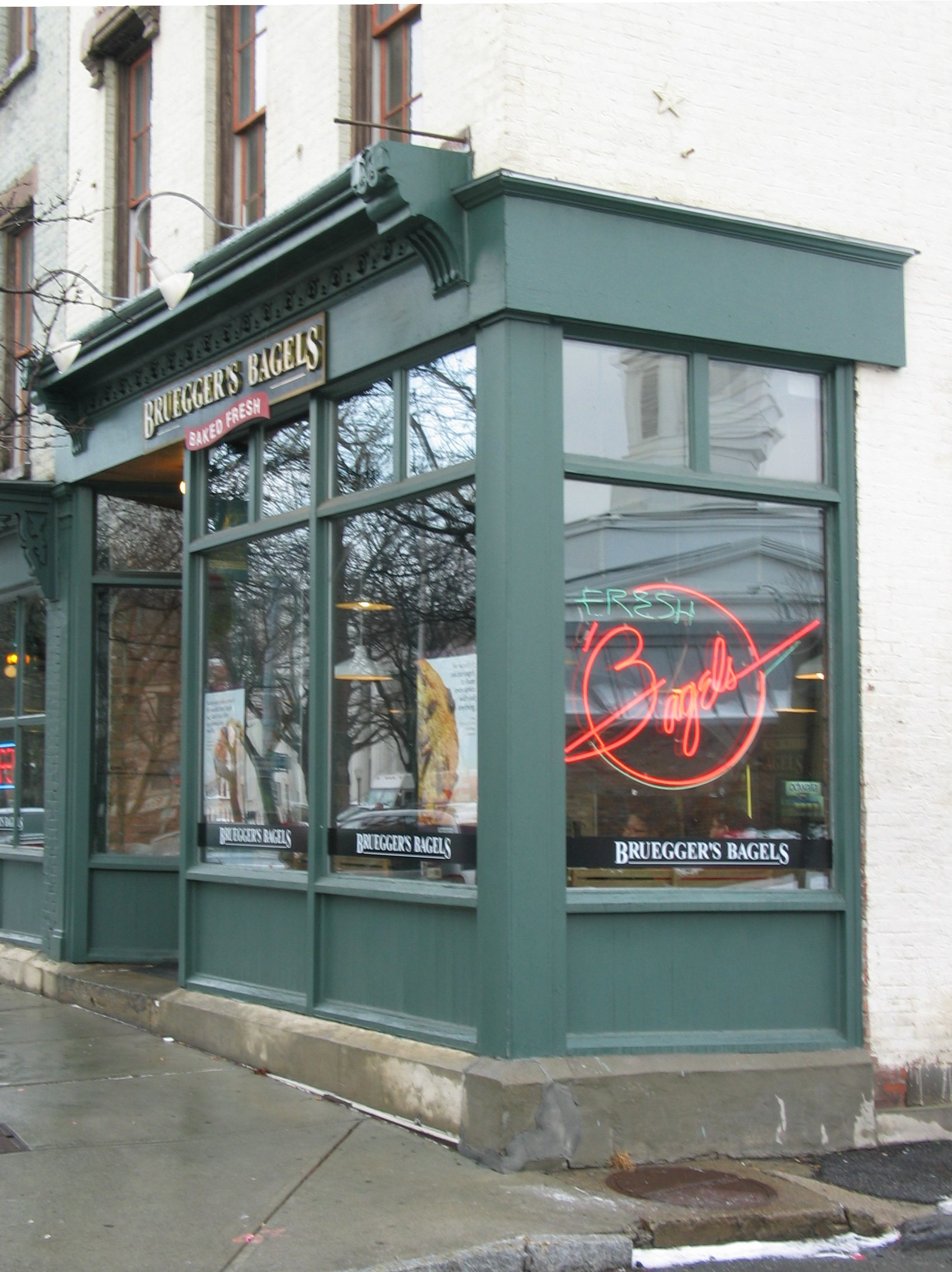
- The original Bruegger's Bagels, Troy, New York
- Type: Subsidiary
- Industry: Restaurants Franchising
- Founded: 1983; 43 years ago in Troy, New York
- Founder: Nordahl Brue; Michael Dressell
- Headquarters: Burlington, Vermont, United States
- Number of locations: 164 (2026)
- Products: Fast casual/Bakery-café, including several varieties of bagels and muffins, hot & cold sandwiches, and coffee.
- Parent: JAB Holding Company
- Website: Brueggers.com

Bruegger's Enterprises, Inc. is a restaurant operator and subsidiary of the Luxembourg-based company JAB Holding Company. Bruegger's and its wholly owned subsidiary Threecaf Brands Canada, Inc., are franchisers and operators of Bruegger's bakery-cafés, and Michel's Baguette.

Bruegger's Bagels produce approximately 70 million bagels each year, and they hold the Guinness World Record for producing the world's largest bagel. The company is the largest bakery of authentic New York style, kettle-boiled bagels in the U.S., with each location baking their 14 flavors of bagels on-site each morning in small batches. Bruegger's also specializes in made-in-Vermont cream cheese, served in over 11 flavors.

Aside from bagels, Bruegger's has a regular menu for dine-in, takeout, or delivery including: egg sandwiches, lunch deli sandwiches, muffins, cookies, side choices, and coffee, espresso drinks, iced drinks, tea, and soda. Bruegger's operates 164 restaurants in 21 U.S. states.

== Corporate history ==
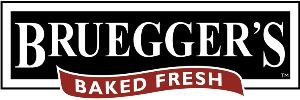
Original logo

Bruegger's was founded in 1983 by Nordahl Brue and Mike Dressell, with the first store opening in Troy, New York.

In June 1996, the business was bought by Quality Dining, a franchisee, for $142 million in stock, with the founders joining the Quality Dining board. The merge was not a comfortable one. Within a short period Brue and Dressell became concerned with the ongoing operations and scope for growth, leading to a critical U.S. Securities and Exchange Commission (SEC) filing alleging a lack of strategic direction. Holding a combined 26% stake, Brue and Dressell called for reorganization of Quality Dining, resulting in Bruegger's being resold to Brue and Dressel in October 1997 for $45 million. Brue has since referred to the original sale as part of his "biggest mistake".

In May 2003, James J. Greco and Sun Capital Partners acquired the company from the founders.

In 2018, approximately 190 Bruegger's locations operated in 16 U.S. states and the District of Columbia. The company is headquartered in Burlington, Vermont. Bruegger's had $200 million in revenue in 2008.

In November 2009, Bruegger's purchased the retail operations of Timothy's World Coffee, mmmuffins, and Michel's Baguette through a wholly owned subsidiary called ThreeCaf Brands Canada, Inc. Bruegger's intends to continue operations of all three brands. The three brands combined operated approximately 140 locations.

In March 2011, Groupe Le Duff of France bought out Bruegger's. Le Duff already had a U.S. presence with its La Madeleine brand, which has 60 units domestically. Le Duff plans to "Francify" some Bruegger's locations, and will combine other units with Brioche Dorée outlets. The first European Bruegger's opened in Rennes in 2013, and Paris and Toulouse in 201).

In December 2011, James J. Greco announced he would be stepping down as CEO at the end of the year to pursue other opportunities.

In August 2017, Caribou and its privately held owner JAB Holdings bought the bagel chain. The terms of the deal, which closed at the end of September, were not disclosed. In December 2017 Bruegger's closed 30 locations, primarily in Eastern markets.

In April 2018, Threecaf Brands sold Timothy's World Coffee and mmmuffins to Canadian company MTY Food Group for $1.7 million, of which $1.2 million was in cash, $0.2 million in assumed liabilities, and $0.3 million as a holdback.

=== Subsidiaries ===
==== Michel's Bakery Café ====
Michel's Bakery Café
- Type: Private
- Industry: Restaurants
- Founded: 1980
- Headquarters: Toronto
- Key people: Michael Bregman, Founder
- Products: Breads; Pastries; Quiches; Salads
- Website: michelsbakerycafe.com

Michel's Bakery Café, formerly named Michel's Baguettes, is a Canadian bakery-café founded in 1980, operating restaurants throughout Canada. The company is one of the largest bakery-café chains in Canada and operates both corporate and franchise locations. The company was purchased by Timothy's Coffees of the World Inc. in 2001. Timothy's continued to operate the Michel's Bakery Café stores under their original trade name, Michel's Baguette.

In November 2009, Michel's Baguette was sold to Bruegger's Enterprises, Inc. along with Timothy's Coffee and mmmuffins through a wholly owned subsidiary called ThreeCaf Brands Canada Inc. Bruegger's has continued to operate these chains. The company has since revitalized its operations, revamped its aesthetics and changed its name to Michel's Bakery Café.

== World record ==
On August 27, 2004, Bruegger's created the world's largest bagel, which currently holds the Guinness World Record. The bagel weighed 868 pounds (394 kg) and required 1,100 pounds (500 kg) of dough, 900 US gallons (3,400 L; 750 imp gal) of water, and 10 hours of baking. It was cooked at the New York State Fair and was sliced and served to onlookers, who were encouraged to make donations to benefit local food banks.

== See also ==
- Fast casual restaurant
- List of bakery cafés
