= Roselle Catholic High School =

Catholic high school in Union County, New Jersey, US

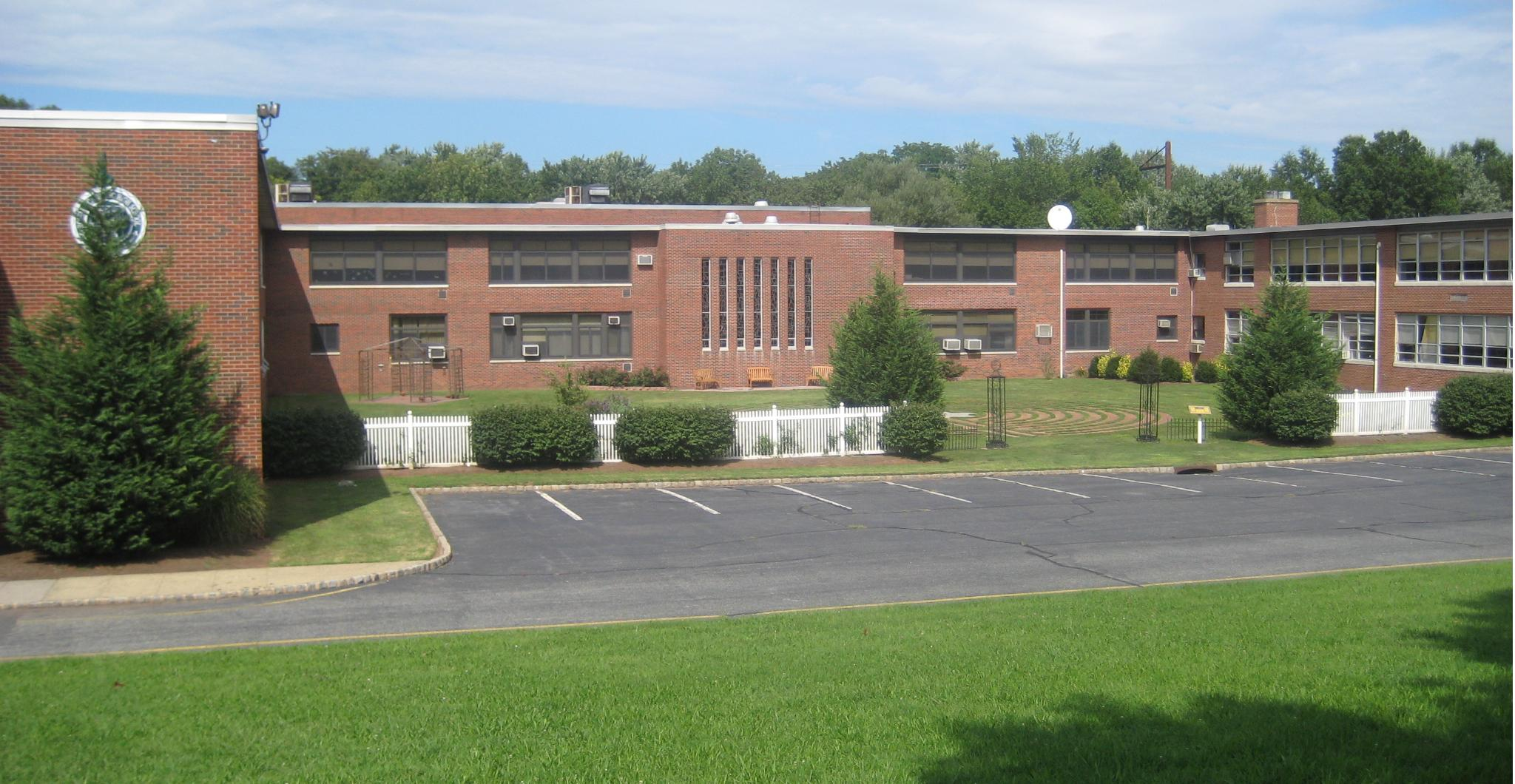

Location
- 350 Raritan Road; Roselle, (Union County), New Jersey 07203; United States; 40°38′55″N 74°15′54″W

Information
- Type: Private, Coeducational
- Religious affiliations: Roman Catholic, Marist Brothers
- Established: 1959
- Status: Open
- School district: Archdiocese of Newark
- NCES School ID: 00863395
- Chairperson: Matt Fallon '03
- Principal: Thomas Berrios
- Faculty: 28 FTEs
- Grades: 9–12
- Enrollment: 300
- Student to teacher ratio: 12.6:1
- Colors: Green; Gold and white
- Athletics conference: Union County Interscholastic Athletic Conference
- Mascot: Lion
- Team name: Lions
- Accreditation: Middle States Association of Colleges and Schools
- Publication: Vox Leonis (literary magazine)
- Yearbook: Lions' Lair
- Tuition: $14,500
- Website: www.rosellecatholic.org

Roselle Catholic High School is a coeducational, Roman Catholic high school, located on a 15-acre (6.1 ha) campus in Roselle, in Union County, in the U.S. state of New Jersey. The school, established in 1959, operates under the supervision of the Roman Catholic Archdiocese of Newark and the Marist Brothers. The school is accredited by the Middle States Association of Colleges and Schools through July 2027.

As of the 2017–18 school year, the school had an enrollment of 354 students and 28 classroom teachers (on an FTE basis), for a student–teacher ratio of 12.6:1. The school's student body was 34.7% (123) Black, 24.9% (88) White, 17.8% (63) Hispanic, 12.7% (45) Asian and 9.9% (35) two or more races.

Morses Creek flows through the campus.

== Athletics ==
The Roselle Catholic High School Lions compete in the Union County Interscholastic Athletic Conference, which includes public and private high schools in Union County and operates under the supervision of the New Jersey State Interscholastic Athletic Association (NJSIAA) and was established as part of a reorganization of sports leagues in Northern New Jersey. Prior to the NJSIAA's 2009 realignment, the school had participated in the Mountain Valley Conference, which included public and private high schools in Essex County, Somerset County and Union County. With 255 students in grades 10–12, the school was classified by the NJSIAA for the 2019–20 school year as Non-Public B for most athletic competition purposes, which included schools with an enrollment of 37 to 366 students in that grade range (equivalent to Group II for public schools).

The boys track team won the indoor track Non-Public state championship in 1965, 1967 and 1969, and won the Non-Public B title in 2011. The girls team won the Group II title in 2004 (as co-champion) and the Non-Public B title in 2009.

The boys track team won the Non-Public indoor relay championships in 1967–1969, 1973 and 1974. The program's five state titles are tied for ninth-most in the state.

The boys baseball team won the Non-Public A North state championship in 1967 and 1968, and won the Non-Public A state title in 1978 vs. Camden Catholic High School. The 1978 team won the Parochial A state title with a 3–1 win against Camden Catholic in the championship game played at Mercer County Park.

The boys track team won the Non-Public Group A spring / outdoor track state championship in 1967 and 1973.

The boys cross country running team won the Non-Public Group A state championship in 1968 and 1969, and won the Non-Public B title 2004 and 2008.

The boys bowling team won the Group I state championship in 2008 and 2009.

The girls volleyball team won the Non-Public state championship in 2006, defeating runner-up Immaculate Heart Academy in the final match of the tournament.

The boys' basketball team won the Non-Public B state championships in 2013-2015 (defeating St. Anthony High School in the finals each of the three years) and 2018 (vs. Ranney School). The team won their third consecutive Non-Public B title in 2015 with a 56–52 win against St. Anthony in the championship game. The team won the 2018 Non-Public B title with a 63–61 win against Ranney School on a basket scored with just over six seconds remaining in the championship game. The team came into the 2013 Tournament of Champions as the top seed and finished the season 25-5 after winning the program's first ToC title with a 78–54 win against fifth-seeded Newark Tech High School in the semifinals and 65–49 against number-two seed St. Joseph High School of Metuchen in the championship game. The 2015 team won the school's second ToC title with a 103–34 win against Paulsboro High School in the semifinals and 57–45 against Pope John XXIII Regional High School in the finals, behind 27 points by Isaiah Briscoe. The team came into the 2018 ToC as the top seed and won the program's third title with a 75–62 win against Nottingham High School in the semifinals and a 61–54 win against Don Bosco Preparatory High School in the finals at the CURE Insurance Arena in Trenton, despite a career-high 33 points from Don Bosco's Ron Harper Jr.

== Labyrinth ==
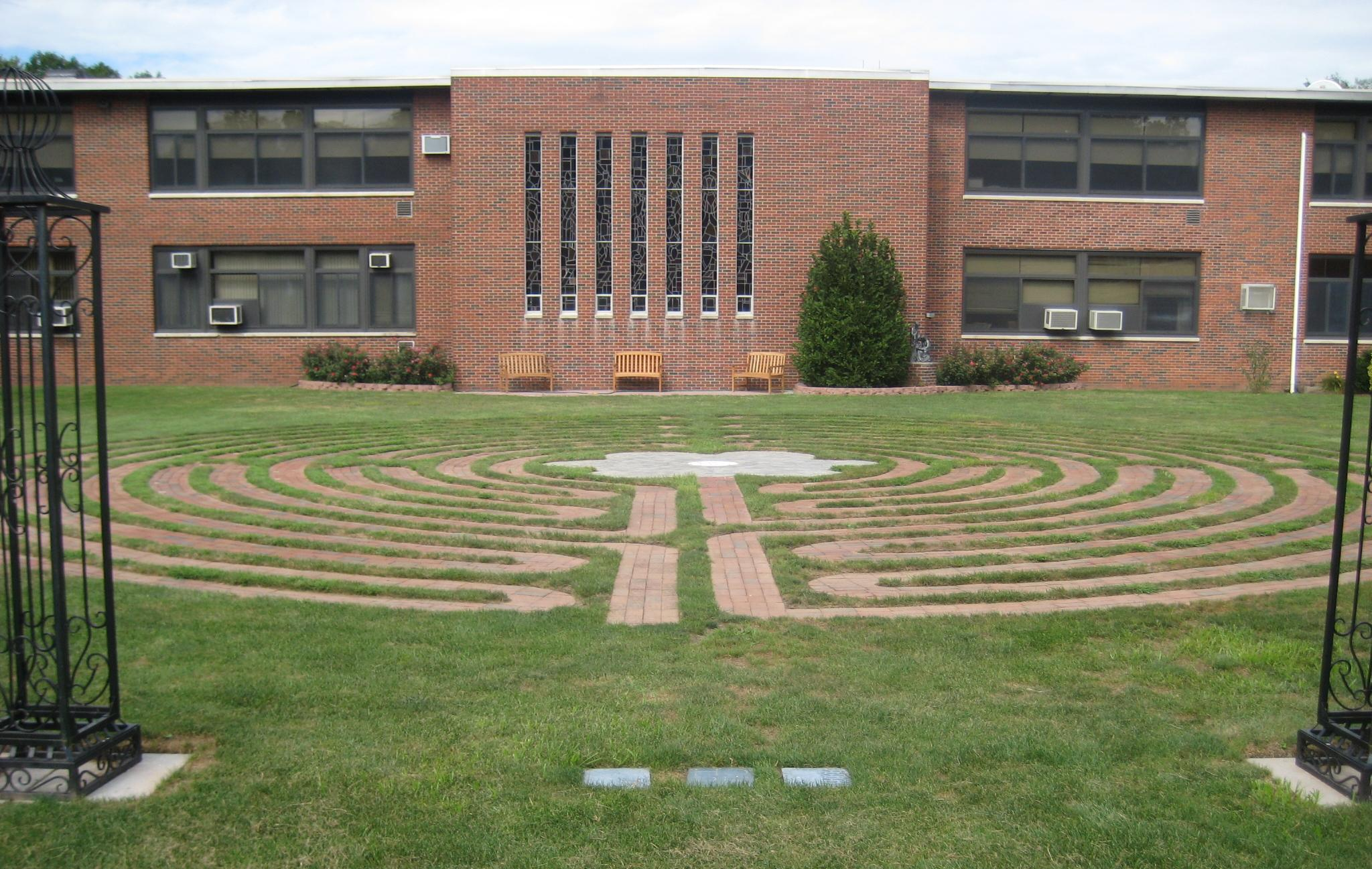
RCHS Labyrinth in the school's courtyard

At the center of the school's courtyard is a spiraling brick walkway called the Roselle Catholic High School Labyrinth. The labyrinth is made of 8,000 bricks and was constructed in the summer of 2008 to commemorate Roselle Catholic's 50th anniversary as a school.

== Notable alumni ==
- Aaron Bradshaw (born 2003; transferred), basketball player.
- Isaiah Briscoe (born 1996; class of 2015), basketball player for the Kentucky Wildcats men's basketball and Orlando Magic.
- Tom Coyne (1954-2017), mastering engineer.
- Daniel Hugh Kelly (born 1952; class of 1970), actor and star of Hardcastle and McCormick television series.
- Wan J. Kim (born 1968; class of 1986), former Assistant Attorney General for the United States Department of Justice Civil Rights Division.
- Louis King (born 1999; transferred), college basketball player for the Oregon Ducks, who transferred after his freshman year.
- Mackenzie Mgbako (born 2004; class of 2023), small forward who has committed to play for the Indiana Hoosiers
- Bill Murphy (born 1989; class of 2007), professional baseball pitching coach for the Pittsburgh Pirates
- Clifford Omoruyi (born 2001; class of 2020), basketball player for the Rutgers Scarlet Knights and the Nigeria national team
- Marissa Paternoster (born 1986), artist, singer, songwriter and musician.
- John Pelesko (born 1968; class of 1986), mathematician.
- Nate Pierre-Louis (born 1998; class of 2017), basketball player
- Naz Reid (born 1999; class of 2018), center for the Charlotte Hornets of the NBA.
- Malachi Richardson (born 1996; transferred), NBA basketball player for the Sacramento Kings.
- Tyler Roberson (born 1994; class of 2013), professional basketball player for the Agua Caliente Clippers of the NBA G League.
- Karl Schellscheidt (born 1968; class of 1986), soccer player, educator and entrepreneur.
- Chris Silva (born 1996; class of 2015), NBA player (previously), now player in the Israeli Basketball Premier League.
- Kurt Sutter (class of 1982), writer, producer, actor, director and creator of Sons of Anarchy television series.
- Dick Sweeney (class of 1966), co-founder of Keurig, developer of the K-Cup single coffee brewing system.
- Jameel Warney (born 1994; class of 2012), basketball player who played in the NBA for the Dallas Mavericks.
- Kahlil Whitney (born 2001; class of 2019), basketball player
