= Timothy's World Coffee =

Canadian coffee roasting company and coffeeshop chain

Timothy's Coffees of the World Inc.

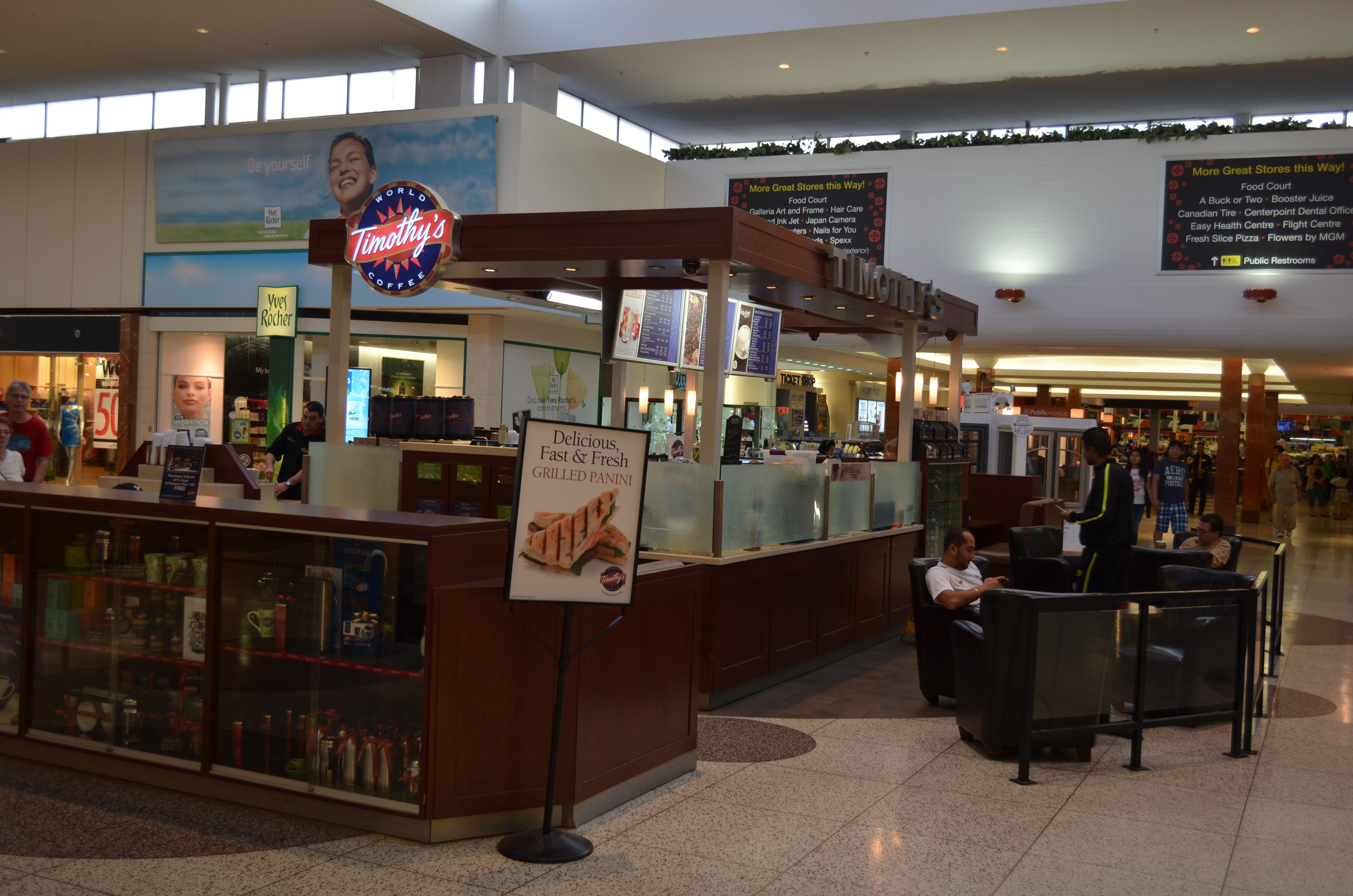
- Timothy's World Coffee, Centerpoint Mall
- Type: Subsidiary
- Industry: Restaurant
- Founded: 1975; 51 years ago
- Headquarters: Toronto, Ontario
- Key people: Timothy Snelgrove, Founder
- Products: Coffee; Doughnuts; Bagels; Muffins
- Parent: MTY Food Group
- Website: timothyscafes.com

Timothy's World Coffee (a.k.a. Timothy's) is a large Canadian coffee roasting company and chain of coffeeshops.

== Origin and background ==
Timothy's was founded in 1975 as a retailer of premium roasted coffee beans by Timothy Snelgrove and his wife Teresa Snelgrove. The company was originated as a business-school project Snelgrove undertook while studying at the University of Western Ontario. As the company expanded, it evolved its retail offering to include brewed coffee. The first Timothy's was opened in a mall in London, Ontario.

Timothy's was purchased by Ian and Becky McKinnon in 1986 who further expanded retail locations and created a wholesale coffee division. Timothy's also became a roaster partner of Keurig and began producing single serve K-Cups for use in Keurig's line of single serve brewers.

In 2008, Timothy's became an affiliated portfolio company of Sun Capital Partners.

On November 13, 2009, it was announced that Green Mountain Coffee Roasters Inc. would acquire Timothy's wholesale business, while Bruegger's Enterprises, Inc. would purchase and continue to operate the retail business. Bruegger's would also acquire Timothy's partner restaurants, Mmmuffins and Michel's Baguette, through a wholly owned subsidiary called ThreeCaf Brands Canada Inc.

Timothy's produces its own coffee beans, roasting and producing multiple formats of coffee in its own plant. For this reason, the company offers a freshness guarantee and other supporting company policies. Since 2015 the Toronto roasting plant was closed and consolidated into the Van Houtte roasting plant in Quebec.

== Expansion into the United States ==
In the mid-1990s, Timothy's expanded into the United States, concentrating in New York City. Other stores were located in Boston, Washington, D.C., and Philadelphia. At one point, it was New York City's second-largest coffeehouse chain, after Starbucks. After the September 11 attacks in 2001, the company closed its US operations and the company re-focused on the Canadian market and wholesale business operation.

== Expansion into South Korea ==
Timothy's opened its first overseas store in Seoul, Republic of Korea (South Korea) on May 19, 2007.

== Current business ==
Timothy's purchased the existing stores in Canada and later acquired the Mmmuffins and Michel's Baguette retail businesses. Today, there remain just handful of stores under the Timothy's name. As of October 2026 the only locations listed as open on Google Maps includes ones in Anjou, Quebec, and in Charlottetown PEI. The Charlottetown location is the only one to have a working website, and the corporate site for Timothy's is no longer working. Timothy's also operates a wholesale coffee business, supplies office coffee service companies, packages coffee in K-Cups for Keurig home and office brewers, and has a distribution program in large chain hotels, grocery stores, sports clubs and similar venues.

In February 2009, it named a brand of coffee the "Presidential No. 44" blend to celebrate a visit to Canada by U.S. President Barack Obama.

== Bruegger's/Green Mountain acquisition ==
On November 13, 2009 Green Mountain Coffee Roasters acquired Timothy's wholesale business from Sun Capital Partners, Inc. for a cash purchase price of approximately $157 million, in U.S. dollars, subject to adjustment. Concurrently, Bruegger's Enterprises, Inc. acquired Timothy's retail operations for an undisclosed sum.

Green Mountain acquired the Timothy's World Coffee wholesale business, but not their retail operations. Timothy's wholesale business will be maintained as a Canadian subsidiary, with operations integrated into Green Mountain's Specialty Coffee Business Unit.

Bruegger's Enterprises, Inc., through a wholly owned subsidiary called ThreeCaf Brands Canada Inc., assumed control of Timothy's three restaurant brands: Timothy's World Coffee, Mmmuffins and Michel's Baguette. Bruegger's intends to continue operations of all three brands.

== MTY Food Group acquisition ==
In 2018, MTY Food Group acquired Timothy's World Coffee and Mmmuffins retail operations from Le Duff America.

== See also ==
- List of coffeehouse chains
