= Tijuana Flats =

American restaurant chain

Coordinates: 28.6338°N 81.3925°W

Tijuana Flats Tex-Mex
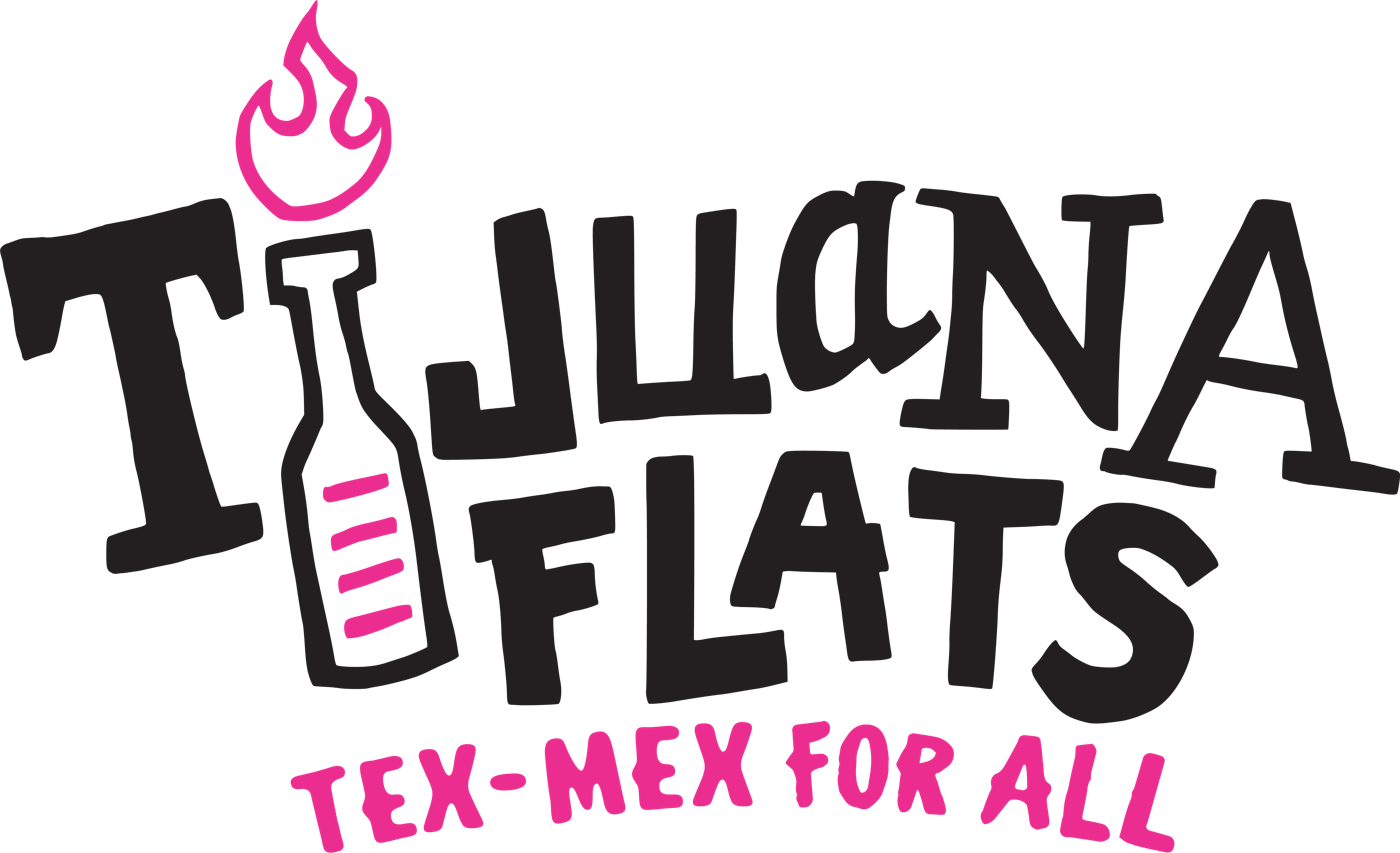
- Type: Private
- Industry: Restaurants
- Founded: 1995; 31 years ago in Winter Park, Florida
- Founder: Brian Wheeler
- Headquarters: Maitland, Florida, U.S.
- Number of locations: 91
- Area served: Florida, Alabama, Tennessee, North Carolina, Kentucky
- Key people: James J. Greco CEO
- Number of employees: 3,000 (2016)
- Website: tijuanaflats.com

Tijuana Flats Tex-Mex is a privately held American restaurant chain serving Tex-Mex cuisine. It has over 91 locations (65 company owned and 26 franchised) throughout Florida, Alabama, Tennessee, North Carolina and Kentucky.

The restaurant was founded in Winter Park, Florida, in 1995 by University of Central Florida graduate Brian Wheeler with US$20,000 in loans. The company had 18 locations before expanding out-of-state in 2004.

== History ==
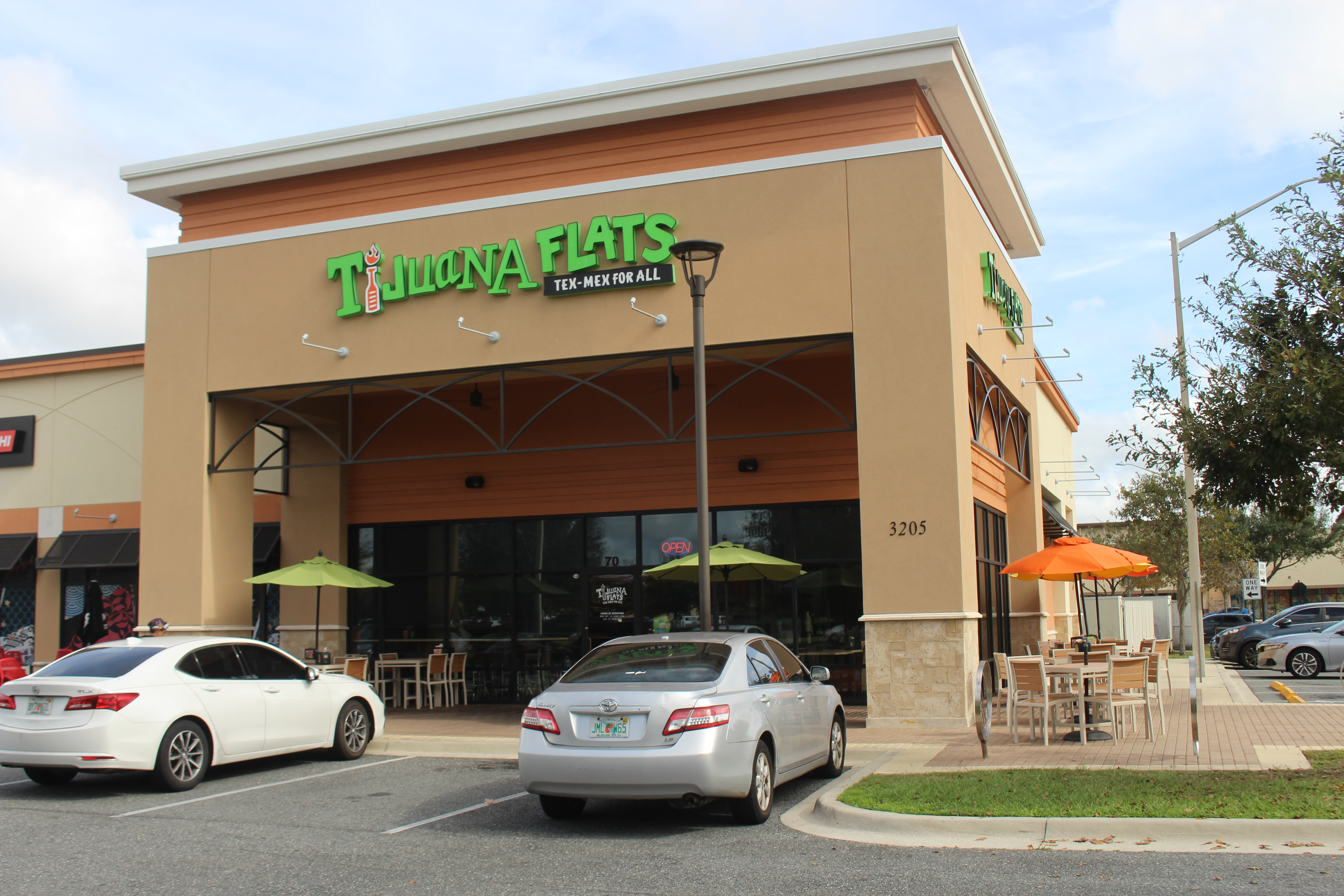
Tijuana Flats in Gainesville, Florida

Tijuana Flats was started in Winter Park, Florida. It was modeled after Burrito Brothers, a Mexican restaurant in Gainesville, Florida, and funded with $20,000 in borrowed money from Wheeler's family. Students from Wheeler's former college made up some of the restaurant's early customers.

After the third location was opened, a semi-retired restaurant executive, Camp Fitch, was invited to Tijuana Flats by his golf partner. In 1999, Fitch invested in the company and was appointed its CEO to expand the company. When the fourth location opened, the founder's dad, Chester Wheeler, was reimbursed for his $20,000 loan used to start the company and joined as the CFO.

Tijuana Flats had six locations by 2001, which grew to 18 locations in 2004 and 65 by 2009. In 2005, Tijuana Flats built its training center for restaurant managers in Winter Park. Today, the restaurant support and training center is located at the Tijuana Flats HQ in Maitland, Florida. In 2007, Tijuana Flats shifted from a franchise model to corporate-owned stores. That same year, Tijuana Flats created its non-profit arm, the Just in Queso Foundation. The Foundation donated $46,000 to remodel the home of a handicapped war veteran and started donating profits from the Just in Queso hot sauce to the Breast Cancer Research Foundation.

In late 2015, the company was sold to AUA Private Equity firm. Brian Wright was named CEO of the company in 2019. In 2021, the company announced that it would be bringing back its franchising program, which was previously suspended in 2007. In October 2022, Joseph D. Christina was named as the company's new CEO.

On 19 April 2024, Tijuana Flats filed for Chapter 11 bankruptcy, closing 11 restaurants, and was acquired by Flatheads, LLC the same day. In June 2024, James J. Greco was named as the company's new CEO. Tijuana Flats exited bankruptcy in January 2025, with plans to refresh its menu and return to expanding its footprint.

On November 6, 2025, the company announced it had been acquired by &pizza, forming a new restaurant group called Latitude Food Group.

== Restaurant design ==
Tijuana Flats is widely known for the unique appearance of their restaurants. The main feature of each location is its hand-painted wall mural. The first mural was painted in 1995 by artist Christopher Galipeau at the original location in Winter Park, Florida. Christopher painted eight murals for the company before he died of cancer in 2008. His artwork features a series of characters, most notably a gigantic Green "God." This character was featured in many of his murals. After his death, multiple artists tried to replicate his style of work at newer Tijuana Flats locations.

The company is also known for having a "wall of fame" in each location. Up until 2016, every restaurant featured a wall covered with photos and autographs of celebrities who have visited the establishment. All restaurants built after 2016 no longer feature the iconic wall.

=== Design changes ===
The chain has gone through quite a few different design changes over the years. The original legacy design lasted from 1995 until 2005. These locations looked as if they were all small, local, taco shops. Design elements included celebrity photos scattered across the walls, shelves filled with hot sauces, colorful string lights, and 3D "Hot Bar" signs. In 2008 the company decided it wanted to go for a more "mature" look. Newer restaurants featured wall graffiti, purple and red paint, and darker lights. The celebrity wall of fame was no longer scattered, but rather the photos were neatly lined across the walls in rows. The most notable change came during the "Amped Up" look in 2016. The celebrity "wall of fame" was removed, and the murals were painted on either wood or concrete walls. The restaurants took on a more industrial look. The location in Cary, North Carolina, was updated in 2016 to reflect the "amped up" look.

In 2020 the company announced the "High-Tech Prototype" design. The first location to open with it was in Noblesville, Indiana. The new design features bright lighting, custom vinyl-printed tables, digital menu boards, decal/graphic covered walls, and a local inspired mural. This design took a drastic turn away from the previous industrial look, as all of the restaurants are covered with bright blue and yellow paint. Gone are the sci-fi wall murals, the new murals depict comical lizards in a local setting. Examples include lizards paddling down the Wekiva River at the Hunt Club location, a lizard fishing at the Ocoee location, and lizards hanging out in a park at the Winter Park location. The murals were moved from the dining room side of the restaurant to the queue side of the restaurant.

| Years | Restaurant Design | Notable Features | Current Status |
|---|---|---|---|
| 1995–2008 | Legacy Store Design | Sci-Fi wall mural, hot sauce shelves, yellow walls, scattered celebrity autographs. | Very few locations remain with this design. Locations include Baymeadows, Ortega Village, Metrowest. |
| 2008–2015 | "Mature" Store Design | Darker content murals, straight wall of celebrity autographs, red and purple walls. | The most common store design, majority of the restaurants feature this. |
| 2015–2020 | "Amped Up" Store Design | Removed celebrity autographs, industrial look, sci-fi murals return. | Roughly 10 stores feature this design, including Bloomingdale, Nocatee, and Millennia. |
| 2020–present | "High-Tech Prototype" Store Design | Digital menu boards, local "lizard" murals, blue and yellow walls. | All new stores feature this design. All previous stores are being remodeled to match this design. |

==== Remodeling ====
In 2021, the company began remodeling its locations to match the new "High-Tech Prototype" store design. The first location to be remodeled was Tijuana Flats #4, located on Aloma Ave in Winter Park, Florida. The location previously featured the legacy look and later the "mature" store design. The remodel included a new mural, featuring lizards playing in a park. The mural sparked outcry by Tijuana Flats fans on Facebook, as it looked too tame and childish. The company modified the mural to better fit the Tijuana Flats theme. This marked the first location to feature three different murals over the years. In 2022, Tijuana Flats #2 in Hunt Club, Florida, was remodeled. The remodel involved removing the 2nd ever Tijuana Flats wall mural, which was painted by artist Christopher Galipeau in the mid 90's. The mural was not only the second painting created for the company, but it was also the first full-wall mural.

== Menu ==
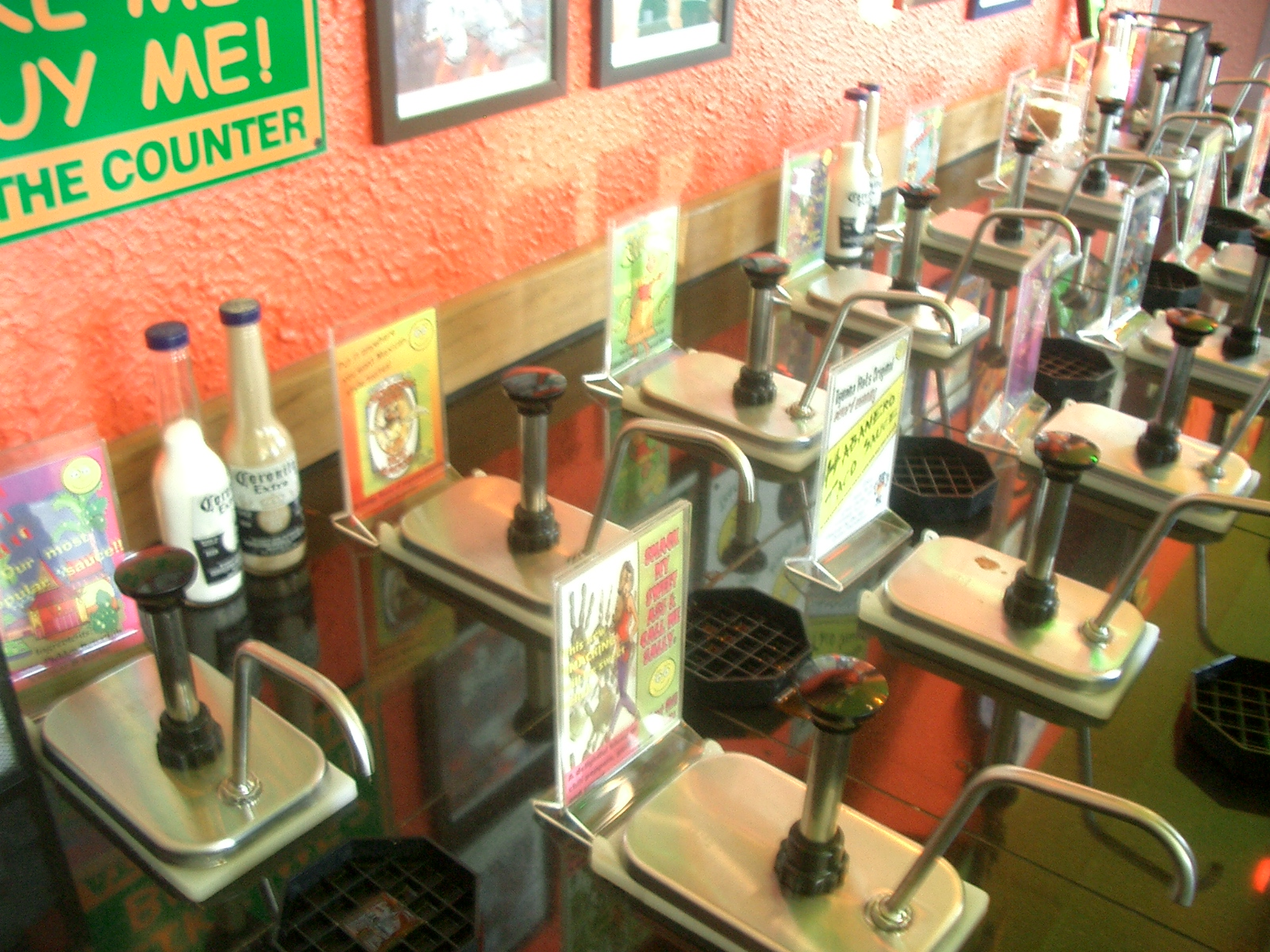
A hot sauce bar from Tijuana Flats

Tijuana Flats’ entrées include burritos, burrito bowls, chimichangas, dos tacos, flautas, fresh salads, nachos, quesadillas,Guests have their choice of tortilla with flour as well as hard corn with tacos. All items except for the flat outrageous items come with their choice of toppings of lettuce, tomatoes, onions, sour cream, and jalapeños as well as fillings including classic shredded and blackened chicken, beef, steak, shrimp, refried and black beans. There are also the options to make the entrées wet with queso, megajuana with double meat and a meal with queso, salsa, guac and a drink.

Guests may also order a starter of chips with fresh salsa, queso, guacamole, or a trio of all three; a side of fresh salsa, pico de gallo, queso, guac, rice, or beans; and a dessert of churro fries or cookie dough flautas. Burrito, and taco meal kits are also available

== See also ==
- List of Tex-Mex restaurants
