= Mmmuffins =

Canadian restaurant chain

mmmuffins Canada Corporation (MCC)

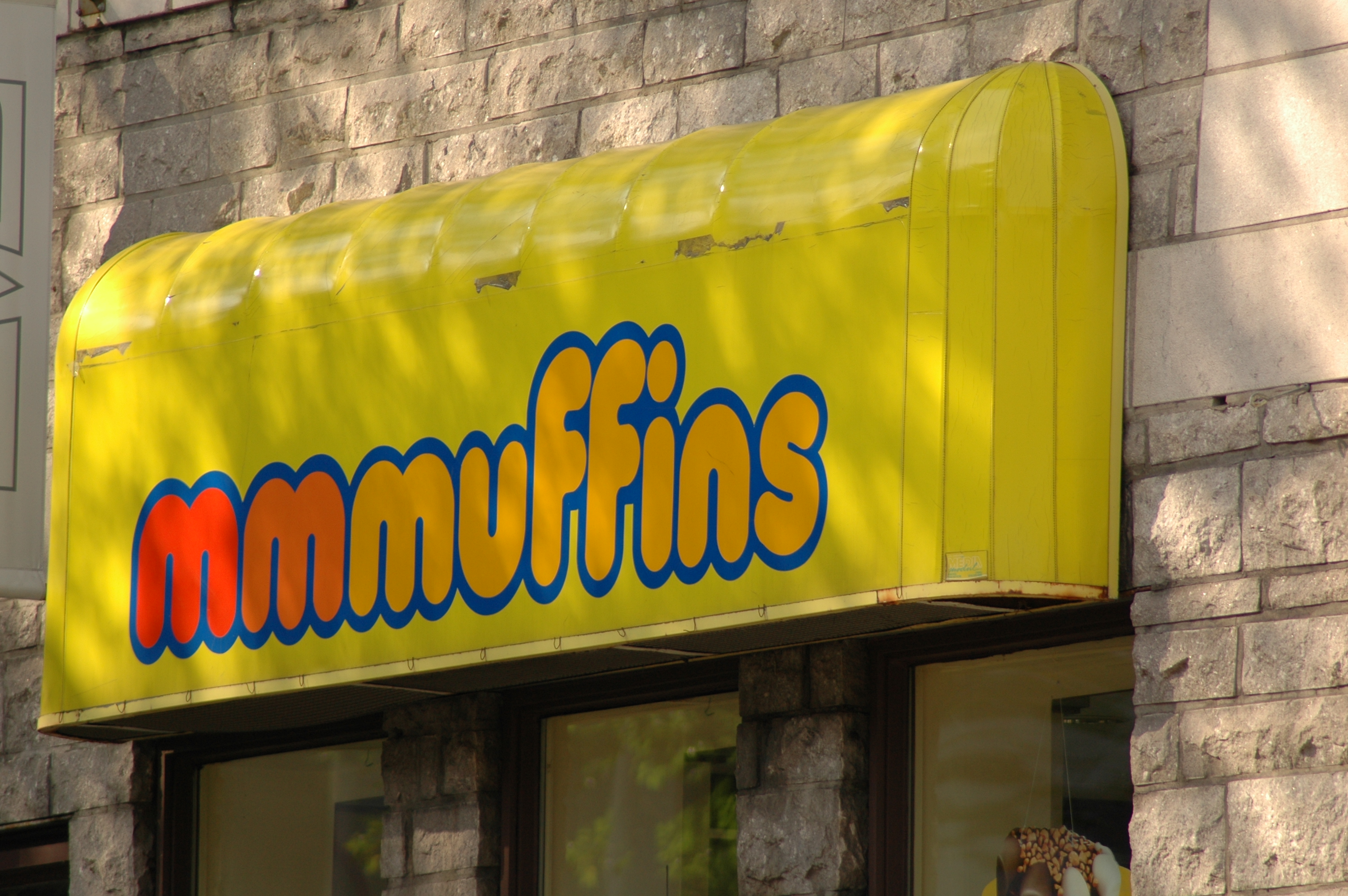
- Storefront signage at a mmmuffins shop in Montreal
- Type: Subsidiary
- Industry: Restaurants
- Founded: 1979; 47 years ago
- Number of locations: 1 café
- Key people: Michael Bregman, Founder
- Products: Coffee; Bagels; Muffins
- Parent: MTY Food Group

Marvellous Mmmuffins, also known as mmmuffins, was a Canadian restaurant chain that sold coffee and muffins. It was established in 1979 and granted its first franchise in 1980.

Its popularity peaked in the 1980s and 1990s, when most shopping malls in Canada had a Marvellous Mmmuffin shop. By 2019, the chain had only two stores, one in the Scotia Plaza food court in Toronto and the other in the Montreal suburb of Côte-Saint-Luc. The Toronto location was reported to have closed in 2020. In 2022, the grocery chain Country Style, sold a selection of the muffins. The Montreal shopping mall location was confirmed to be re-branded as "Muffin Plus" as of October 2024, which means there are now zero locations existing in Canada.

== Background ==
In 1957, Lou Bregman opened a Bagel King on Eglinton Avenue in Toronto, Ontario, after gaining experience working with his father making bagels. In the 1960s, he opened another Bagel King store at Yorkdale Mall; on weekends, his son Michael served customers at the counter. By the 1970s, Loblaws sold Bagel King bagels, and in 1977 the company's president Dave Nichol hired Michael, who had completed a Master of Business Administration (MBA) at Harvard University, as his assistant.

Bregman was tasked with improving the company's bakery department, and eventually found a bakery in Hamilton that made unusually large muffins, typically triple the size of muffins of the time and including different grains and other ingredients. A test run in 1979 at two Loblaws locations proved successful; by the end of the week, the order was increased 16-fold. This success led Bregman to consider creating an independent muffin shop. During the subsequent six months, he developed the concept for this shop and a bakery called Michel's Baguette.

== History ==
Bregman and his wife Barbara developed new muffin recipes. At the same time, his father modified standard muffin recipes, resulting in five basic recipes: bran, carrot, chocolate fudge, cornbread, and a standard white base.

The first store was opened at the Toronto Eaton Centre in December 1979, and the first franchise store was established on Eglinton Avenue in 1980. With a Canadian mall construction boom in the early 1980s, Bregman acquired leases in many of them, establishing a national chain that at its peak had about 130 stores. mmmuffins was distinctive for displaying its baking carts to customers to verify their product's freshness, an "ahead of the curve" retail strategy".

In 1988, Bregman bought Second Cup, seeing the emerging trend in espresso and specialty coffee. He sold mmmuffins and Michel's Baguette in the early 1990s. The company was purchased by Timothy's World Coffee in 2002, which continued to operate the mmmuffins stores with their original trade name. On November 13, 2009, mmmuffins was sold to Bruegger's Enterprises, Inc. along with Timothy's Coffee and Michel's Baguette through a wholly owned subsidiary called ThreeCaf Brands Canada Inc. Bruegger's continued operations of these chains.

In April 2018, Groupe Le Duff subsidiary Threecaf Brands sold Timothy's World Coffee and mmmuffins to Canadian company MTY Food Group of Richmond Hill, Ontario, for $1.7 million, of which $1.2 million was in cash, $0.2 million in assumed liabilities, and $0.3 million as a holdback. This included 30 Timothy's franchises in Canada and two in the United States, seven corporate Timothy's locations in Canada, and four mmmuffins stores.

Chief operating officer of the MTY Food Group quick service restaurant division Jason Brading has stated that once the leases on the two remaining stores expire, the stores will be converted to other brands, but that the mmmuffins products may be incorporated into other cafe properties owned by MTY.

== See also ==
- List of bakery cafés
- Second Cup
