= Country Pure Foods =

American food manufacturer

- Type: Subsidiary
- Founded: 1995
- Headquarters: Akron, Ohio, United States of America
- Key people: Tony Muscato (President, CEO)
- Products: Fruit drinks, juices, nectars, and concentrates.
- Owner: Blue Point Capital Partners, LLC
- Website: www.countrypure.com

Country Pure Foods is an American manufacturer of fruit drinks, juices, and plant-based beverages for retail food purveyors and foodservice operators. It also provides food manufacturers with fruit ingredients. The company's brand names include Ardmore Farms, SideKicks, VBlends, Fun!, VitaMost, and Glacier Valley. Country Pure Foods is owned by Blue Point Capital Partners, LLC, a private equity investor based in Cleveland, Ohio.

Country Pure is headquartered in Akron, Ohio and operates juice plants in Ellington, Connecticut, Deland, Florida, Howey-in-the-Hills, Florida, Houston, Texas, and Akron, Ohio.

== History ==
Country Pure Foods was created in 1995 through a merger of Natural Country Farms and Ohio Pure Foods. Country Pure Foods remains to this day a privately held corporation. In 2003, the Ellington plant was the cause of an ammonia leak which led to the company being fined by the Environmental Protection Agency for improper reporting of the incident.

The company was owned by private equity investors from 1995 to 2014. In 2014, it was acquired by a joint venture between Sapporo Holdings, a major Japanese beverage maker, and Toyota Tsusho, a Japanese trading company better known for operating the automaker of the same name.

== Key management ==
- President and Chief Executive Officer: Tony Muscato
- Chief Financial Officer: Dave Kantor

== Predecessors ==
=== Natural Country Farms ===
Natural Country Farms was founded in 1985. Prior to merging in the formation of Country Pure Foods, the company was run by Ben Moser and James J. Greco from 1990 to 1995.

=== Ohio Pure Foods ===
Ohio Pure Foods was founded in 1993. Prior to merging in the formation of Country Pure Foods in 1995, the company was run by Dave Mikolajczyk.
