= Mimi's Cafe =

American restaurant chain

Mimi's Bistro + Bakery
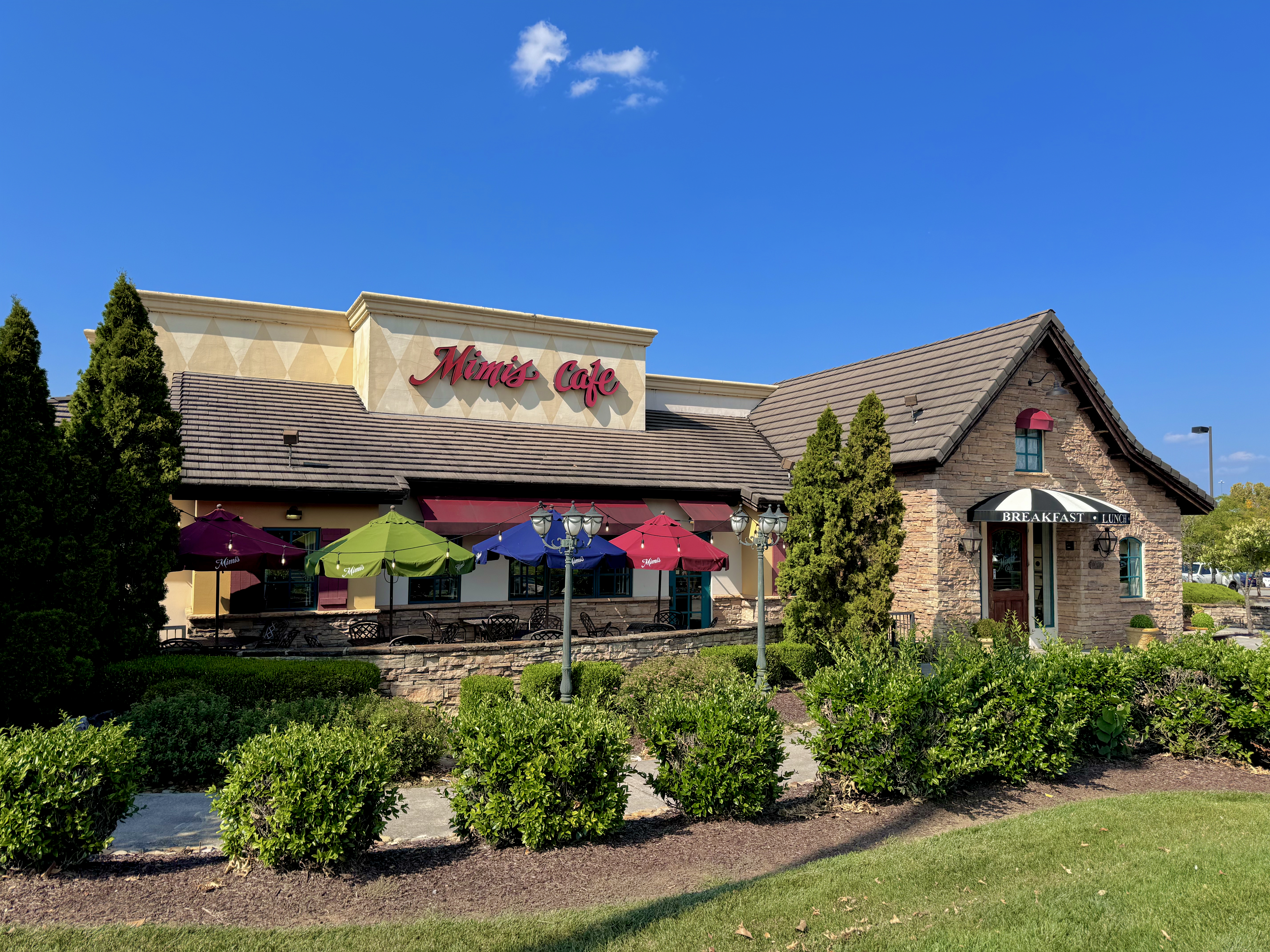
- Mimi's Café in Knoxville, Tennessee
- Formerly: Mimi's Café
- Industry: restaurant
- Headquarters: Dallas, Texas (current HQ); Tustin, California (former HQ)
- Key people: Arthur J. Simms; Thomas Simms; Brian Taylor; Paul Kurz
- Products: French and American food
- Parent: LeDuff America
- Website: www.mimiscafe.com

Mimi's Bistro + Bakery (formerly Mimi's Café) is an American restaurant chain. As of April 2024, the company operates 44 locations in Arizona, California, Colorado, Florida, Missouri, Nevada, New Mexico, North Carolina, Ohio, Tennessee, Texas, and Utah. Originally headquartered in Tustin, California, its headquarters moved to Dallas, Texas, in 2014 after 36 years in California. It serves French and American food, with French rustic decor and themes.

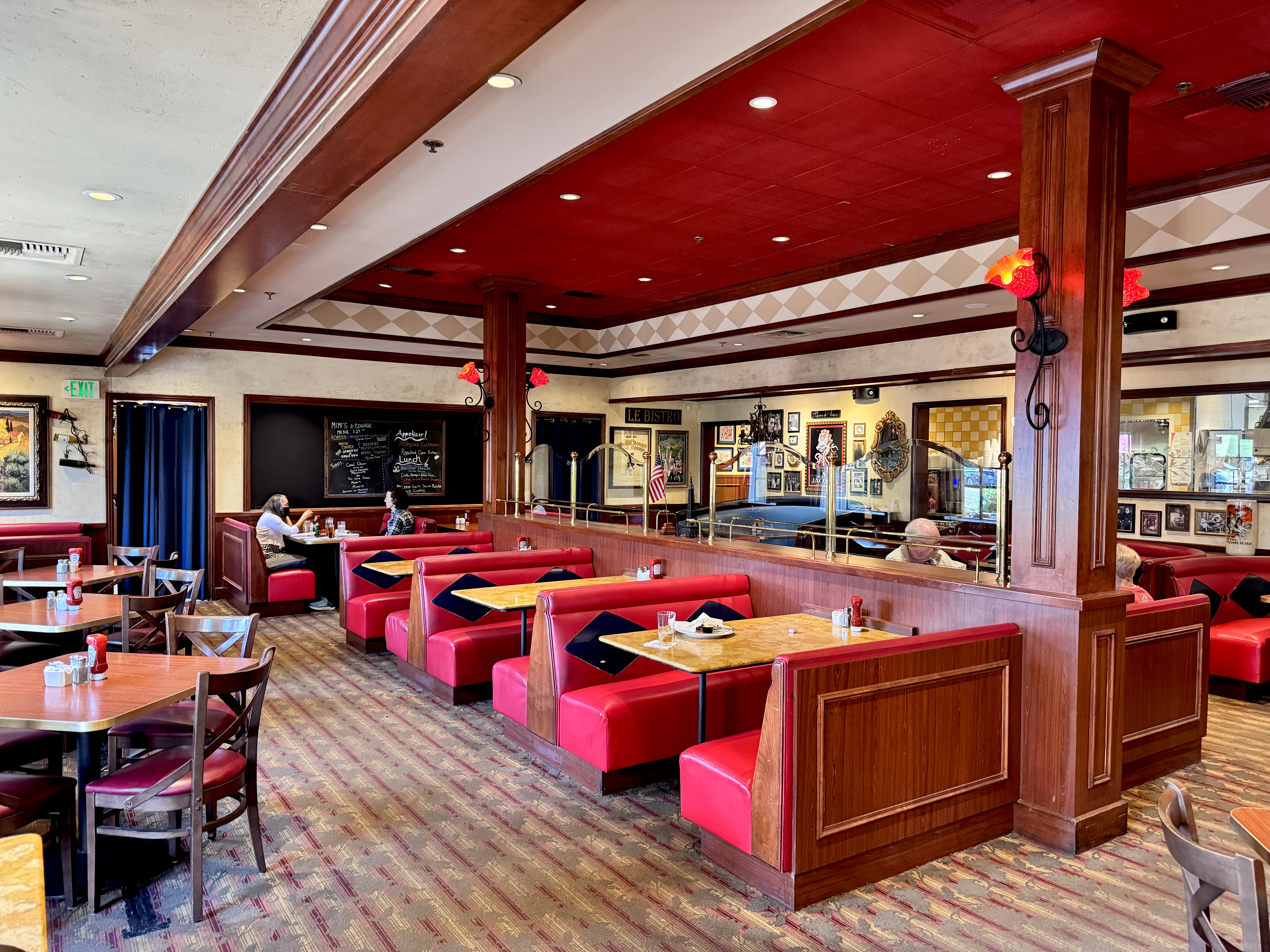
The interior of a Mimi's Café

Arthur J. Simms (who headed the commissary at MGM Studios in the 1950s), his son Thomas Simms, Brian Taylor, and Paul Kurz opened the first Mimi's Cafe in December 1978 in Anaheim, California. Bob Evans Farms, Inc., purchased the Mimi's Cafe restaurant chain (operating under SWH Corporation) in July 2004 for USD182 million. Mimi's Cafe was sold to the U.S. branch of Groupe Le Duff, which also owns the La Madeleine restaurants, in February 2013.

== History ==
Mimi's Bistro + Bakery is a wholly owned subsidiary of LeDuff America and was founded as Mimi's Cafe by American airman Arthur Simms, who was stationed in France during World War II. He named the restaurant after a French woman he met in a party after the liberation of the country. In July 2019, the company re-branded as Mimi's Bistro + Bakery in order to "reflect the company's desire to make Mimi's a destination restaurant, where diners can sit down for a leisurely experience over food and affordable wine."
