= Nordahl Brue =

American businessman

- Born: Nordahl Leo Brue; November 20, 1944 (age 80); Fiscus, Iowa, U.S.
- Education: Grinnell College (B.A.); Washington University School of Law (J.D.)
- Occupation(s): lawyer and entrepreneur
- Known for: Bruegger's Bagels

Nordahl Leo Brue (born November 20, 1944) is a lawyer and entrepreneur, best known as a founder of Bruegger's Bagels.

== Biography ==
Brue was educated at Grinnell College and Washington University in St. Louis. In 1983, Brue and Mike Dressell opened the first Bruegger's Bagels in Troy, New York. Bruegger's runs approximately 300 bakery-cafes in 24 states and the District of Columbia. Brue also serves as a member of the Board of Trustees of Grinnell College, chair of PKC Corporation and Franklin Foods, and as a member of the board of the Green Mountain Power Corporation. He is a member of the Vermont State Governor's Council of Economic Advisors.
