= Fieldbrook Farms =

American frozen dessert company

Fieldbrook Foods Corporation
- Trade name: Fieldbrook Farms
- Type: Private corporation
- Industry: Food
- Founded: 1914
- Founder: William J. Wells
- Headquarters: 1 Ice Cream Drive; Dunkirk, NY 14048; United States
- Key people: Robin Galloway, CEO
- Products: Ice cream, frozen desserts
- Services: Private label
- Parent: Wells Enterprises
- Website: fieldbrookfoods.com

Fieldbrook Farms is the trade name of Fieldbrook Foods Corporation, a $100 million manufacturer of private label ice cream and frozen desserts based out of Dunkirk, New York. In April 2019, Fieldbrook was acquired by Wells Enterprises, the third largest ice cream manufacturer in the United States.

Fieldbrook produces more than 1,500 varieties of packaged frozen desserts, ice cream and novelties. These products include, ice cream, frozen yogurt, sherbet & sorbet, sandwiches, IC/Fudge Bars, Ice Pops, juice & fruit bars, cones, cups and sorbet bars.

== History ==
=== Dunkirk Ice Cream ===
The company was founded by William J. Wells in 1914 under the name Dunkirk Ice Cream. It was family-owned and operated for four generations until 1996.

=== Fieldbrook Farms ===
A group of investors led by James J. Greco purchased Dunkirk Ice Cream's assets and renamed the company Fieldbrook Farms Inc. in mid-1996, sparking a rapid increase in the company's sales, doubling revenues to $100 million, and expanding the company' employee count to over 500 people. The early 2000s economic recession, coupled with a skyrocketing in the cost of ingredients, caused the company to close its Georgia plant and, in September 2001, to file for bankruptcy. Spruce Bank Enterprises, LLC, a private investment fund and food giant Suiza Foods Corp. bid for the company with Spruce Bank having the winning bid. In March 2002, the company was renamed Fieldbrook Foods Corporation while continuing to operate as Fieldbrook Farms.

In December 2010, Fieldbrook Foods agreed to be acquired by Arbor Investments. Arbor exited its investment in April 2019, having grown revenues at Fieldbrook nearly 70% during its holding period. Fieldbrook Farms was acquired by Wells Enterprises, maker of Blue Bunny ice cream and the third-largest ice cream manufacturer in the United States.
