= Dick Sweeney =

American businessman

Richard Sweeney is an American businessman. He is a vice president at the coffee brewing system company Keurig.

== Early life ==
Sweeney grew up in Roselle Park, New Jersey and graduated from Roselle Catholic High School in 1966. Three months later he was drafted and served a 13-month tour of duty in Vietnam as a soldier of the United States Army. While in Vietnam, Sweeney served as a medic, then as a team leader on the Long Range Reconnaissance Patrols. Upon returning home to New Jersey, Sweeney received a Bachelor's degree from Newark College of Engineering (now known as the New Jersey Institute of Technology) in 1982, financed by the GI Bill. After graduation, he enrolled in graduate school and received an MBA from Fairleigh Dickinson University in 1986.

== Career ==
After returning home from Vietnam, Sweeney worked at United Parcel Service as a driver. After that, he went on to a factory job where he became fascinated with the process, and decided to pursue higher education. Sweeney completed his education with an MBA from Fairleigh Dickinson University in 1986 and continued to work in manufacturing. He joined Keurig full-time in 1996 as its Vice President of Engineering.

== Award recognitions ==
In 2006, the New Jersey Institute of Technology awarded Sweeney with their Entrepreneurial Leadership Award, and in 2018 it presented him with an honorary degree.

== Personal life ==
Sweeney has been married to his wife Els since 1986 and they have one daughter. The Sweeneys currently reside in Winchester, Massachusetts.
