= New England Coffee =

Coffee firm

New England Tea & Coffee Company, LLC.
- New England Coffee Logo
- Type: Subsidiary
- Industry: Beverage
- Founded: Boston, Massachusetts, United States (1916; 110 years ago)
- Founder: Menelaos Kaloyanides, George Kaloyanides
- Headquarters: Malden, Massachusetts, United States
- Products: Coffee and tea
- Number of employees: 250
- Website: NewEnglandCoffee.com

New England Coffee is a coffee roaster located in New England. It was founded in Boston, Massachusetts, in 1916 by Menelaos and George Kaloyanides.

== History ==
In 1916, brothers Menelaos and George Kaloyanides, who had immigrated to the United States from Greece, started the New England Tea & Coffee Company. Originally located in a building at the corner of Milk and Broad Streets in Boston, hand-roasted coffee was once delivered by horse and wagon along the streets of Boston. The first gasoline-powered truck was purchased in 1918, and, soon after, other family members started to join the growing business.

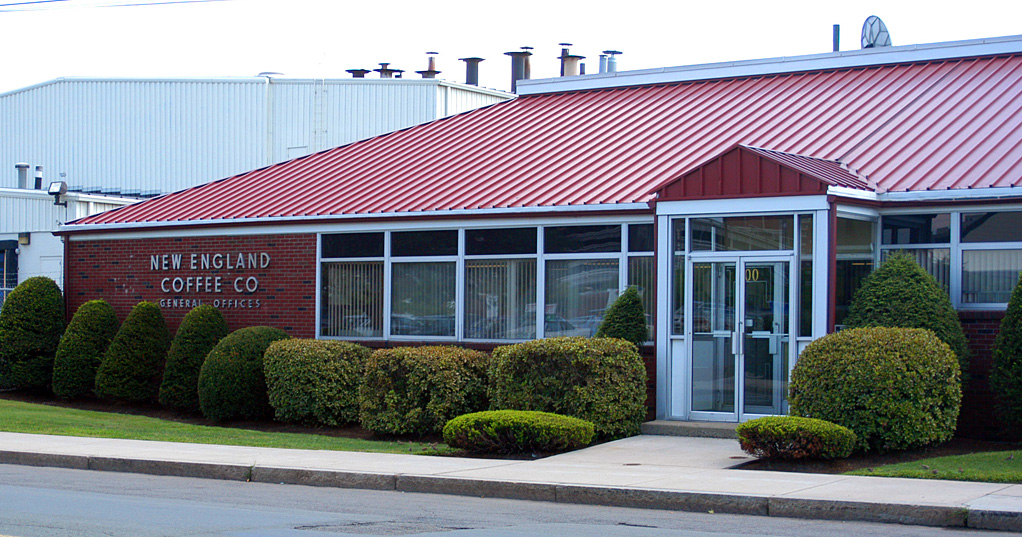
New England Coffee Company Headquarters

In 1966, New England Coffee settled into its present location at 100 Charles Street in Malden, Massachusetts. Today, New England Coffee occupies five buildings and has expanded its manufacturing and packaging capabilities. Four generations of the Kaloyanides family have led the business since its inception: Menelaos Kaloyanides (1916-1966); Stephen Kaloyanides (1966-1996); James M. Kaloyanides (1996-2013) and James B. Kaloyanides (2013-2016). The Kaloyanides family has traveled throughout the world's coffee-growing regions; James B. eventually spent over half of a year in Costa Rica. In 2022, James B. rejoined Reily Foods Company as Senior Vice President and General Manager, reprising his role as leader of the company that his great-grandfather began. New England Coffee offers coffee varietals, blends, flavored coffees, and full-bodied dark roasts with Arabica coffee beans. The Decaffeinated Colombian and Colombian Supremo have both been reviewed by Consumer Reports. In 2016, New England Coffee celebrated its 100th anniversary.

== Availability ==
Today, New England Coffee serves over 10,000 Foodservice and Retail Customers nationally. Foodservice locations include:

- Restaurants
- Hotels and Inns
- Coffee and Bagel Shops
- Convenience Stores
- Colleges and Universities
- Healthcare
- Cafeterias

New England Coffee Retail Ground Coffee is also sold at participating supermarket retailers such as at Target and Walmart throughout the United States.
