= Brioche Dorée =

French bakery franchise

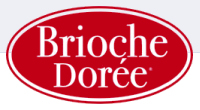

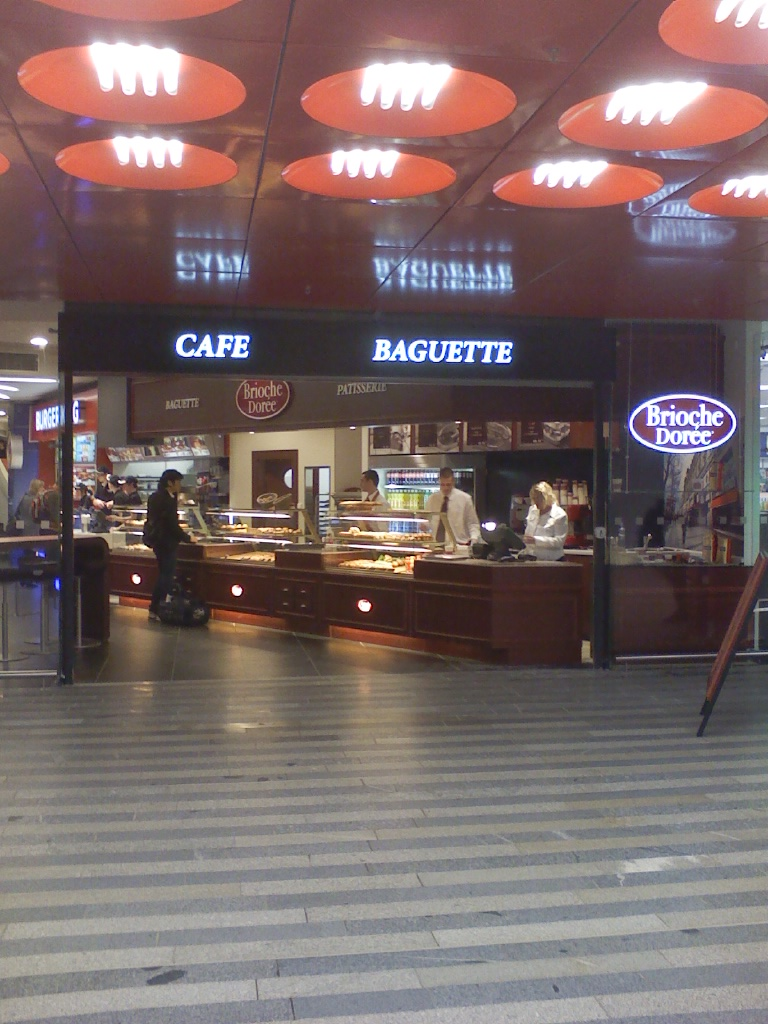
- A Brioche Dorée restaurant in Prague Central Station
- Type: Subsidiary
- Industry: Restaurants
- Founded: 1976; 50 years ago
- Founder: Louis Le Duff
- Headquarters: Rennes, France
- Number of locations: 443
- Area served: Worldwide
- Products: Breads; Sandwiches; Salads; Soups
- Number of employees: 7,500 (2023)
- Parent: Groupe Le Duff
- Website: briochedoree.com

Brioche Dorée is a French chain of bakery-café restaurants founded in 1976 and originally started in Brest. The company was founded by Louis Le Duff, current president of Groupe Le Duff. The name means "Golden Brioche" in French.

It serves over 270,000 customers every day in 443 locations worldwide, 60% of which are franchised, located mainly in France. Many of their international locations are inside airports and train stations.

In 2013, the result of a survey published in France by the Huffington Post indicates that Brioche Dorée is ranked second, behind Paul, on a list of 17 chains of fast-food in France.

== History ==
Louis Le Duff opened his first Brioche Dorée establishment in 1976, in Brest, France, with the equivalent of €1,500 of personal contribution. On this occasion, he inaugurated the first "French-style" fast food establishment, a concept he had brought back from his stays in the United States.

The company developed into a franchise in 1992.
