= Category design =

Category design is a business strategy and discipline that helps companies create, develop, and dominate new categories of products and services.

Category design extends beyond a leadership team's narrower focus on products, company culture and business models. Taught in academia as a business and market strategy, it is explicitly deployed by disruptive innovation companies like Uber, Airbnb and other start up brands. Business magazines such as Harvard Business Review and Inc. have published articles on the value of category design. Marc Benioff is an aficionado.

In academic terms, category design fits within research on the dynamics of product and market categories, such as the historical emergence of new categories vs. entrepreneurial efforts to valorize a new category of product or market. Different forms of gatekeeping are also relevant to categories of markets and products, from critics who determine which books are deemed to belong to a genre, to art gallerists who decide which customers are worthy to buy a high value artwork.

== History ==
Category design was first proposed in the book Play Bigger. The book lays out a justification for why category creation is an important strategy, and includes a step-by-step guide to applying design thinking to category creation:

- discovering and defining a category problem,
- creating a clear story (called a point-of-view) that explains and sells the category idea,
- defining a category blueprint,
- driving the category strategy across a company's stakeholders (mobilization),
- shaping customers' thinking (lightning strikes).

The concepts tie back into recent writings about how our brains work, particularly cognitive biases as described by Daniel Kahneman. Good category takes advantage of cognitive biases such as the choice supportive bias and groupthink bias.

After the book was published in June 2016, Mike Maples, a founding partner of Floodgate, published articles supporting the concept.

The book, "Play Bigger" was co-authored by Christopher Lochhead, Dave Peterson, Al Ramadan, and Kevin Maney.

=== The 6–10 law ===
Data research shows that "category kings" (companies that dominates a market category) that go public when they are between six and ten years old create most of the value among all VC-funded tech companies. Companies that go public sooner than six years old often lose value; companies that IPO after ten years old create little value for shareholders. The reason is thought to be that categories take around six years to develop, and most of a category's growth happens in that six to ten year timeframe. After ten years, a category is established and growth slows, so share prices level off. This was discussed in a Harvard Business Review article titled "How Unicorns Grow".

== See also ==
- Cornering the market
- New business development
- Value chain
- Value network
- Value shop
- List of unicorn startup companies
