= Newk's Eatery =

Restaurant chain in the United States

- Company type: Private
- Industry: Restaurants
- Founded: 2004; 22 years ago in Oxford, Mississippi
- Headquarters: Jackson, Mississippi, United States
- Number of locations: 100+
- Key people: Don Newcomb, co-founder; Chris Newcomb, co-founder; Frank Paci, CEO
- Products: Fast casual/café, including hot and cold sandwiches, flatbreads, salads, and soups
- Revenue: ▲$141 million USD (2014)
- Number of employees: Approximately 5,000 full/part time (including franchises)
- Website: newks.com

Newk's Eatery is an American chain of fast casual cafés which operates over 100 restaurants in 13 states.

== Corporate history ==
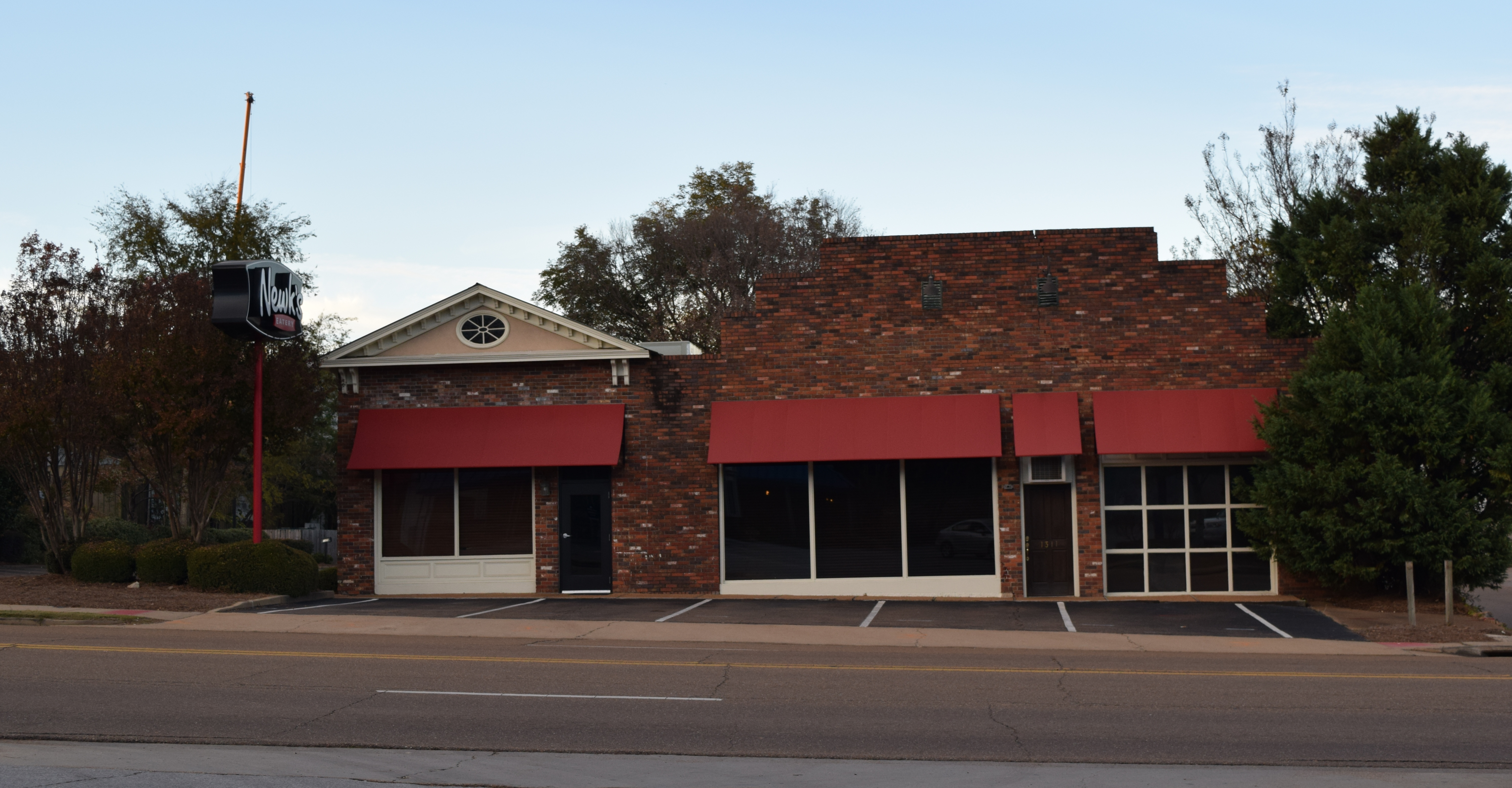
The original Newk's Eatery in Oxford, Mississippi

Newk's Eatery was founded in 2004 as Newk's Express Café by father and son chefs, Don and Chris Newcomb, with the first store opening in Oxford, Mississippi. Before establishment of Newks, Don and Chris Newcomb had previously created and sold their restaurant chain McAlister's Deli to Focus Brand.

In 2013, the company rebranded itself as Newk's Eatery. In addition to the updated name, the company introduced a fresh design to its logo.

The business was bought by private equity firm Sentinel Capital Partners in 2014 for an undisclosed amount, identifying the chain's opportunity for growth as a driving factor in the decision to acquire the company. Sentinel, which specializes in buying and building companies, implemented a plan for rapid growth. Shortly after its acquisition by Sentinel, Newk's announced plans to grow to more than 300 units by 2018.

Today, over 100 Newk's locations operate in 13 U.S. states. The company is headquartered in Jackson, Mississippi. Newk's announced $141 million in revenue in 2014.

== Fare ==
Newk's sells gourmet sandwiches, soups, salads, California-style pizzas, desserts, fruit, coffee, speciality drinks, alcohol, and a large variety of related items. The chain maintains a focus on products being made "from-scratch" as a marketing angle.

== Interior ==
The standard for the interior of the chain's establishments is to have an open kitchen and utilise large round tables. Complimentary condiments and snacks are also provided.

== See also ==
- List of bakery cafés
