= Groupe Le Duff =

French restaurant conglomerate

Groupe Le Duff's logo

Groupe Le Duff is a French restaurant conglomerate, with holdings in Europe and the Americas, consisting of over 1,310 restaurants and bakeries. It includes Bridor, La Madeleine, Kamps, Mimi's Cafe, Pizza Del Arte, and Brioche Dorée.

The company was founded in 1976, by Louis Le Duff, with the opening of the first Brioche Dorée in Brest, France. As of 2014, the company had 28,000 employees and sales of € 1.5 billion.

Its headquarters are in Rennes, France.

== History ==
Louis Le Duff opened his first establishment with the Brioche Dorée sign in 1976 with the equivalent of €1,500 of personal contribution. He created the first "French-style" fast food establishment.

In 1983, Louis Le Duff diversified the group's activities with the creation of the "Pizzeria Lucio" chain which merged with the Pizza Del Arte brand, renamed Del Arte after its takeover from the Accor Group in 1996.

In 1984, the first Bridor factory opened in Montreal. Four years later the first hexagonal unit moved to Servon-sur-Vilaine in Ille-et-Vilaine.

In 1989, the Le Duff Group acquired the Fournil de Pierre brand. In July 2022, Le Duff acquired Lecoq Cuisine Corp., a Connecticut-based manufacturer of Viennese and French-style pastries.

== Le Duff America ==
Le Duff America operates the conglomerate's US restaurant chains. These consist primarily of La Madeleine Country French Café, Brioche Dorée, and Mimi's Cafe. Le Duff America is headquartered in Dallas, Texas. It was formed following the acquisition of Bruegger's by Groupe Le Duff in 2011, at the time naming Bruegger's CEO James J. Greco and CEO of Groupe Le Duff's prior American operations, Claude Bergeron, as co-CEOs of Le Duff America. Le Duff sold Bruegger's in 2017 to Caribou Coffee.

In 2018, MTY Food Group announced the acquisition of Timothy's World Coffee along with Mmmuffins from Le Duff America.
