= Louis Le Duff =

French businessman

- Born: 1945 or 1946 (age 80–81)
- Education: École supérieure des sciences commerciales d'Angers; Université de Sherbrooke; University of Rennes
- Known for: Founder and CEO, Groupe Le Duff and Brioche Dorée
- Children: 2

Louis Le Duff (born 1945/1946) is a French billionaire businessman, and the founder and CEO of Groupe Le Duff and the Brioche Dorée bakery chain.

== Early life ==
Le Duff went to school at Lycée de la Croix-Rouge, Brest. He earned a bachelor's degree from the École supérieure des sciences commerciales d'Angers (ESSCA), an MBA from the Université de Sherbrooke, Canada, and a PhD in management sciences from the University of Rennes.

== Career ==
He worked as a teacher at the Rouen Business School, and then a lecturer at the University of Rennes 1, Rennes.

Le Duff opened the first branch of Brioche Dorée in Brest in 1976. The chain now has 1,310 locations in 80 countries.

== Personal life ==
Le Duff is married with two children, and lives in Paris.
