= La Madeleine (restaurant chain) =

Restaurant chain in the United States

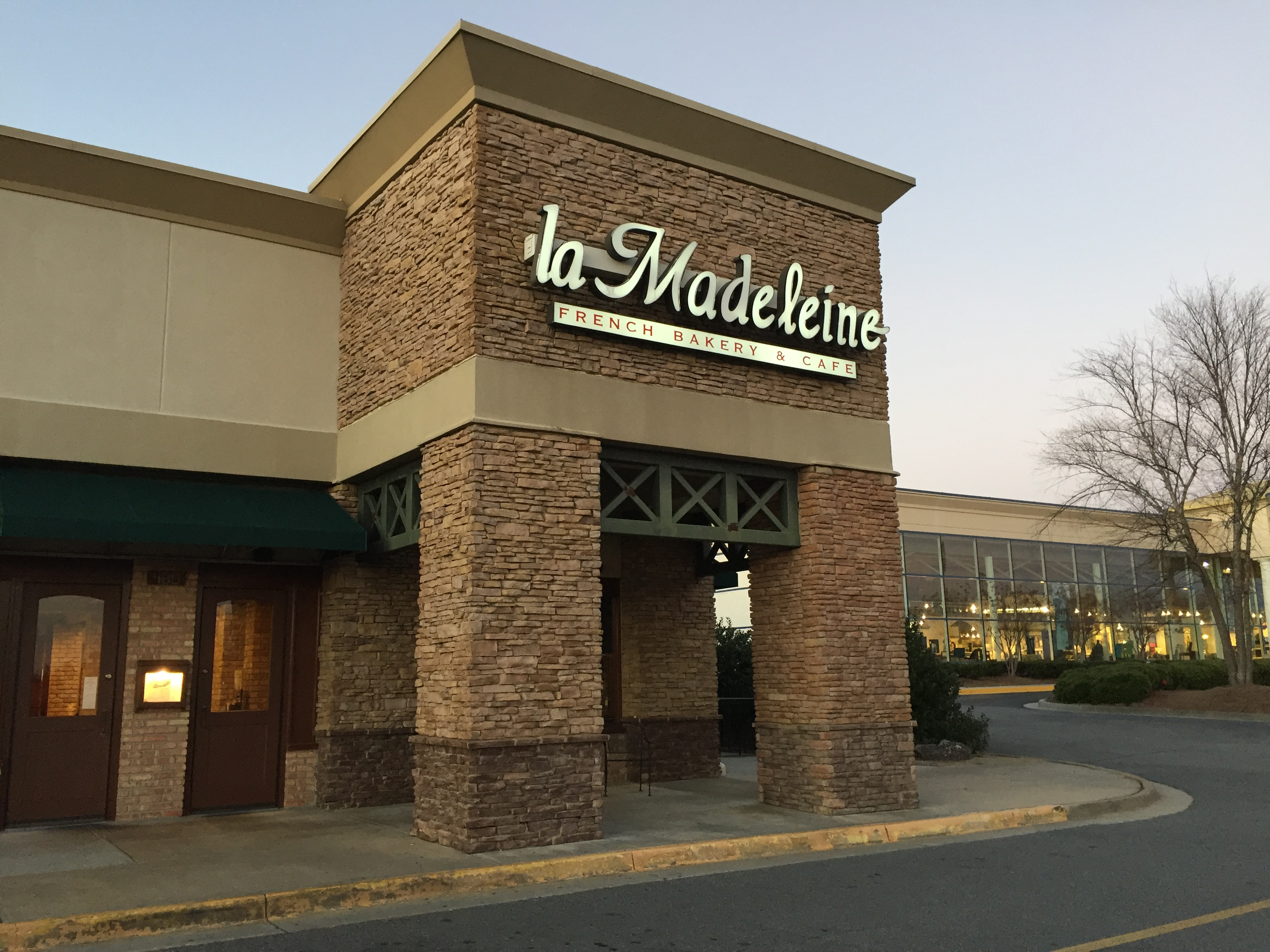
- La Madeleine in Duluth, Georgia
- Type: Subsidiary
- Industry: Restaurants
- Founded: February 1983; 43 years ago in Dallas, Texas
- Headquarters: Dallas, Texas, United States
- Key people: Patrick Esquerré (founder)
- Products: Fast casual/bakery-café, including sandwiches, salads, and soups
- Parent: Groupe Le Duff
- Website: www.lamadeleine.com

La Madeleine de Corps, Inc., operating as La Madeleine, is a restaurant chain of 86 locations (as of 2018) in the U.S. states of Georgia, Kentucky, Florida, Louisiana, Maryland, Oklahoma, Texas, Arkansas, Virginia and Arizona. Its headquarters is in Dallas, Texas.

== History ==
La Madeleine Country French Café was founded in February 1983 by Patrick Esquerré, a Loire Valley-born businessman. With the advice and support of legendary retail magnate Stanley Marcus, of Neiman Marcus fame, and his mother, Monique Esquerré, he opened his first bakery on Mockingbird Lane in Dallas, Texas near Southern Methodist University, and it soon expanded to a café.

In 1998, Esquerré resigned and La Madeleine was sold to four investment companies. In 2001, the company was sold again to Groupe Le Duff, a French restaurant chain company owned by Louis Le Duff, and co-purchasers Lapointe Rosenstein and Cadigan Investment Partners, for an undisclosed amount.

In 2008, the company caused outrage after discontinuing the free side of bread after 20 years due to wheat costs, and started charging 49 cents. In addition, the restaurants only offered sourdough bread with certain items that were purchased such as entrées, soups, and salads. However, the discontinuation was recalled three days later with the suggestion that customers not waste the food after La Madeleine allegedly received a "couple hundred responses...mostly complaints".

Food is served cafeteria style for breakfast, lunch, and dinner. The buildings are designed to resemble restaurants found across the French countryside. Farm tools and impressionist paintings hang on the walls, and the restaurants are known for keeping a fire burning in winter. However, in March 2010, at the Preston Rd/Forest Ln location in Dallas, the cafeteria style was dropped for a modern ordering station system.

In a news article regarding this, Esquerré called his resignation a regret and announced he was joining La Madeleine again as an ambassador/adviser, claiming he was even "going to be in the dishwashing room". That same year, La Madeleine's Belt Line Rd location in Dallas was named "Best Soup in Dallas" by Dallas Observer. Esquerré has commented that he dislikes the term "chain," and has repeatedly referred to his restaurants as a family.

The original store is still in existence, at 3072 Mockingbird Lane, Dallas, Texas, despite major reconstruction of the surrounding area by SMU.

The chain was named a winner of the Great Dallas Business Ethics Award in 2018 by the North Texas Ethics Association.

Current President is Philippe Jean, French former CEO of the Del Arte brand, another sister company inside Le Duff Group in France. Philippe Jean has been with Le Duff for more than 7 years. He has been in the industry for 30 years in companies such as Sodexo, Pierre et Vacances Center Parcs, Elior Areas and Groupe Flo.

== See also ==
- List of French restaurants
- List of restaurants in Dallas
