= Ann Birstein =

American novelist (1927–2017)

- Born: Ann Judith Birstein; May 27, 1927; New York City, U.S.
- Died: May 24, 2017 (aged 89); New York City, U.S.
- Education: Queens College
- Occupations: Novelist; memoirist; essayist; film critic; blogger; professor
- Spouse: Alfred Kazin (m. 1952; div. 1982)
- Children: 1
- Relatives: Bernard Birstein (father)

Ann Judith Birstein (May 27, 1927 – May 24, 2017) was an American Fulbright Scholar, novelist, memoirist, essayist, film critic, blogger, and professor.

== Biography ==
She was born in the Hell's Kitchen neighborhood of New York City and was the daughter of the notable Rabbi Bernard Birstein of the Actor's Temple. She attended Queens College and published her first novel, Star of Glass, in 1950 at the age of twenty three. She was married to and later divorced the literary critic Alfred Kazin, with whom she had a daughter, Cathrael Kazin. Birstein was also stepmother to professor and author Michael Kazin. She was a former professor of Barnard College.

She died at home in New York on May 24, 2017, following a long illness.

== Novels ==
- Star of Glass (1950)
- The Troublemaker
- The Sweet Birds of Gorham
- Summer Situations
- Dickie's List
- American Children
- The Rabbi on Forty-seventh Street (biography of her father, Rabbi Bernard Birstein)
- The Last of the True Believers
- What I Saw at the Fair (autobiography)
- Vanity Fare (2009)
