= Alfred Kazin =

American writer (1915–1988)

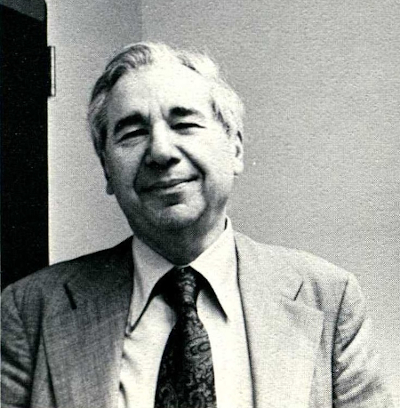
- Kazin in 1973
- Born: June 5, 1915; New York City, U.S.
- Died: June 5, 1998 (aged 83); New York City, U.S.
- Occupations: Literary critic; writer; professor
- Spouse(s): Natasha Dohn (divorced); Caroline Bookman (divorced); Ann Birstein (1952-1982); Judith Dunford (1983-1998)
- Children: 2

Alfred Kazin (June 5, 1915 – June 5, 1998) was an American writer and literary critic. His literary reviews appeared in The New York Times, the New York Herald-Tribune, The New Republic and The New Yorker. He wrote often about the immigrant experience in early twentieth-century America. His trilogy of memoirs, A Walker in the City (1951), Starting Out in the Thirties (1965) and New York Jew (1978), were all finalists for the National Book Award for Nonfiction.

He was a distinguished professor of English at Stony Brook University of the State University of New York (1963–1973) and the Graduate Center of the City University of New York (1973–1978, 1979–1985).

== Early life ==
He was born to Russian Jewish immigrants in the Brownsville section of Brooklyn, New York City. His father, Charles Kazin, was a house-painter from Minsk. His mother, Gita Fagelman, was a dressmaker from Russian Poland. His father was a socialist and acolyte of Eugene V. Debs, while his mother was Orthodox. His sister, Pearl Kazin Bell (1922–2011) was also a writer and critic. She was an assistant literary editor at Harper's Bazaar as well as a regular fiction critic for The New Leader, Partisan Review and Commentary.

He graduated from Franklin K. Lane High School and the City College of New York. However, his politics were more moderate than most of the New York Intellectuals, many of whom were socialists. He rejected Stalin early on. In 1934, he got an early break reviewing books for The New Republic. The opportunity came about after he visited The New York Times office that summer to express his disagreement with a book review published by the newspaper that was written by John Chamberlain. Chamberlain met with Kazin and was impressed by his arguments and recommended him to editors at The New Republic. He also graduated with an MA from Columbia University in 1938.

== Career ==
Kazin was deeply affected by his peers' subsequent disillusion with socialism and liberalism. Adam Kirsch writes in The New Republic that "having invested his romantic self-image in liberalism, Kazin perceived abandonment of liberalism by his peers as an attack on his identity".

In 1942, at the age of 27, he published his first book, On Native Grounds: An Interpretation of Modern American Prose Literature. Orville Prescott of The New York Times wrote: "With 'On Native Grounds' he takes his place in the first rank of American practitioners of the higher literary criticism."

In 1951, he wrote the acclaimed memoir A Walker in the City, where he details his childhood in the Jewish milieu of Brownsville in Brooklyn. It was a finalist for the National Book Award for Nonfiction in 1952. The subsequent sequels, Starting Out in the Thirties (1965) and New York Jew (1978) were also finalists for the National Book Award for Nonfiction.

He embedded in his published opinions knowledge of literary history, politics, and culture. In 1996 he was awarded the first Truman Capote Lifetime Achievement Award in Literary Criticism, which carries a cash award of $100,000. As of 2014, the only other person to have won the award was George Steiner.

In 1963 he became a distinguished professor in the English Department at the State University of New York at Stony Brook. He stayed at Stony Brook for ten years before taking up distinguished professor positions at Hunter College and the Graduate Center of the City University of New York (1973–1978, 1979–1985).

== Personal life ==
Kazin was friends with Hannah Arendt.

Kazin's son from his second marriage is historian and Dissent co-editor Michael Kazin. Alfred Kazin married his third wife, the writer Ann Birstein, in 1952, and they divorced in 1982; their daughter is Cathrael Kazin. Prior to his death, Cathrael had made Aliyah to Israel. She is an attorney and education specialist.

Kazin married a fourth time, and is survived by his widow, the writer Judith Dunford.

== Death ==
Kazin died at his home on the Upper West Side in Manhattan, New York, on his 83rd birthday in 1998. At his request, he had a small funeral ceremony. He was cremated and did not have a Jewish service. However, his son, Michael, said Kaddish. A year later, Michael and his step-mother, Judith scattered his ashes in the East River.

== Bibliography ==
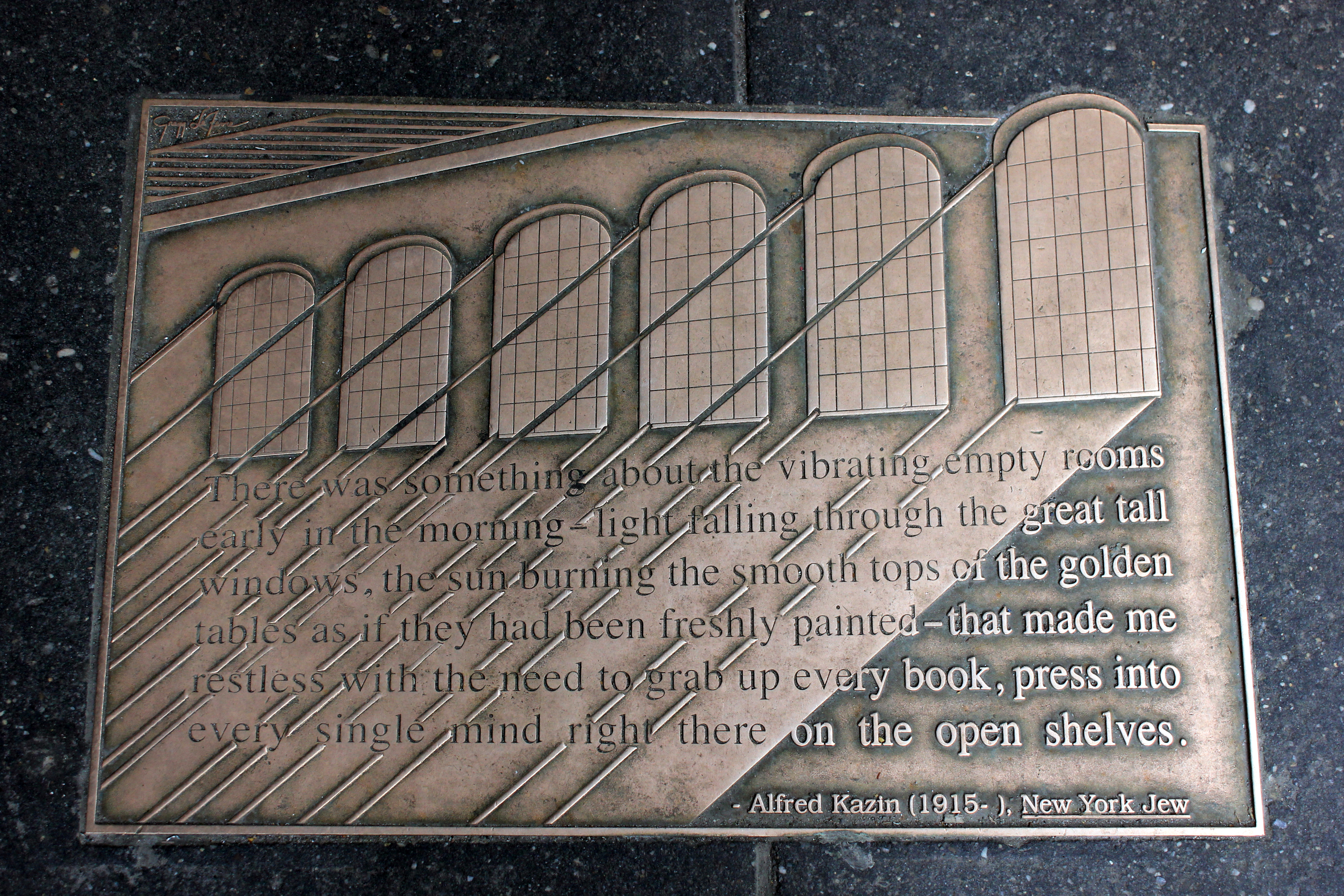
Library Walk New York City, excerpt from New York Jew

=== Author ===
- On Native Grounds: An Interpretation of Modern American Prose Literature (1942)
- The Open Street (1948)
- A Walker in the City (1951)
- The Inmost Leaf: Essays on American and European Writers (1955)
- Contemporaries: Essays on Modern Life and Literature (1963)
- Starting Out in the Thirties (1965)
- Bright Book of Life: American Novelists and Storytellers from Hemingway to Mailer (1973)
- New York Jew (1978)
- The State of the Book World, 1980: Three Talks (1980), with Dan Lacy and Ernest L. Boyer
- An American Procession: The Major American Writers from 1830 to 1930—The Crucial Century (1984)
- A Writer's America: Landscape in Literature (1988)
- Our New York (1989), co-authored with David Finn
- The Emmy Parrish Lectures in American Studies (1991)
- Writing Was Everything (1995)
- A Lifetime Burning in Every Moment: From the Journals of Alfred Kazin (1996)
- God and the American Writer (1997)
- Alfred Kazin's America: Critical and Personal Writings (2003), edited and with an introduction by Ted Solotaroff
- Alfred Kazin's Journals (2011), selected and edited by Richard M. Cook

=== Editor (selected) ===
- The Portable Blake The Viking Press, 1946, reprinted many times between 1959 and 1975; Penguin Books 1976, reprinted 1977, ISBN 0140150269
- F. Scott Fitzgerald: The Man and His Work
- The Stature of Theodore Dreiser, co-edited with Charles Shapiro
- Emerson: A Modern Anthology, co-edited with Daniel Aaron
- The Works of Anne Frank, co-edited with Ann Birstein
- The Open Form: Essays for Our Time
- Selected Short Stories of Nathaniel Hawthorne
