= A Walker in the City =

1951 memoir

- 1951 cover
- Author: Alfred Kazin
- Language: English
- Genre: Autobiography
- Publisher: Harcourt
- Publication date: 1951
- Publication place: United States
- Pages: 192
- ISBN: 9780156941761

A Walker in the City is the 1951 memoir by New York intellectual, writer and literary critic, Alfred Kazin. Kazin writes about his childhood in the then-Jewish neighborhood of Brownsville in Brooklyn. It was followed by the memoirs, Starting Out in the Thirties (1965) and New York Jew (1978).

== Reception ==
It was a finalist for the National Book Award for Nonfiction in 1952. The New York Times book reviewer, Orville Prescott, praised the book: "As a work of descriptive, emotional, lyrical writing, "A Walker in the City" is good. Mr. Kazin has recorded the sordid and unpleasant as well as the colorful and touching. He makes you feel the summer heat and taste the Jewish foods and smell the odors of Brownsville in the Nineteen Twenties and the first year or two of the depression." Canadian Jewish writer, Mordecai Richler was also complimentary, describing it as "splendid... a book I still cherish."

David Daiches also published a favorable review in Commentary: "Its relish of sensation projects the very quality of living in that way at that time in that atmosphere, and the underlying theme of the development of a boy’s sensitivity—of his responses to his neighborhood, to his city, to his country, as well as to his Jewishness and his Jewish past—enriches the narrative so that it becomes more than a sociological picture and more than a study in mood: it becomes a contribution both to Americana and to Judaica."

In 2013 it was included in Tablet magazine's "101 Great Jewish Books" list.
