= New York Jew (book) =

1978 memoir

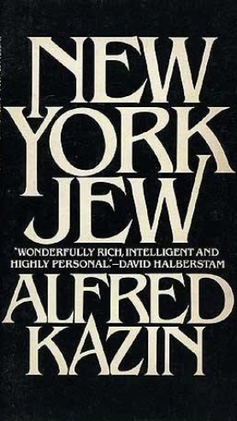
- Author: Alfred Kazin
- Language: English
- Genre: Autobiography
- Publisher: Knopf
- Publication date: 12 April 1978
- Publication place: United States
- Pages: 207
- ISBN: 978-0394495675

New York Jew is the 1978 memoir by New York intellectual, writer and literary critic, Alfred Kazin. It is a sequel to his previous volumes of memoirs; A Walker in the City (1951) and Starting Out in the Thirties (1965). Although not religiously observant, he writes in the memoir: "the Jews are my unconscious." Kazin had previously published a column in The New York Review of Books in 1972, with the same title as the memoir.

== Reception ==
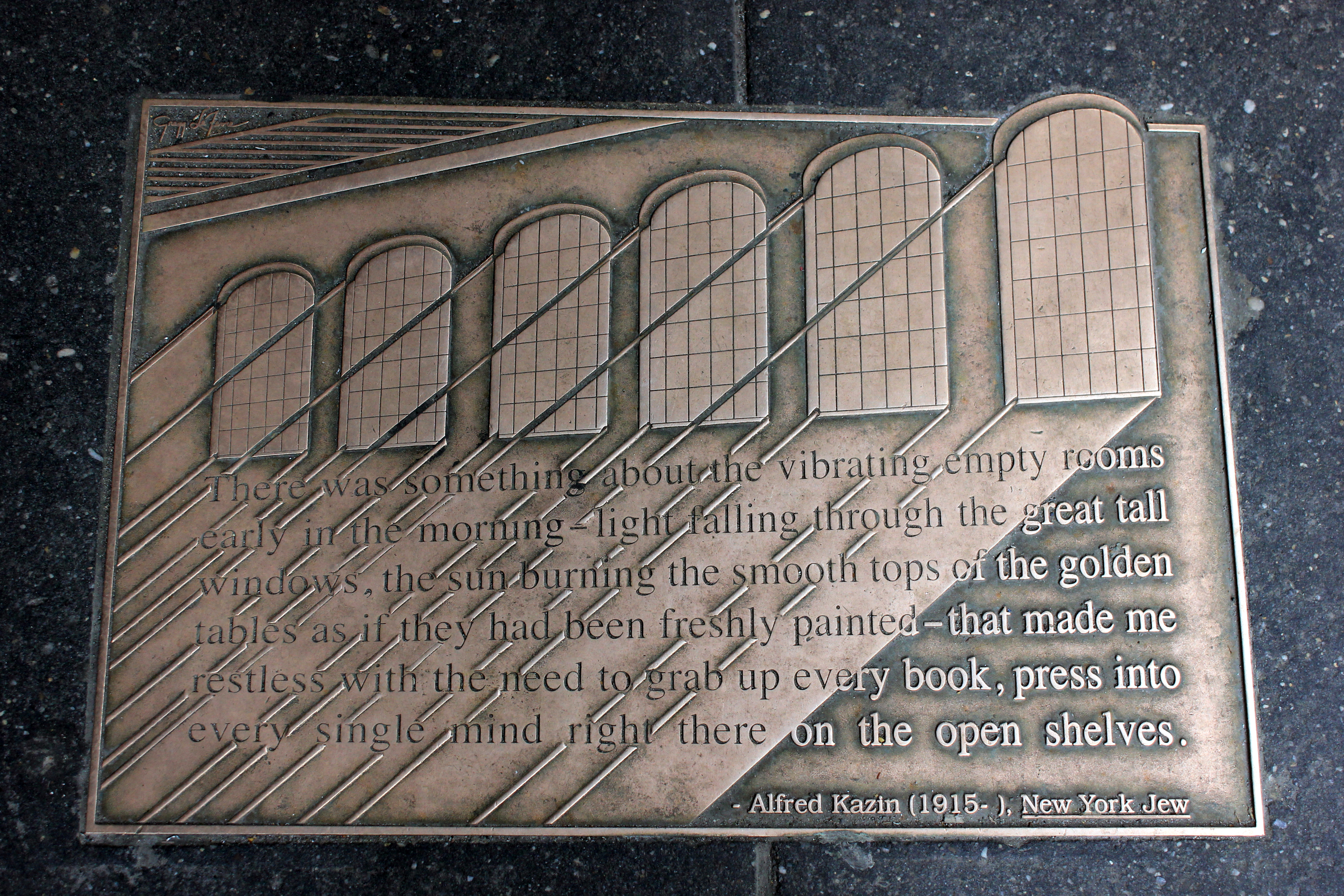
Library Way, New York City, excerpt from New York Jew

It was a finalist for the National Book Award for Nonfiction (Contemporary Thought) in 1979.

The memoir was praised by Mordecai Richler in The New York Times: "It's a front-line dispatch from an intelligent if somewhat bruised survivor of literary and marital wars, charged with appetite and high purpose, but not above administering an accurate little jab as often as a passing salute."

In December 1978 it was included in The New York Times' "selection of the best books of 1978."
