= Brownsville, Brooklyn =

Neighborhood in New York City

Brownsville
- Neighborhood of Brooklyn
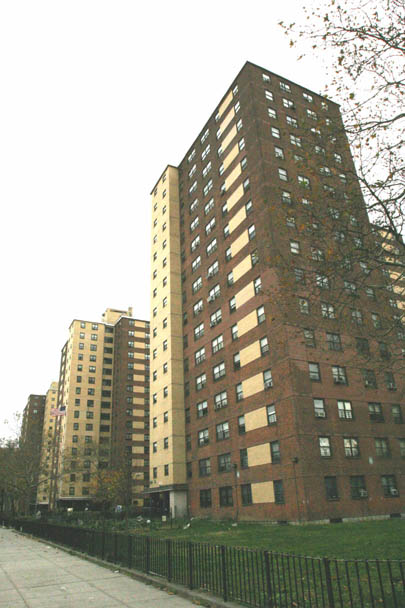
- The Samuel J. Tilden Houses, one of many NYCHA public housing developments located in Brownsville, circa 2005
- Interactive map of Brownsville
- Coordinates: 40.662°N 73.909°W
- Country: United States
- State: New York
- City: New York City
- Borough: Brooklyn
- Community District: Brooklyn 16
- Parceled: 1858
- European settlement: 1861
- Founder: William Suydam
- Named for: Charles S. Brown

Area
  - Total: 1.163 sq mi (3.01 km^{2})

Population (2010)
  - Total: 58,300
  - Density: 50,100/sq mi (19,400/km^{2})

Economics
  - Median income: $31,252

Ethnicity
  - White: 3.8%
  - African American: 68.4%
  - Hispanic American: 25.6%
  - Asian: 0.9%
  - Other: 1.3%
- Time zone: UTC−5 (Eastern)
  - Summer (DST): UTC−4 (EDT)
- ZIP Codes: 11212, 11233
- Area codes: 718, 347, 929, and 917

Brownsville is a residential neighborhood in eastern Brooklyn in New York City. The neighborhood is bordered by Crown Heights to the northwest; Bedford–Stuyvesant and the subsection of Ocean Hill to the north; East New York to the east; Canarsie to the south; and East Flatbush to the west.

The 1.163-square-mile (3.01 km^{2}) area that comprises Brownsville has 58,300 residents as of the 2010 United States census, with an estimated population of 128,369 residents in 2019. Founded in its current incarnation in 1858, Brownsville was initially a settlement composed of Jewish factory workers. The neighborhood underwent a major demographic change in the 1950s that saw an influx of African-American residents. Since the late 20th century, Brownsville has consistently held one of the highest poverty and crime rates of any neighborhood in New York City, even at times when crime rates were declining elsewhere in the borough.

Brownsville is part of Brooklyn Community District 16, and its primary ZIP Code is 11212. It is patrolled by the 73rd Precinct of the New York City Police Department. Politically it is represented by the New York City Council's 42nd and 41st Districts.

== History ==
=== Early development ===
The area that would become Brownsville was first used by the Dutch for farming, as well as manufacturing stone slabs and other things used to construct buildings. In 1823–1824, the Dutch founded the New Lots Reformed Church in nearby New Lots because the corresponding church in Flatbush was too far away. The church, which has its own cemetery that was built in 1841, was listed on the National Register of Historic Places in 1983.

In 1858, William Suydam parceled the land into 262 lots, providing simple two- to four-room accommodations for workers who were living there. However, Suydam vastly underestimated how undesirable the area was, and ran out of funding in 1861. After failing to pay his mortgages, the land was auctioned off in 1866 to Charles S. Brown of Esopus, New York. Believing the area to be useful for development, Brown subdivided the area and began calling it "Brownsville", advertising the area's wide open spaces to Jews who lived in Lower Manhattan. There were 250 houses in "Brown's Village" by 1883, most of them occupied by factory workers who commuted to Manhattan. The first houses in the area were built by Charles R. Miller.

Through the 1880s, the area was a marshy floodplain that was used as a dumping ground. Fumes from the glue factories along Jamaica Bay would usually blow upwind into Brownsville. This place was inconveniently far enough from Manhattan that the affluent refused to move to Brownsville, but the land was cheap enough that tenements could be built for the poor there.

=== Jewish neighborhood (1880s-1950s) ===
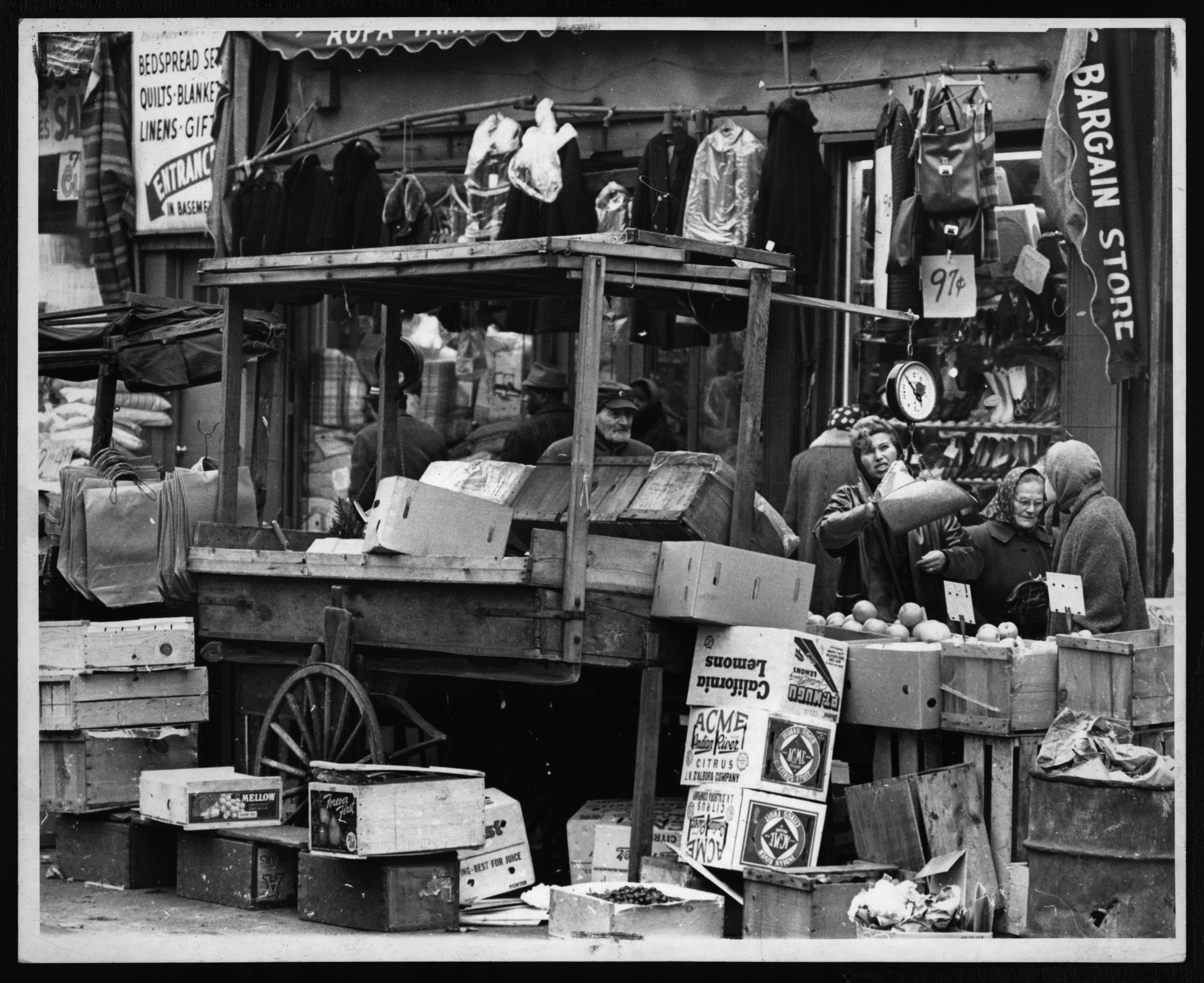
A street market on Belmont Avenue in 1962, when the neighborhood still had a large Jewish presence.

Brownsville was predominantly Jewish from the 1880s until the 1950s. In 1887, businessman Elias Kaplan showed the first Jewish residents around Brownsville, painting the area as favorable compared to the Lower East Side, which he described as a place where one could not get away from the holds of labor unions. Kaplan built a factory and accommodations for his workers, then placed a synagogue, named Ohev Sholom, in his own factory. Other manufacturers that created low-tech products like food, furniture, and metals followed suit throughout the next decade, settling their factories in Brownsville. This led to much more housing being built there. The area bounded by present-day Dumont, Rockaway, and Liberty Avenues, and Junius Street, quickly became densely populated, with "factories, workshops, and stores" located next to housing. The farm of a local farmer, John J. Vanderveer, was cut up into lots and given to Jewish settlers after he sold it in 1892. Within three years of the first lot being distributed, there were 10,000 Jews living in Brownsville. By 1904, the lots comprising the former Vanderveer farm were entirely owned by Jews, who were spread out across 4 square miles (10 km^{2}).

An estimated 25,000 people lived in Brownsville by 1900, most of whom lived in two-story wooden frame accommodations built for two families each. Many of these buildings were grossly overcrowded, with up to eight families living in some of these two-family houses. They were utilitarian, and according to one New York Herald article, "grossly unattractive". Many of these houses lacked amenities like running water, and their wood construction made these houses susceptible to fires. New brick-and-stone houses erected in the early 1900s were built with indoor plumbing and less prone to fire. The quality of life was further decreased by the fact that there was scant infrastructure to be found in the area, and as a result, the unpaved roads were used as open sewers. Compounding the problem, land prices were high in Brownsville (with lots available for $50 in 1907, then sold for $3,000 two years later), so in order to make their land purchases worthwhile, developers were frequently inspired to build as many apartments on a single lot as they possibly could. Within twenty years of the factories' development, the area acquired a reputation as a vicious slum and breeding ground for crime. By 1904, 22 of the 25 housing units in Brownsville were tenement housing; three years later, only one of these 25 housing units was not a tenement. It became as dense as the very densely packed Lower East Side, according to one account. This also led to dangerous conditions; a 1935 collapse of a tenement stairway killed two people and injured 43 others. This overcrowding was despite the availability of empty space in the fringes of Brownsville. There were also no playgrounds in the area, and the only park in the vicinity was Betsy Head Park.

In the early 20th century, the vast majority of Brownsville residents were born outside the United States; in 1910, 66% of the population were first-generation immigrants, and 80% of these immigrants were from Russia. By 1920, over 80,000 of the area's 100,000 inhabitants were Russian Jews, and Brownsville had been nicknamed "Little Jerusalem". In the 1930s it was considered the most densely populated district in all of Brooklyn. Brownsville was also considered to have the highest density of Jews of any place in the United States through the 1950s. The population remained heavily Jewish until the middle of the century, and the neighborhood boasted some seventy Orthodox synagogues. Many of these synagogues still exist in Brownsville, albeit as churches.

Brownsville was also a place for radical political causes during this time. In 1916, Margaret Sanger set up the first birth control clinic in America on Amboy Street. Throughout the 1920s and 1930s, the neighborhood elected Socialist and American Labor Party candidates to the state assembly. Two Socialist candidates for mayor in 1929 and 1932 both received roughly a quarter of Brownsville residents' mayoral votes. Socialist attitudes prevailed among Brownsville residents until World War II. The area's Jewish population participated heavily in civil rights movements, rallying against such things as poll taxes, Jim Crow laws, and segregation in schools.

The area was fairly economically successful in its heyday. In 1942, there were 372 stores, including 8 banks and 43 stores selling menswear, along a 3-mile (4.8 km) stretch of Pitkin Avenue, which employed a combined 1,000 people and generated an estimated $90 million annually (equal to about $1.773×10^{9} today if adjusted for inflation). The median income of $2,493 in 1933 (about $62,005 today) was twice that of a family living on the Lower East Side, who earned a median of $1,390 (about $34,571 today) but lower than that of a middle-class family in outer Brooklyn ($4,320, inflation-adjusted to $107,445) or the Bronx ($3,750, inflation-adjusted to $93,268). The Fortunoff's furniture chain had its roots on Livonia Avenue, its flagship store overshadowed by the tracks of New York City Subway's New Lots Line from 1922 to 1964, eventually expanding elsewhere in the New York metropolitan area. At one point in the 1943 published book, New York City Market Analysis, it had described Brownsville as having a variety of small industry unlike Lower East Side. The book also mentioned the Jewish populations were a mix of Russian, Austrian, and Polish immigrants and were 80% of the foreign born population in the neighborhood.

In the 1930s, Brownsville achieved notoriety as the birthplace of Murder, Inc., who contracted to kill between 400 and 1,000 people through the 1940s. The organizations' criminal businesses also extended to nearby neighborhoods of Ocean Hill and East New York. The members mainly consisted of Jewish and Italian Americans as these neighborhoods during that time were mainly populated by Jewish and Italian enclaves. A film about the organization was produced and released in 1960.

=== Late 20th century ===
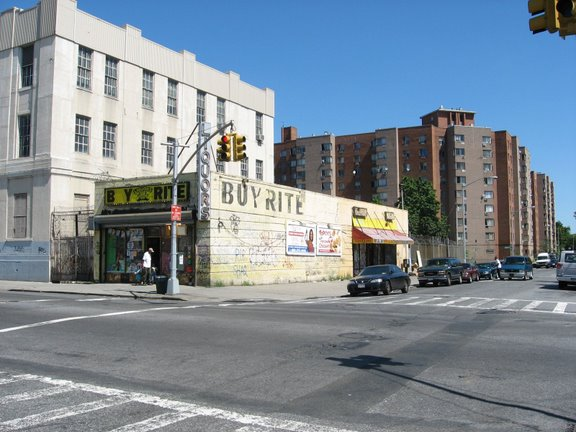
Local retail; the Riverdale Towers sit in the background.

African Americans had begun moving into Brooklyn in large numbers in the early 20th century. The adjacent Bedford-Stuyvesant was the first large African American community of Brooklyn. In the 1930s, Brownsville began to receive growing numbers of African Americans. Most of the new residents were poor and socially disadvantaged, especially the new African-American residents, who were mostly migrants from the Jim Crow-era South where they were racially discriminated against. In 1940, black residents made up 6% of Brownsville's population. The 1943 book New York City Market Analysis indicated the small but growing African American population was concentrated in the central portion of the neighborhood while most of the neighborhood was still populated by Eastern European Jewish immigrants. Although integration did take place in the neighborhood, there were racial tensions as well. By 1950, there were double the number of blacks, most of whom occupied the neighborhood's most undesirable housing. At the same time, new immigration quotas had reduced the number of Russian Jews who were able to immigrate to the United States.

Spurred on by urban planner Robert Moses, the city replaced some of Brownsville's old tenements with public housing blocks. Although the neighborhood was racially segregated, there were more attempts at improved quality of life, public mixing, and solidarity between black and Jewish neighbors than could be found in most other neighborhoods. However, due to socioeconomic barriers imposed by the disparities between the two populations, most of these improvements never came. Compounding the matter, the newly arrived African-American residents were mainly industrial workers who had moved to Brownsville just as the area's factories were going out of business, so the black residents were more economically disadvantaged than the Jews who had historically lived in Brownsville. Finally, although both blacks and Jews living in Brownsville had been subject to ethnic discrimination, the situation for blacks was worse, as they were banned from some public places where Jews were allowed, and the New York City Police Department (NYPD) generally behaved more harshly toward blacks than toward Jews.

The breaking point for the area's Jewish population came about in the 1950s, when the New York City Housing Authority decided to build more new public housing developments in blighted portions of Brownsville. The Jewish population quickly moved out, even though the new NYCHA developments were actually in better condition than the old wooden tenements. Citing increased crime and their desire for social mobility, Jews left Brownsville en masse, with many black and Latino residents moving in, especially into the area's housing developments. For instance, in the Van Dyke Houses, the black population in 1956 was 57% and the white population that year was 43%, with a little over one percent of residents receiving welfare benefits. Seven years later, 72% of the residents were black, 15% Puerto Rican, and the development had the highest rate of per-capita arrests of any housing development citywide.

Through the 1960s, its population became largely African American, and Brownsville's unemployment rate was 17 percent, twice the city's as a whole. The newly majority-black Brownsville neighborhood had few community institutions or economic opportunities. It lacked a middle class, and its residents did not own the businesses they relied upon. In his book Brownsville, Brooklyn: Blacks, Jews, and the Changing Face of the Ghetto, W.E. Pritchett described the neighborhood as a "ghetto" whose quality of life was declining by the year. The NYCHA housing encouraged the creation of an African-American and Latino population that was poorer than the Jewish population it replaced. In 1965, sociologist and then-future U.S. Senator Daniel Patrick Moynihan wrote a report about black poverty entitled The Negro Family: The Case For National Action, in which he cited the fact that the 24% of the nation's black communities were single-mother families, an attribute closely tied to poverty in these communities. At that time, Brownsville and East New York's single-mother rate was almost twice the national rate, at 45%. Backlash against the report, mainly on accusations of victim blaming, caused leaders to overlook Moynihan's proposals to improve poor black communities' quality of life, and the single-mother rate in Brownsville grew.

In 1966, black and Latino residents created the Brownsville Community Council in an effort to reverse the poverty and crime increases. The BCC secured welfare funding for 3,000 people, secure housing tenancies for 4,000 people, and voting rights for hundreds of new registrants. It closed down a block of Herzl Street for use as a play area, and it created the biweekly Brownsville Counselor newspaper to inform residents about government programs and job opportunities. However, in spite of the BCC's efforts, crime went up, with a threefold increase in reported homicides from ten in 1960 to over thirty in 1966; a doubling of arrests from 1,883 in 1956 to over 3,901 in 1966; and claims that there could actually have been more than six times as much crime than was reported. Multiple robberies of businesses were reported every day, with robbers simply lifting or bending the roll-down metal gates that protected many storefronts. City officials urged people to not use public transportation to travel to Brownsville.

Brownsville began experiencing large-scale rioting and social disorder around this time. These problems manifested themselves in September 1967. A riot occurred following the death of an 11-year-old African American boy named Richard Ross, who was killed by an African-American NYPD detective, John Rattley, at the corner of St. Johns Place and Ralph Avenue. Rattley believed Ross had mugged a 73-year-old Jewish man. The riot was led in part by Brooklyn militant Sonny Carson, who allegedly spread rumors that Rattley was white; it was quelled after Brooklyn North Borough Commander Lloyd Sealy deployed a squad of 150 police officers. Officer Rattley was not indicted by the grand jury. Then, in 1968, Brownsville was the setting of a protracted and highly contentious teachers' strike. The Board of Education had experimented with giving the people of the neighborhood control over the school. The new school administration fired several teachers in violation of union contract rules. The teachers were all white and mostly Jewish, and the resulting strike badly divided the whole city. The resulting strike dragged on for half a year, becoming known as one of John Lindsay's "Ten Plagues". It also served to segregate the remaining Jewish community from the larger black and Latino community.

By 1970, the 130,000-resident population of Brownsville was 77% black and 19% Puerto Rican. Despite the activities of black civil rights organizations such as the NAACP and Urban League whose Brooklyn chapters were based in nearby Bedford-Stuyvesant, they were, overall, less concerned with the issues of the lower-income blacks who had moved into Brownsville, thus further isolating Brownsville's population. These changes corresponded to overall increases in segregation and inequality in New York City, as well as to the replacement of blue-collar with white-collar jobs. The area gained a reputation for violence and poverty that was similar to the South Bronx's, a reputation that persisted through the 21st century.

Meanwhile, rioting and disorder continued. In June 1970, two men set fire to garbage bags to protest the New York City Department of Sanitation's reduction of trash collection pickups in Brownsville from six times to twice per week. In the riots that followed this arson, one man was killed and multiple others were injured. In May 1971, the mostly black residents of Brownsville objected to reductions in Medicaid, welfare funds, and drug prevention programs in a peaceful protest that soon turned violent. In the ensuing riot, protesters conflicted with police, with windows being broken and the New York City Fire Department fighting over 100 fires in a single night. By then, people were afraid to go out at night, yet the 400 or so white families in south Brownsville were primarily concerned about housing remaining affordable. The streets had empty storefronts, with one block of Pitkin Avenue having over two-thirds of its 16 storefronts lying vacant. In 1970, Mayor John Lindsay referred to the area, which had been the city's poorest for several years, as "Bombsville" because of its high concentration of empty lots and burned-out buildings.

=== Improvement and current status ===
After a wave of arson throughout the 1970s ravaged the low-income communities of New York City, many of the residential structures in Brownsville were left seriously damaged or destroyed, and Brownsville became synonymous for urban decay in many aspects. Even at the beginning of this arson wave, 29% of residents were impoverished, a number that would increase in later years. The city began to rehabilitate many formerly abandoned tenement-style apartment buildings and designate them low-income housing beginning in the late 1970s. Marcus Garvey Village, whose townhouse-style three-story apartment buildings had front doors and gardens, was an example of such low-income development that did not lower crime and poverty, as was intended; instead, the houses became the home base of a local gang, and poverty went up to 40%. However, the East Brooklyn Congregations' Nehemiah Housing, which also constructed buildings in East New York and Spring Creek, served to help residents find affordable housing with a good quality of life.

The neighborhood's crime rate decreased somewhat by the 1980s. Many subsidized multi-unit townhouses and newly constructed apartment buildings were built on vacant lots across the 1,200-acre (490 ha) expanse of the neighborhood, and from 2000 to 2003, applications for construction of residential buildings in Brownsville increased sevenfold. By 2015, many community organizations had been formed to improve the quality of life in parts of Brownsville. Changes included temporary markets being erected there as well as commercial developments in residential areas.

However, these improvements are limited to certain sections of Brownsville. In 2013, 39% of residents fell below the poverty line, compared to 43% in 2000, but the poverty rate of Brownsville is still relatively high, being twice the city's overall rate as well as 13% higher than that of nearby Newark, New Jersey. Brownsville families reported a median income of $15,978 as of 2008, below the United States Census poverty threshold. There is a high rate of poverty in the neighborhood's northeastern section, which is inhabited disproportionately by African-Americans and Latinos. The overall average income in Brownsville is lower than that of the rest of Brooklyn and the rest of New York City.

The reasons for Brownsville's lack of wholesale gentrification are numerous. One reporter for the magazine The Nation observed that the Los Angeles neighborhood of Pico-Union, which had a poverty rate similar to Brownsville's in 2000, had become a Businessweek "next hot neighborhood" by 2007. Brownsville had not seen a similar revitalization because, unlike Pico-Union, it had not been surrounded by gentrified neighborhoods; did not have desirable housing; and was not a historic district or an area of other significance. In addition, Brownsville is unlike similar neighborhoods in New York City that had since gentrified. The South Bronx's coastline gave way to attractions like Barretto Point Park; Bedford-Stuyvesant offered brownstone townhouses comparable to those in affluent Park Slope, Fort Greene, and Prospect Heights; and Bushwick and Greenpoint became popular places for young professional workers once Williamsburg had become highly sought due to its waterfront location and proximity to Manhattan. By contrast, Brownsville is surrounded by other high-poverty, high-crime neighborhoods like East New York, Ocean Hill, and East Flatbush. Its high concentration of public housing developments has traditionally prevented gentrification in this area. Brownsville is still majority African-American and Latino, with exactly two Jewish-owned businesses in Brownsville in 2012.

A columnist for The New York Times, writing for the paper's "Big City" section on 2012, stated that the many improvements to the city's overall quality of life, enacted by then-mayor Michael Bloomberg since 2002, "might have happened in Lithuania for all the effect they have had (or could have) on the lives of people in Brownsville." On the other hand, the area's lack of gentrification might have kept most of residents' money within the local Brownsville economy. The area's largest employer is supposedly the United States Postal Service, and the lack of mobility for many residents encourages them to buy from local stores instead. Kay Hymowitz wrote in her 2017 book, The New Brooklyn: What It Takes to Bring a City Back, that Brownsville was "the permanent ghetto" and that despite the gentrification in other Brooklyn neighborhoods, Brownsville contained a "concentrated, multigenerational black poverty" that caused its development to "remain static".

== Geography and land use ==
The total land area is 1.163 square miles (3.01 km^{2}), and the ZIP Code for the neighborhood is 11212. Although there are no official borders, Brownsville is generally bounded by East New York Avenue to the north on the Ocean Hill border; East 98th Street/Ralph Avenue to the west, bordering East Flatbush and Crown Heights; the freight rail Bay Ridge Branch of the Long Island Rail Road and Linden Boulevard to the south, adjacent to the neighborhood of Canarsie; and Van Sinderen Avenue to the east, next to East New York. It is part of Brooklyn Community Board 16, which also includes Ocean Hill.

=== Residential development ===
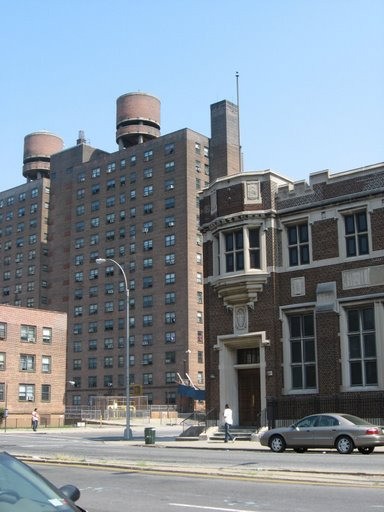
Van Dyke I Houses

As of 2008, there were a total of 28,298 housing units in Brownsville. Brownsville is dominated by public housing developments of various types, mostly in a small area bounded by Powell Street and Rockaway, Livonia, and Sutter Avenues that is composed of multiple inward-facing developments located on six superblocks. The neighborhood contains the most densely concentrated area of public housing in the United States. NYCHA owns more housing units in Brownsville than in any other neighborhood, with about one-third of the housing stock (around 10,000 units) in its 18 Brownsville developments, comprising over 100 buildings within 1 square mile (2.6 km^{2}). In 2013, it was estimated that the housing developments alone contained nearly 21,000 people. Many of these buildings were built in the mid-20th-century and are deteriorating as of 2015. Some of these NYCHA developments have been converted into RAD PACT Section 8 Developments, where, as part of a public-private partnership with NYCHA, private developers would take over the developments and provide funding for capital improvements. These conversions include Howard Avenue Houses, Seth Low Houses, Sutter Avenue-Union Houses, Tapscott Street Rehab Houses, Ralph Avenue Houses, 104-14 Tapscott Street Houses, and Lenox Road-Rockaway Parkway Houses.

Public housing developments include:

1. 104–114 Tapscott Street; one 4-story building.
2. Brownsville Houses; 27 buildings, 6- and 7 stories tall.
3. Glenmore Plaza; four buildings, 10, 18 and 24 stories tall.
4. Howard Avenue; five buildings, 3 stories tall.
5. Howard Avenue-Park Place; eight buildings, 3 stories tall.
6. Howard Houses; ten buildings, 7- and 13 stories tall.
7. Hughes Apartments; three 22-story buildings.
8. Lenox Road-Rockaway; three buildings, total 74 units.
9. Marcus Garvey (Group A); three buildings, 6 and 14 stories tall.
10. Ralph Avenue Rehab; five 4-story buildings.
11. Reverend Randolph Brown; two 6-story buildings.
12. Seth Low Houses; four buildings, 17 and 18 stories tall.
13. Sutter Avenue-Union Street; three rehabilitated tenement buildings, 4 and 6 stories tall.
14. Tapscott Street Rehab; eight 4-story rehabilitated tenement buildings.
15. Tilden Houses; eight 16-story buildings.
16. Van Dyke I; 22 buildings, 3 and 14 stories tall.
17. Van Dyke II; one 14-story building.
18. Woodson Houses; two buildings, 10 and 25 stories tall.

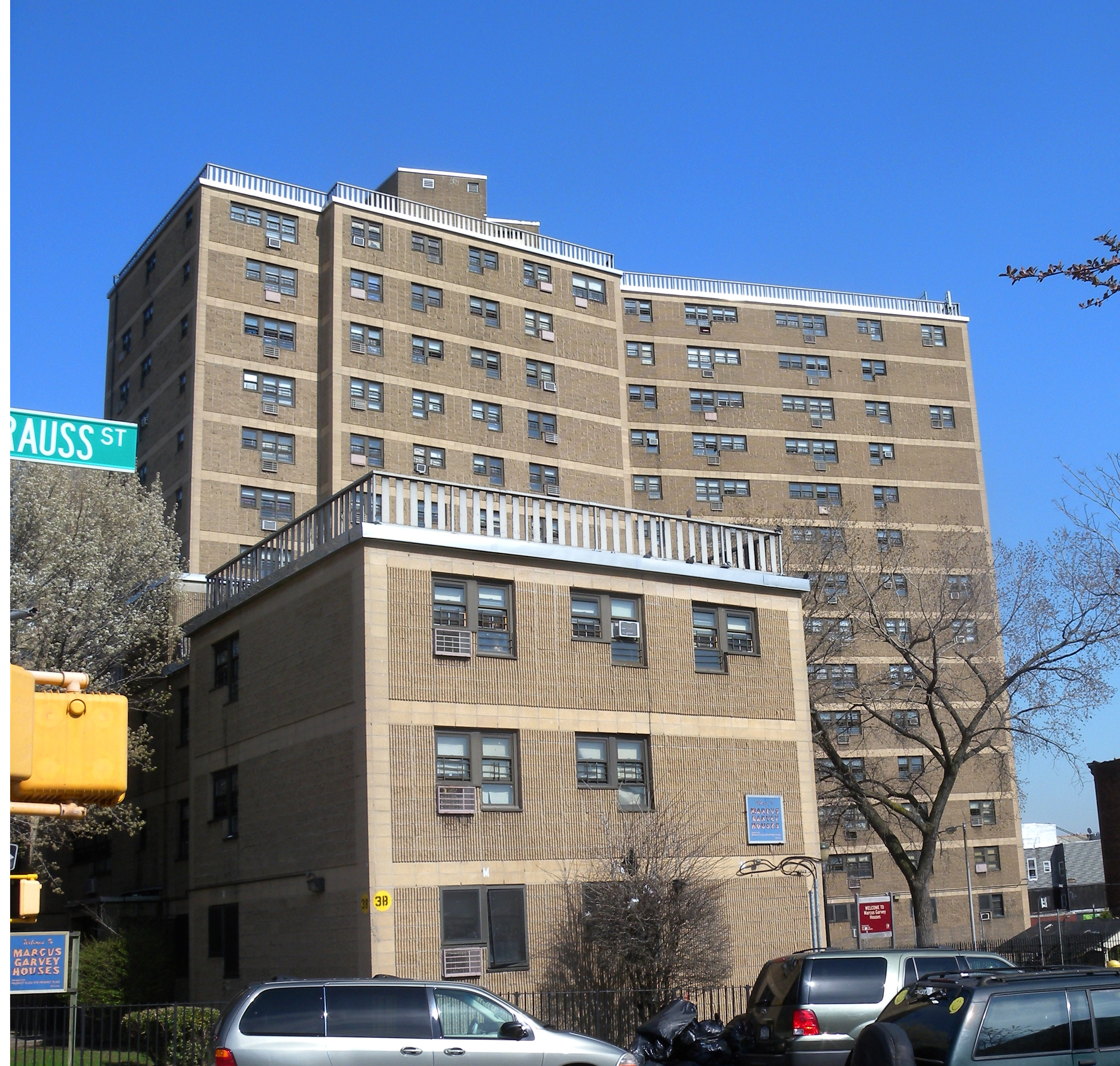
Marcus Garvey Houses

In addition, below Pitkin Avenue, there is also a significant concentration of semi-detached multi-unit row houses similar to those found in East New York and Soundview surrounding the public housing developments. Many have been torn down and replaced by vacant lots or newly constructed subsidized attached multi-unit rowhouses with gardens, driveways, and finished basements. Most of these houses were built in East New York, Ocean Hill, and Brownsville under the Nehemiah development program. Of the Nehemiah developments, most of them were built on the western half of the neighborhood. Other newly built or restored housing includes 3,871 housing units for low-income residents, as well as Noble Drew Ali Plaza, a 385-unit apartment building that was notorious for drug dealing before the New York City Department of Housing Preservation and Development (HPD) helped New York Mets first baseman Mo Vaughn buy and redevelop the building.

The Livonia Avenue Initiative, a multi-phase project situated along Livonia Avenue, is intended to create 791 apartments or houses for low-income residents. The initiative includes Livonia Commons, a proposed mixed-use project on the north side of Livonia Avenue. Livonia Commons' postmodern buildings will contain 270 apartments for lower-income citizens and 11,000 square feet (1,000 m^{2}) of commercial space at ground level. The initiative's 21,000 square feet (2,000 m^{2}) of community space will host a senior center and two concentrations of school classrooms, operated by two different groups. There would also be a gym, a swimming pool, a darkroom, and some studios. The entire Livonia Commons project would add 71,700 square feet (6,660 m^{2}) of mixed-use space in multiple buildings. As of 2016, there were 242 apartments being built, in addition to 468 affordable-housing units that had already been built in the East New York/Brownsville area.

Closer to the border with Ocean Hill, there are many limestone and brownstone townhouses in addition to tenements. In Brownsville, about 71% of rental housing is poorly maintained, more than the citywide rate of 56% and the boroughwide rate of 59%.

=== Empty lots ===
Many of Brownsville's empty lots are now gardens, which are also widespread in nearby East New York and are maintained by multiple community groups; the gardens are often planted with vegetables that could provide food for residents. The gardens were originally supposed to be temporary, filling lots that would have otherwise gone unused. After a failed sale of several abandoned lots in the 1990s that would have involved destroying some of these gardens around the city, some city residents founded the New York City Community Garden Coalition to protect these gardens.

From 2013 to 2015, NYCHA sold developers 54 lots in Brownsville, totaling 441,000 square feet (41,000 m^{2}). Some of these lots contained parks or parking lots. In December 2014 the HPD issued requests for qualifications to determine which developers could build new affordable housing on one of 91 empty HPD-owned lots in Brownsville. After controversy arose over the fact that some of these lots were actually garden sites, the HPD rescinded approval to build on 34 garden sites in Brownsville, while nine other garden sites in the area were approved for redevelopment.

=== Points of interest ===
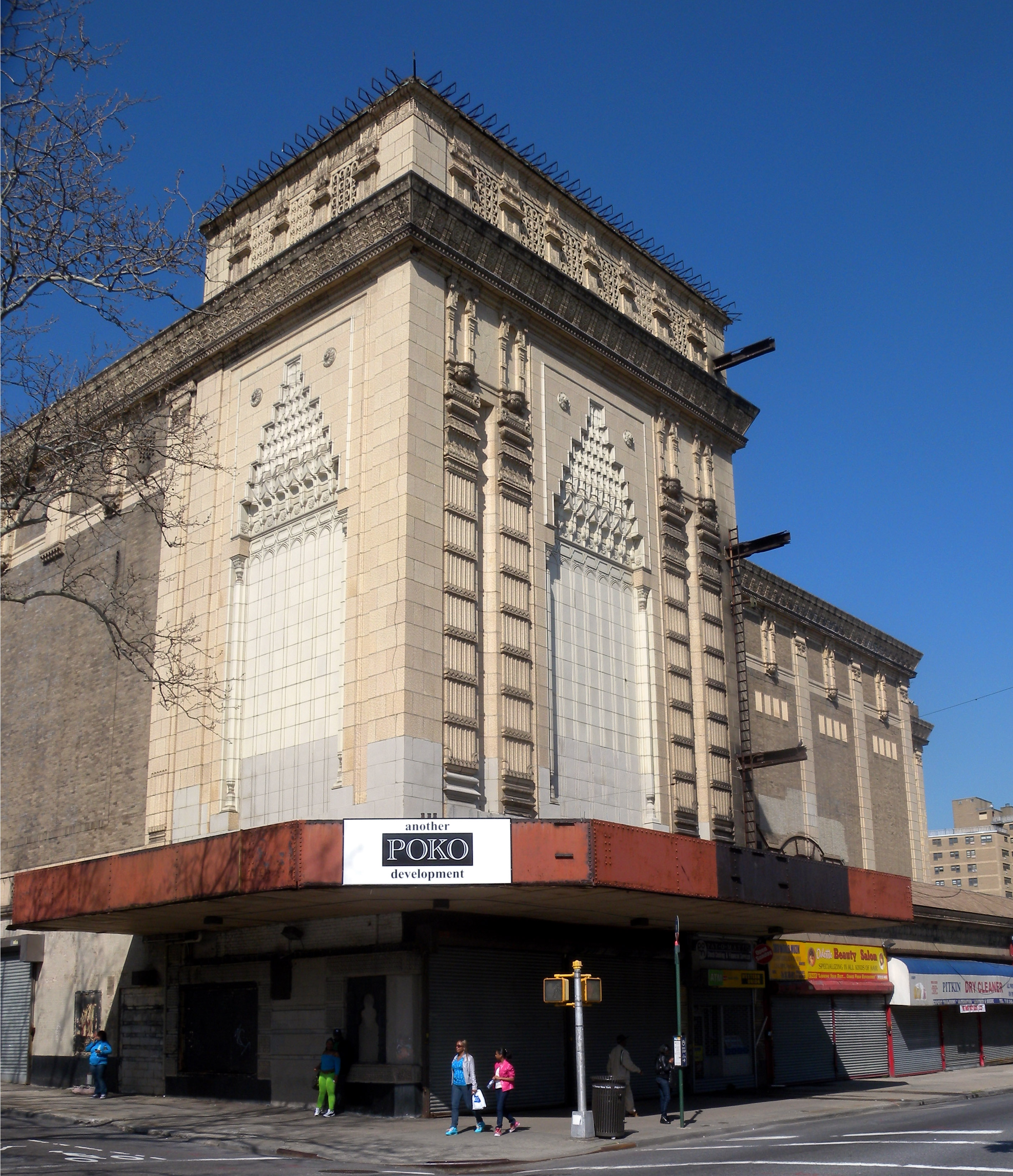
The Loews Pitkin Theatre (pictured) was abandoned for many years before being redeveloped in 2010.

The Loews Pitkin, an opulent 85-foot-high (26 m), 2,827-seat movie theater built in 1929, was among 22 theaters in the area; the rest of the theaters had either been demolished or converted into stores. The Loews Pitkin, named after theater entrepreneur Marcus Loew, had fallen in disuse by the 1970s before being revitalized in the late 2000s. The theater's decaying interior was used as a church and a furniture store before Poko Partners bought the space in 2008 and redeveloped the theater into a charter school and retail space for $43 million. The theater was renovated in response to residents' requests for more retail space, and as part of the theater's refurbishment, the charter school would open in 2012 along with 60,000 square feet (5,600 m^{2}) of retail space.

The NYPD's 65th Precinct (originally the 73rd Precinct), built in 1901, covered most of the area until its closure in the mid-1980s. The old 65th Precinct building at 1546 East New York Avenue was then sold to a family with the last name of Chen. In 2004, the Chens sold the building to Family Services Network of New York, a nonprofit organization funded by the state government. Family Services borrowed $1.1 million, but failed to pay the mortgage. Despite Family Services' grandiose $3.8 million plan to rehabilitate the 65th Precinct building into a community center, it sits derelict as of 2012, with graffiti on the walls, garbage in the interior, and jail cells still intact.

One block of Livonia Avenue from Barbey Street to Schenck Avenue is designated as "African Burial Ground Square", commemorating an African burial ground at the site that was discovered in 2010. The site contains remains similar to those found in the African Burial Ground National Monument in lower Manhattan, as well as those discovered under the former 126th Street Depot in East Harlem. As part of the designation, the Schenck Playground, behind the New Lots branch of the Brooklyn Public Library, would be rethemed with African cultural motifs and designs.

Hyman Spitz Florists, one of the businesses that dates back to Brownsville's initial settlement, was founded in 1898. It persisted at the same address, 1685 Pitkin Avenue, until 2004. Hyman Spitz Florists had helped provide flowers for such occasions as Donald and Ivana Trump's wedding.

== Demographics ==
Based on data from the 2010 United States census, the population of Brownsville was 58,300, a decrease of 799 (1.4%) from the 59,099 counted in 2000. Covering an area of 750.44 acres (303.69 ha), the neighborhood had a population density of 77.7 inhabitants per acre (49,700/sq mi; 19,200/km^{2}).

The racial makeup of the neighborhood was 76.1% (44,364) African American, 0.8% (471) White, 0.3% (165) Native American, 0.7% (416) Asian, 0.0% (18) Pacific Islander, 0.3% (180) from other races, and 1.2% (703) from two or more races. Hispanic or Latino of any race were 20.6% (11,983) of the population. 29.9% of the population were high school graduates and 8.4% had a bachelor's degree or higher.

The entirety of Community Board 16, which comprises Brownsville, had 84,525 inhabitants as of NYC Health's 2018 Community Health Profile, with an average life expectancy of 75.1 years. This is lower than the median life expectancy of 81.2 for all New York City neighborhoods. Most inhabitants are middle-aged adults and youth: 28% are between the ages of 0–17, 27% between 25 and 44, and 23% between 45 and 64. The ratio of college-aged and elderly residents was lower, at 11% and 12% respectively.

As of 2016, the median household income in Community Board 16 was $30,207. In 2018, an estimated 28% of Brownsville residents lived in poverty, compared to 21% in all of Brooklyn and 20% in all of New York City. One in seven residents (14%) were unemployed, compared to 9% in the rest of both Brooklyn and New York City. Rent burden, or the percentage of residents who have difficulty paying their rent, is 57% in Brownsville, higher than the citywide and boroughwide rates of 52% and 51% respectively. Based on this calculation, as of 2018, Brownsville is considered to be low-income relative to the rest of the city and not gentrifying.

New York City Department of City Planning showed that in the 2020 census data, there were 40,000+ Black residents and 10,000 to 19,999 Hispanic residents. Each the White and Asian populations were less than 5000 residents.

=== Jewish community ===
In the 2020s, the Jewish population in the neighborhood has increased, with a growing number of young Chabad Hasidic Jewish families moving from Crown Heights to purchase relatively affordable houses for their growing families. Property values in Crown Heights have risen significantly as result of ongoing gentrification, with median prices for homes in Brownsville at half that in Crown Heights. Brownsville Anash was opened to cater to the growing orthodox Jewish population with religious services, social services, activities, and events to accommodate their cultural and religious needs.

== Police and crime ==
The NYPD's 73rd Precinct is located at 1470 East New York Avenue. NYCHA property in the area is patrolled separately by Police Service Area #2 (P.S.A. 2).

Brownsville has consistently been considered the murder capital of New York City, with the 73rd Precinct ranking 69th safest out of 69 city precincts for per-capita crime in 2009. That year, there were 3 murders per 10,000 residents (higher than in any other neighborhood in the city), making for 28 overall murders in Brownsville; in overall crime, the 73rd Precinct was the 66th safest out of 69 neighborhoods. In the 15 years between 1990 and 2005, reports of murder in Brownsville–Ocean Hill dropped 63 percent (to 22 murders in 2005); robberies 79 percent (to 597 in 2005); and felony assaults decreased 51 percent (to 562 in 2005). Crime rates in Brownsville had declined in the same manner that they had elsewhere in the city, but the declines were not as dramatic as in other areas of the city, with 72 people shot and 15 killed in Brownsville in 2013. With an incarceration rate of 1,698 per 100,000 residents, Brownsville's incarceration rate is three times the city's as a whole and higher than every other neighborhood's incarceration rate. At a non-fatal assault rate of 175 per 100,000 people, Brownsville also sees the most violent crimes per capita out of any neighborhood in the city. By contrast, Morrisania, a Bronx neighborhood that once had a crime rate as high as Brownsville's, saw its crime rate decline by 25 percent between 1998 and 2011, while Brownsville's crime rate stayed roughly even during the same time period. In 2025, the rate of violent crime in Brownsville, about 10 per 1,000 residents, was about double the rate for the entire city.

The social problems associated with poverty, from crime to drug addiction, have plagued the area for decades. Despite the decline of crime compared to its peak during the crack and heroin epidemics, violent crime continues to be a serious problem in the community, especially gang-related gun violence. Empty lots and unused storefronts are common in Brownsville due to high rates of crime, mostly in the area's public housing developments. A reporter for The New York Times observed that some of the area's playgrounds were inadequately maintained with broken lights and unlocked gates, and that shootings were common in these public housing developments. Brownsville was so dangerous that one UPS driver, robbed at gunpoint, needed an armed security guard to accompany him while delivering packages to houses in the neighborhood. In an effort to reduce crime, the NYPD started a stop-and-frisk program in the early 2000s; this was controversial especially in Brownsville, with 93% of residents in one eight-block area reportedly being stopped and frisked (compared to a 7% rate citywide). However, serious crime per resident is decreasing, and from 2000 to 2011, the rate dropped from 45.0 to 35.3 serious crimes per 1,000 residents.

== Fire safety ==
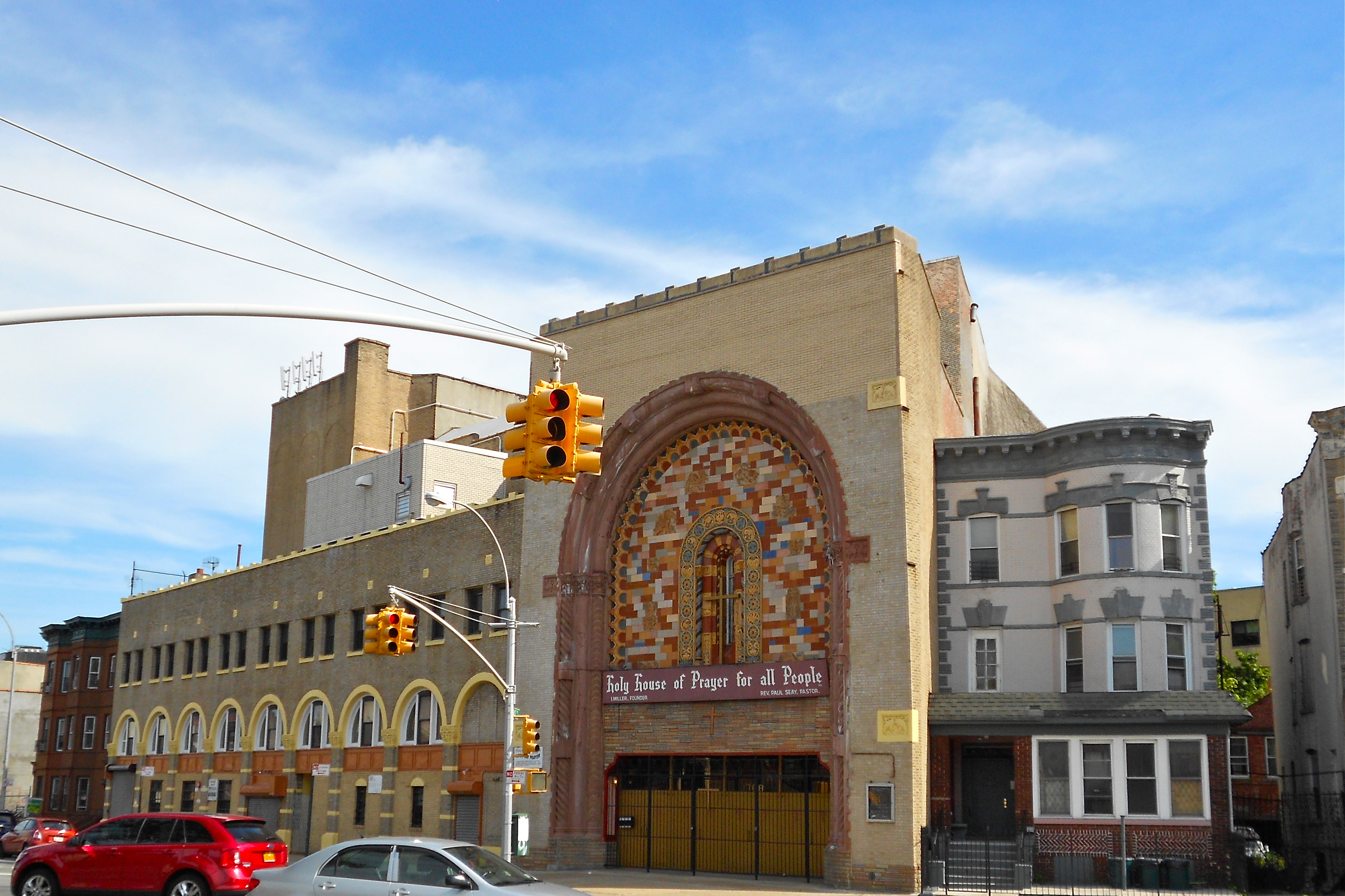
Parkway Theatre, now a church

The firehouse for the New York City Fire Department (FDNY)'s Engine Company 231/Ladder Company 120/Battalion 44 is located in Brownsville. Engine Company 283/Division 15's quarters are also located in Brownsville.

A 21,000-square-foot (2,000 m^{2}), $32 million FDNY facility was completed at 1815 Sterling Place in 2019. Designed by Chicago-based architectural firm Studio Gang, the new facility is both an FDNY training center and the firehouse for Rescue Company 2. Ground broke on the project in July 2016. The new firehouse, announced in December 2015, replaced Rescue 2's old location, a small building at 1472 Bergen Street in Crown Heights, which was built in the 1920s and had been occupied by Rescue 2 since 1985.

== Parks, open spaces, and recreation ==
=== Parks ===
Just east of the Crown Heights–Utica Avenue subway station, on the border with Crown Heights, there is a park called Lincoln Terrace (also known as Arthur S. Somers Park), which slopes gently down toward the southern Brooklyn coastline. The New Lots Line transitions from a tunnel to an elevated structure within this park. The 21 acres (8.5 ha) of land for Lincoln Terrace was purchased by the city in 1895–1897. In order to deter aircraft from flying through the area during World War I, parts of the park had turrets installed in "serviceable but inconspicuous locations" in 1918. Through 1935, additional land was added to the park (including land purchased from the Interborough Rapid Transit Company in 1928, which had built its New Lots Line in 1920). Streets were closed to make room for the extra parkland. The park was originally named after Abraham Lincoln, but in 1932, the western section of the park (west of Rockaway Parkway) was renamed after activist Arthur S. Somers, an area resident who had died that year. Around that time, the park and playgrounds were refurbished.

Betsy Head Park is located in a lot on the north side of Livonia Avenue bounded by Strauss Street and Thomas S. Boyland Street. Opened in 1915, it is named after Betsy Head, a rich Briton, who died in 1907. In 1936, a new Olympic-size swimming pool, one of 11 across the city, was added as part of a Works Progress Administration project. In 2008, the New York City Landmarks Preservation Commission designated the Betsy Head Play Center as the first individual city landmark in Brownsville.

At Livonia Avenue and Powell Street, Livonia Park is named after Livonia, in the Baltic region in what is now Latvia and Estonia. Livonia Avenue itself is so named for the same reason. According to the New York City Department of Parks and Recreation, the park honors Livonia and its native people, the Livonians. The Livonians were never fully independent, instead being alternatively led by the Teutonic Order, Sweden, and the Russian Empire. The Kingdom of Livonia was a nominal state of Russia from 1570 to 1578 during the Livonian War, but did not actually gain independence. Eventually, the Livonians were assimilated into the larger Latvian population, keeping parts of their language and a few other cultural vestiges. The Russian Empire became communist as part of the October Revolution in 1917, and Latvia and Estonia gained independence soon after, only to become part of communist Russia again until the collapse of the Soviet Union in 1991. The park itself was designated on August 15, 1969, as part of NYCHA's development of the Tilden Houses. There are trees, benches, gaming spaces, a drinking fountain, and many grassy plots within the park. The red-and-white bricks in Livonia Park feature the colors of the Latvian flag.

=== Recreation ===
Brownsville also has its own recreation facility with indoor swimming pools, outdoor athletic fields, and a playground. The Brownsville Recreation Center at the corner of Linden Boulevard, Mother Gaston Boulevard, and Christopher Avenue. Like all other indoor pools in the city, the Brownsville Recreation Center requires a NYC Parks pool membership. It was opened in 1953 as the Brownsville Boys' Club, a "one-room clubhouse" affiliated with the Boys & Girls Clubs of America. Over the next two years, the club raised $1.5 million in funds, and the city opened a brand-new recreation facility. Improvements were made to the center in the late 1990s and 2000s, including $265,000 of general repairs in 1996; $400,000 of heat and air conditioning refurbishments in 1998; and a $1.5 million renovation in 2008 that entailed installing a new playground, improving amenities such as benches and lighting, and replacing the athletic field with artificial turf.

The "Soul in the Hole" is a famous basketball court in Brownsville. The Hole is known for street basketball, and the New York Daily News characterizes it as having the "toughest" streetball competition in Brooklyn. It is located in the Brownsville Houses along Rockaway Avenue between Riverdale and Livonia Avenues. Famous players who played there included Fly Williams.

=== Other open spaces ===
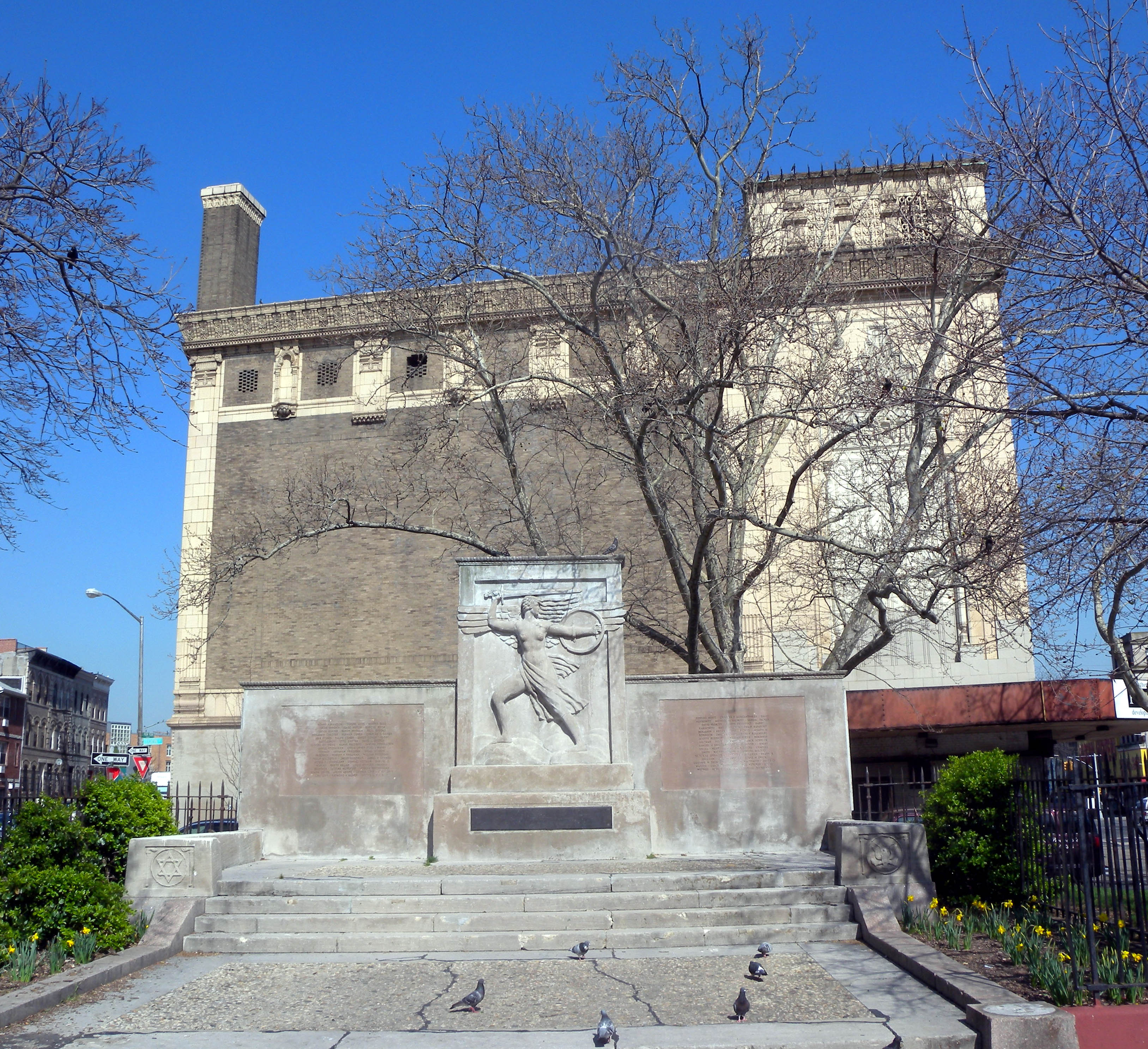
Zion Triangle

The traffic triangle bounded by Pitkin and East New York Avenues and Legion Street was originally named Vanderveer Park after Peter L. Vandeveer, the former owner of the land constituting that triangle. Vanderveer donated the land in 1896, and in 1911, it was renamed Zion Park in recognition of the Jewish community. The Zion Park War Memorial, a monumental wall based on a design by sculptor Charles Cary Rumsey and architect Henry Beaumont Herts, was installed in the triangle and dedicated in 1925. During the 1970s, the monument was heavily vandalized, but it was restored and cleaned up by the 1990s. This monument features a star of David. The bas relief sculptures are mounted on a limestone stele and side pylons.

The Wyckoff Triangle, bounded by New Lots, Riverdale, and Van Siclen Avenues, is named after local property owner Hendrick Wyckoff, who ceded the land used for the traffic triangle. During the American Revolutionary War, Wyckoff was a spy for the colonists rebelling against the British. Through the 1920s, Wyckoff's family maintained the park, which is now privately maintained because it is too small to be a NYC Parks public space.

== Politics and government ==
Brownsville is a heavily Democratic area; in the 2012 presidential campaign, President Barack Obama "won what was very close to a unanimous vote" in the neighborhood.

The neighborhood is part of New York's 9th congressional district, represented by Democrat Yvette Clarke as of 2013. It is also part of the 20th State Senate district, represented by Democrat Zellnor Myrie, and the 55th State Assembly district, represented by Democrat Latrice Walker. Brownsville is located in New York's 41st City Council district, represented by Democrat Darlene Mealy.

In the 2016 Democratic presidential primary, Hillary Rodham Clinton received 4,889 votes (73.9%) to Bernie Sanders's 1,729 votes (26.1%). Brownsville had very few Republican primary voters: just 40 Brownsville voters cast ballots in the 2016 Republican primary.

== Health care ==
Brownsville suffers from major health disparities in comparison to the rest of New York City. In 2006, Brownsville had the highest infant mortality rate in New York City (12.5 per 1,000 births), twice the overall city rate (5.9 per 1,000 births). As of 2018, preterm births and births to teenage mothers were also more common in Brownsville than in other places citywide. In Brownsville, there were 127 preterm births per 1,000 live births (compared to 87 per 1,000 citywide), and 31.2 births to teenage mothers per 1,000 live births (compared to 20.2 per 1,000 citywide). In 2015, Brownsville had the lowest average life span (74.1 years) of any New York City neighborhood; the average life span in 2018 was 75.1 years, significantly lower than the city's median life span. A New York City Department of Health and Mental Hygiene community health profile the next year found that in Brownsville, the average life expectancy is more than ten years shorter than in Manhattan's Financial District. Brownsville has a high population of residents who are uninsured, or who receive healthcare through Medicaid. In 2018, this population of uninsured residents was estimated to be 12%, which is equal to the citywide rate.

Air pollution in Brownsville is 0.008 milligrams per cubic metre (8.0×10^{−9} oz/ft^{3}), higher than the citywide and boroughwide averages. Seventeen percent of Brownsville residents are smokers, which is slightly higher than the city average of 14% of residents being smokers. In Brownsville, 41% of residents are obese, 13% are diabetic, and 33% have high blood pressure—compared to the citywide averages of 24%, 11%, and 28% respectively. In addition, 23% of children are obese, higher than the citywide average of 20%.

Eighty percent of residents eat some fruits and vegetables every day, which is lower than the city's average of 87%. In 2018, 79% of residents described their health as "good", "very good", or "excellent", slightly more than the city's average of 78%. For every supermarket in Brownsville, there are 15 bodegas.

Brookdale University Hospital and Medical Center is located in the neighborhood. The hospital has suffered from violence; in 2014, the federal Occupational Safety and Health Administration issued a citation to the hospital for "willful" failure to protect hospital employees after an extensive series of incidents of violence against hospital workers took place.

Brownsville has one of the highest rates of psychiatric hospitalization in the city, with 1,727 such hospitalizations per 100,000 adults.

The area has also historically suffered from high levels of childhood lead exposure from environmental lead, particularly from lead-based paint in dilapidated housing stock.

== Education ==
Brownsville has significantly high dropout rates in its schools. Brownsville also has one of the highest concentrations of "persistently violent" schools of any area in New York State, with five such schools in Brownsville and East New York on the 2015–2016 list of most dangerous schools. (Note: These schools are Brownsville Collaborative Middle School, East New York Elementary School of Excellence, East New York Middle School of Excellence, PS 150 Christopher, and PS 213 New Lots.) Students must pass through metal detectors and swipe ID cards to enter the buildings. This arose from two school shootings in East New York in 1991–1992 that, combined, resulted in the deaths of three students and the injury of one teacher. Other problems in local schools include low test scores, with 95% of students scoring below grade level on state tests.

Brownsville generally has a lower ratio of college-educated residents than the rest of the city as of 2018. While 21% of residents have a college education or higher, 27% have less than a high school education and 52% are high school graduates or have some college education. By contrast, 40% of Brooklynites and 38% of city residents have a college education or higher. The percentage of Brownsville students excelling in reading and math has been increasing, with reading achievement rising from 26 percent in 2000 to 31 percent in 2011, and math achievement rising from 20 percent to 38 percent within the same time period.

Brownsville has the second-highest rate of student homelessness in Brooklyn. It also has the highest rate of elementary school student absenteeism in New York City, with 39 percent of Brownsville elementary school students missing twenty or more days per school year. Additionally, 65% of high school students in Brownsville graduate on time, less than the citywide average of 75%. As a result, Brownsville's average educational attainment rates were low compared to the rest of the city, with few students continuing to college.

=== Schools ===
Public schools are operated by the New York City Department of Education. Due to the area's high population density, there are 39 public and charter schools serving elementary and middle school students in Brownsville. Numbered public primary schools include P.S. 150 Christopher; P.S. 156 Waverly; P.S. 165 Ida Posner; P.S. 184 Newport; P.S. 189 Lincoln Terrace; P.S. 219 Kennedy-King; P.S. 284 Lew Wallace; P.S. 298; P.S. 327 Dr Rose B English; P.S. 332 Charles H Houston School; I.S. 392; P.S. 396 Special Education School; P.S. 398 Walter Weaver; P.S. 41 Francis White; P.S. 770 New American Academy; and P.S/I.S. 323 Elementary School. Until 2008, the neighborhood was also served by P.S. 183, the Daniel Chappie James Elementary School.

There are three high schools in Brownsville; two are housed in the same building at 226 Bristol Street. Teachers Preparatory opened in September 2001, while Frederick Douglass Academy VII opened in September 2004. Teachers Preparatory School serves 6th through 12th graders with 99% minority enrollment, receiving a grade of "A" on both its middle school and high school report cards for 2008. FDA VII serves 9th through 12th grades with 99% minority enrollment. The third high school is Brownsville Academy, which is a Diploma Plus transfer school serving 10th through 12th grades with a 100% minority enrollment. It received a "Well Developed" score for 2008–2009. It also received a grade of B on its 2007–2008 report card. Brownsville Academy, a relatively small school with 205 students as of 2016–2017, is located at 1150 East New York Avenue, close to the Crown Heights border.

=== Libraries ===
The Brooklyn Public Library (BPL) has two branches in Brownsville. The Brownsville branch is located on 61 Glenmore Avenue, near Watkins Street. It opened in 1905 and used a second-floor space of another building. The current 10,550-square-foot (980 m^{2}) branch opened in 1908.

The Stone Avenue branch is located at 581 Mother Gaston Boulevard. When it opened in 1914 as the Brownsville Children's Library, it was among the world's first children's libraries, as well as one of the last Carnegie libraries in Brooklyn. The branch was renovated in 2014.

== Transportation ==
=== Public transportation ===
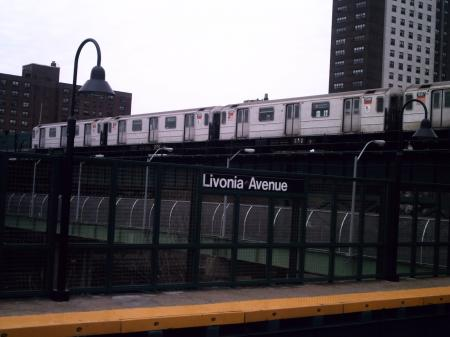
The crossing of the New York City Subway's New Lots Line and Canarsie Line

The area is well-served by public transport. The New York City Subway serves Brownsville on the IRT New Lots Line (34 train) and BMT Canarsie Line (L train). The New Lots Line from Saratoga Avenue to Junius Street is definitely in Brownsville; additionally, the New Lots Line's Sutter Avenue–Rutland Road station and the Canarsie Line from Atlantic Avenue to New Lots Avenue are located along the neighborhood's borders with East Flatbush and East New York, respectively. Due to the lines being created by two different, competing subway companies (the Interborough Rapid Transit Company and the Brooklyn Rapid Transit Company, respectively), a direct transit connection does not exist between the two lines, although a free out-of-system transfer does exist. A pedestrian bridge from the Livonia Avenue station on the Canarsie Line spans west across the Long Island Rail Road's Bay Ridge Branch to Junius Street, where an entrance to that street's station along the New Lots Line is less than a block away. There are proposals to convert the overpass into a free-transfer passage between the two stations, due to increasing ridership and plans for additional housing in the area. Money is allocated in the Metropolitan Transportation Authority's 2015–2019 Capital Program to build this transfer. The stations would also need to be upgraded to become compliant with mobility accessibility guidelines under the Americans with Disabilities Act of 1990.

MTA Regional Bus Operations operates bus lines in the area. The B15 bus crosses Brownsville horizontally, for the most part using New Lots Avenue; the B14 bus uses Pitkin and Sutter Avenues through its route in the area where Brownsville overlaps with East New York. North–south bus lines include the B7 on Saratoga Avenue and Thomas S Boyland Street and the B60 on Rockaway Avenue. The B8, B35, and B47 have segments along the outer borders of Brownsville, and the B8 and B35 both terminate along Hegeman Avenue in the neighborhood's southwestern portion.

In 2011, 72% of residents used public transportation, up from 66% in 2000. More than 85% of residents live within 0.5 miles (0.80 km) of the subway.

=== Streets ===
The street grid aligns with the general East New York street grid, which contains streets that generally run north–south, though ten streets from the slightly diagonal street grid of Canarsie extend into Brownsville. The easternmost of these streets, East 98th Street, serves as the ending point for many main thoroughfares in central Brooklyn, including Church Avenue, Kings Highway, and Sutter Avenues.

As a result of its Jewish heritage, there are several streets named after Jewish community figures in the western portion of Brownsville. In 1913, nine years after writer Theodor Herzl died, residents successfully petitioned to rename Ames Street to Herzl Street, marking one of the few streets outside Israel that are named Herzl Street. One block away, the incorrectly spelled Strauss Street was named after two former Macy's co-owners, brothers Nathan and Isidor Straus, the latter of whom died when his wife Ida gave up a seat on a lifeboat off the sinking RMS Titanic.

One of Brownsville's main thoroughfares, Pitkin Avenue, is named after businessman John R. Pitkin of Connecticut. Pitkin developed East New York starting in 1835.

Hopkinson Street, originally named after Declaration of Independence signer Francis Hopkinson, was renamed in honor of State Assemblyman Thomas S. Boyland, who served the neighborhood from 1977 until his death in 1982. Incidentally, many places in Brownsville, including two schools and a housing development, are named after Boyland and two of his family members (his brother William F. Boyland Sr. and his nephew William Boyland Jr.), who also went into politics and represented Brownsville in various levels of local government.

Stone Avenue was renamed after Rosetta Gaston (1895–1981), founder of the Brownsville Heritage House on the avenue, as Mother Gaston Boulevard after her death. Mother Gaston, as she was called, operated the Heritage House inside the Stone Avenue Library, a Jacobean Revival-style library built in 1914 by William Tubby.

== In popular culture ==
The 1934 novel Call It Sleep, by Henry Roth, is about the Schearl family, who moves from Brownsville back to the Lower East Side. The main character, young David Schearl, must endure the "terror of poverty" on the Lower East Side. Brownsville, by contrast, is described in the book as a vast improvement over the Lower East Side. In addition, Alfred Kazin wrote about 1920s-era Brownsville in his memoir A Walker in the City.

== Notable people ==
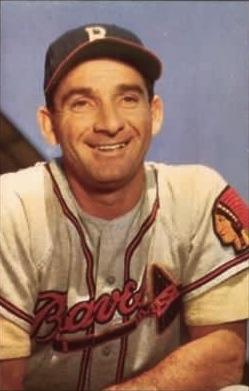
Sid Gordon

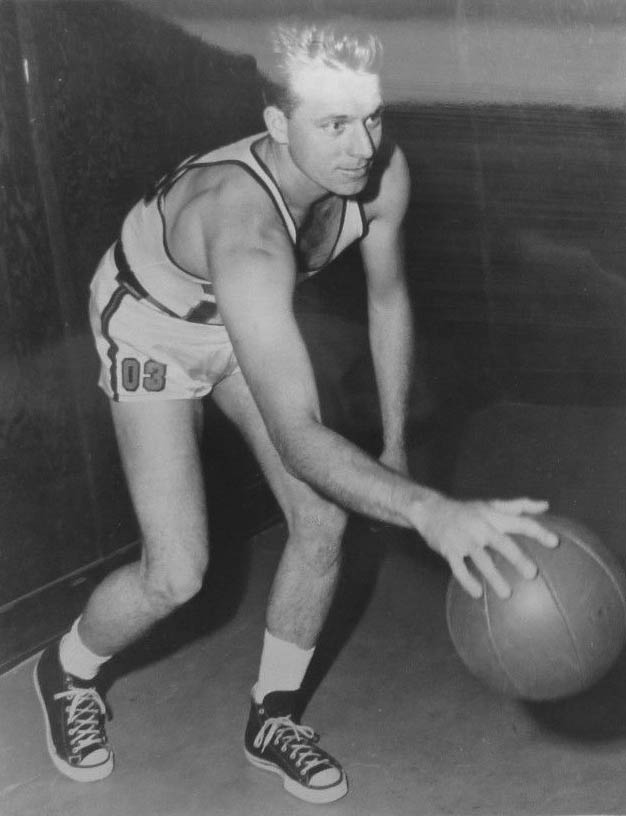
Red Holzman

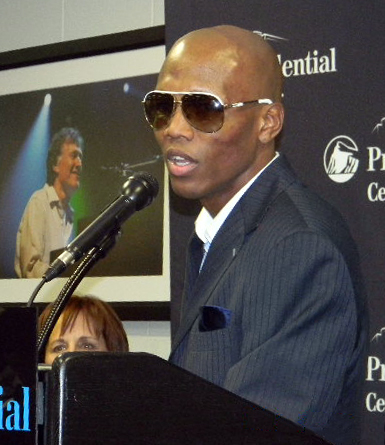
Zab Judah

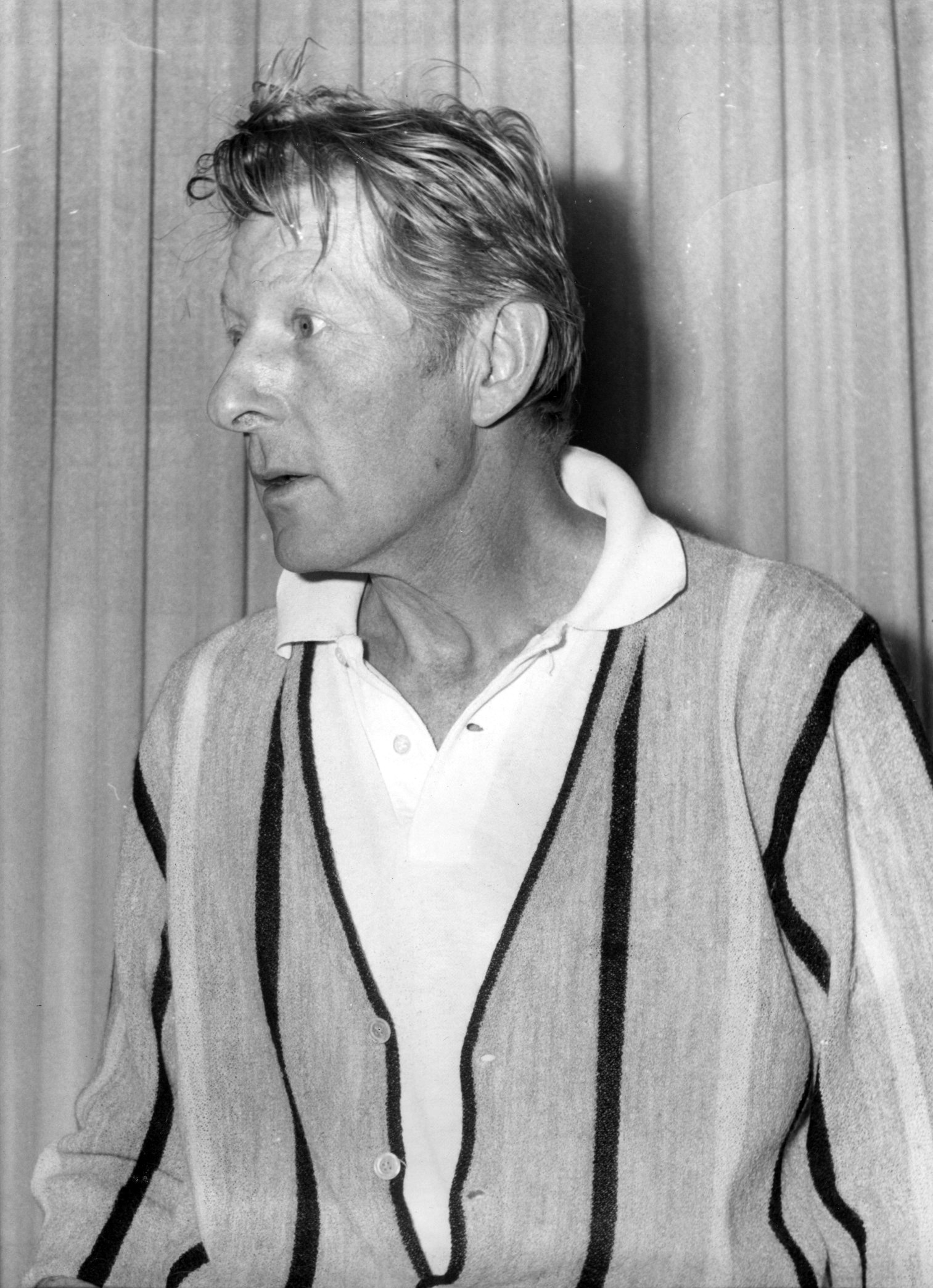
Danny Kaye

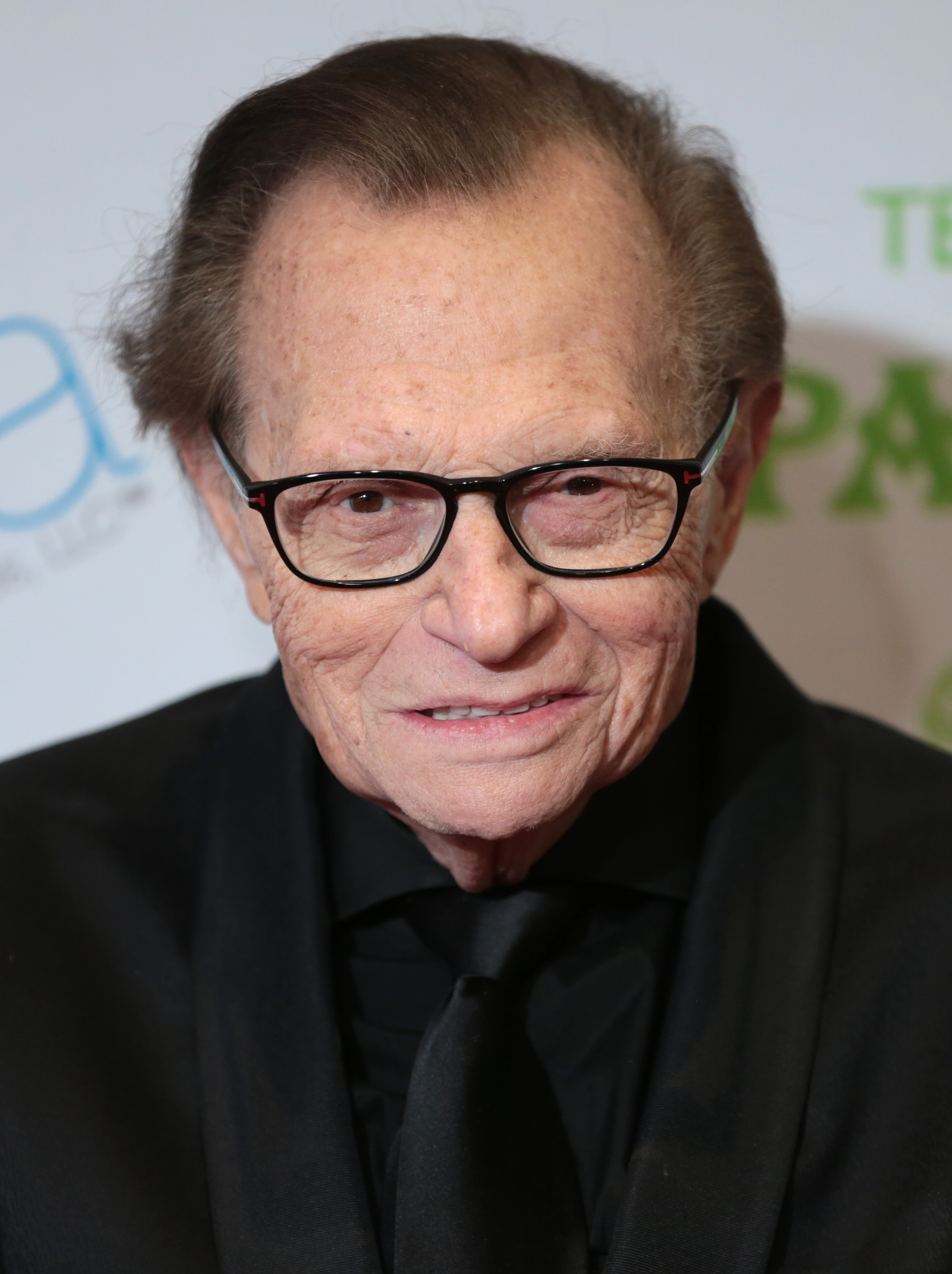
Larry King

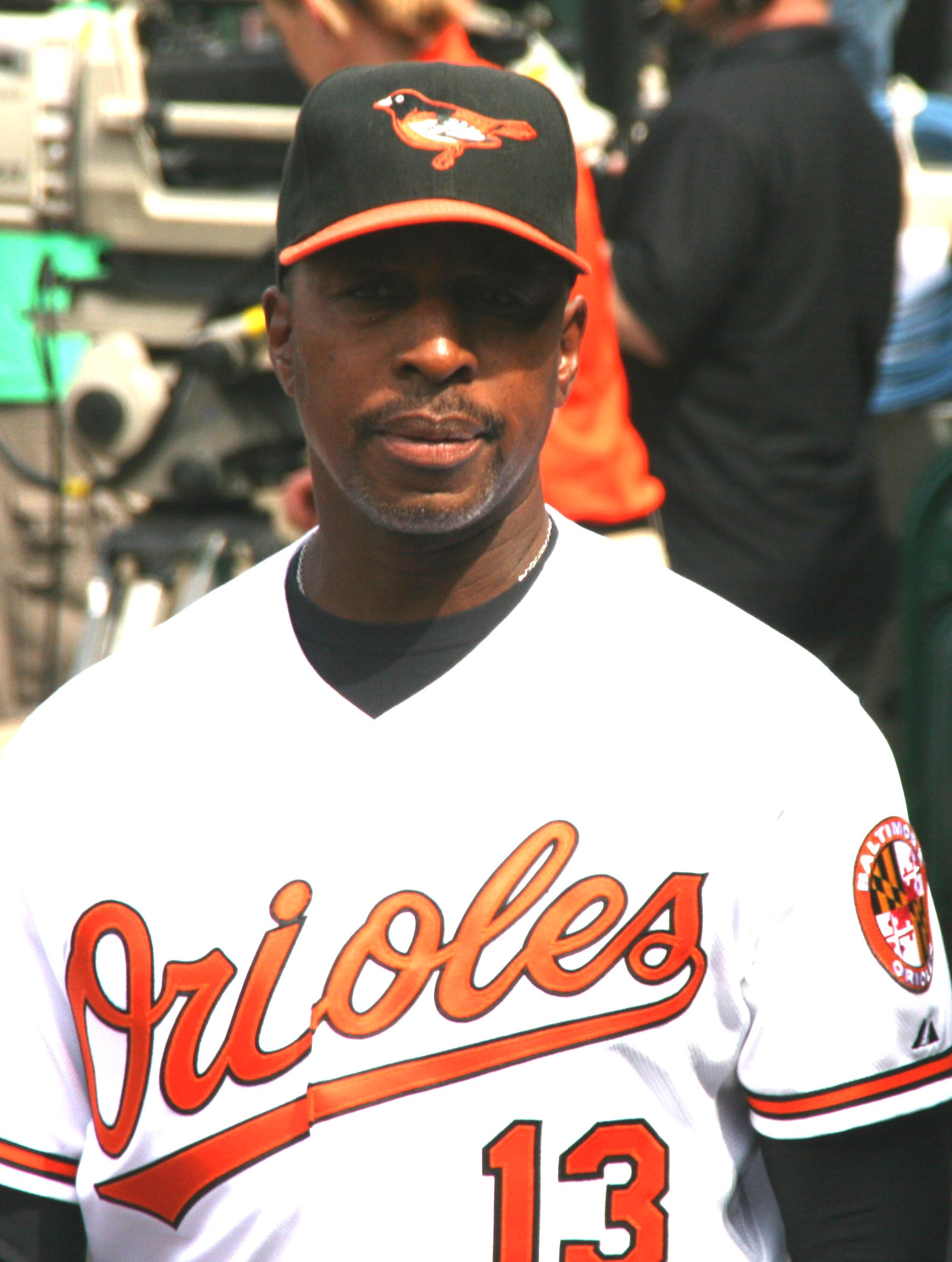
Willie Randolph

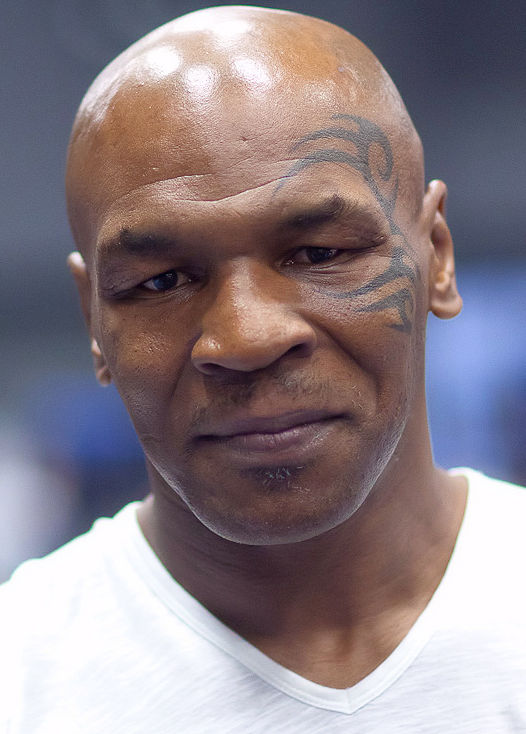
Mike Tyson

- Masta Ace (born 1966), rapper
- Lyle Alzado (1949–1992), NFL All Pro defensive tackle
- Albert Anastasia (1902–1957), mobster
- Maurice Ashley (born 1966), chess grandmaster
- Eric Adams (born 1960), 110th mayor of New York City from 2022 to 2025
- Ralph Bakshi (born 1938), film director
- Daniel Benzali (born 1950), Golden-Globe nominated actor
- Christopher Bouzy (born 1975), tech entrepreneur and founder of Bot Sentinel
- Riddick Bowe (born 1967), boxer
- Harry Boykoff (1922–2001), NBA basketball player
- Shannon Briggs (born 1971), boxer
- Egbert B. Brown (1816–1902), Union general
- Andrew Dice Clay (born 1957), comedian
- Mickey Cohen (1913–1976), gangster
- Aaron Copland (1900–1990), composer
- Bummy Davis (1920–1945), boxer
- Vince Edwards (1928–1996), actor
- Melech Epstein (1889–1979), journalist and historian
- Meade Esposito (1907–1993), Brooklyn Democratic leader
- Fyvush Finkel (1922–2016), actor
- Max Fleischer (1883–1972), animator
- Brian Flores (born 1982), NFL coach
- John Forté (born 1975), rapper
- World B. Free (born 1953), former NBA player
- Bernie Friedkin (1917–2007), professional boxer who competed in the lightweight division
- Nelson George (born 1957), author
- Marty Glickman (1917–2001), sportscaster
- Don Goldstein (1937–2022), All American and Pan American champion basketball player
- Sid Gordon (1917–1975), two-time All Star baseball player
- Solomon Grayzel (1896–1980), historian
- Arnold Greenberg (1932–2012), co-founder of Snapple
- Yoel Halpern (1904–1986), rabbi
- Larry Harlow (1939–2021), salsa music performer, composer, and producer
- Henry Hill (1943–2012), mobster associated with the Vario Crew and Lucchese crime family
- Red Holzman (1920–1998), NBA Hall of Fame player and coach
- Moe (1897–1975), Curly (1903–1952), and Shemp Howard (1895–1955), who were brothers and members of The Three Stooges
- Thirstin Howl the 3rd, rapper
- Gregory "Jocko" Jackson (1952–2012), community leader and NBA player
- Daniel Jacobs (born 1987), boxer
- Charles Jenkins (born 1989), NBA player
- Zab Judah (born 1977), boxer
- Ka (1972–2024), rapper
- Donald Kagan (1932–2021), historian
- Big Daddy Kane, rapper
- Danny Kaye (1911–1987), entertainer
- Alfred Kazin (1915–1998), writer and literary critic
- Larry King (1933–2021), television and radio host
- Alvin Klein (c. 1938 – 2009), theater critic for The New York Times
- Meyer Lansky (1902–1983), noted underworld figure
- Steve Lawrence (born 1935), singer
- Thomas A. LaVeist (born 1961), Dean of Tulane University School of Public Health & Tropical Medicine
- Leonard Marsh (1933–2013), co-founder of Snapple
- Zero Mostel (1915–1977), actor
- M.O.P., hip hop duo
- Eddie Mustafa Muhammad (born 1952), former boxer
- Alex B. Novikoff (1913–1987), cell biologist
- O.G.C., hip hop group
- Abraham Osheroff (1915–2008), political activist
- Joseph Papp (1921–1991), theatrical producer/director
- Norman Podhoretz, writer
- Sean Price (1972–2015), rapper
- Isidor Isaac Rabi (1898–1988), physicist and 1944 Nobel Prize Laureate for his discovery of nuclear magnetic resonance
- Paul Rand (1914–1996), graphic designer
- Willie Randolph (born 1954), former baseball player, manager, and coach
- Abe Reles (1906–1941), mobster
- Representativz, hip hop duo
- Robert Rosen (1934–1998), theoretical biologist
- RZA, rapper, member of the Wu-Tang Clan
- Meyer Schapiro (1904–1996), art historian, member of the faculty of Columbia University for 45 years
- Phil Sellers (1953–2023), former NBA player
- Al Sharpton (born 1954), minister
- Allie Sherman (1923–2015), National Football League player and head coach
- Amote Sias, educator and activist
- Phil Silvers, comic
- Heltah Skeltah, hip hop group
- Jimmy Smits, actor
- Bern Nadette Stanis, actress
- Smif-N-Wessun, hip hop duo
- Sparky D (born 1965), MC & rapper
- Joe Tacopina (born 1966), criminal defense attorney
- Sid Tanenbaum (1925–1986), professional basketball player
- Mel Taylor (1933–1996), longtime drummer, percussionist and member of the instrumental and surf-rock band The Ventures
- Herb Turetzky (1945–2022), official scorer for the Brooklyn Nets for 54 years, including all of its incarnations, starting with the franchise's inaugural game in 1967
- Mike Tyson (born 1966), boxer
- Dwayne "Pearl" Washington (1964–2016), late professional basketball player
- Allen Weisselberg (born 1947), businessman and chief financial officer of The Trump Organization
- Fly Williams (born 1953), former NBA player
- Otis Wilson (born 1957), former NFL linebacker
- Terry Winters (born 1949), artist
- Max Zaslofsky (1925–1985), professional basketball player and coach
- Howard Zinn (1922–2010), historian
