= Seth Low Houses =

Public housing development in Brooklyn, New York

- NYCHA property
- Nickname: Low Houses
- Location within New York City
- Coordinates: 40.6689382°N 73.9044224°W
- Country: United States
- State: New York
- City: New York City
- Borough: Brooklyn
- ZIP codes: 11233
- Area codes: 718, 347, 929, and 917

The Seth Low Houses is a public housing complex built and operated by the New York City Housing Authority (NYCHA), located in Brownsville, Brooklyn. The development is named after Seth Low (1850–1916), a former city mayor who attacked the existence of unsanitary tenements. Low Houses has four buildings that are 17 and 18 stories tall, each with 535 apartments. It was completed on December 31, 1967, with a total area of 5.89-acres. The Low Houses is considered one of Brooklyn's toughest projects and have been known for shootings and gang violence throughout the years.

== In Process To Be Converted Into Section 8 RAD PACT Program ==
In 2016, there were announcements of converting some of the NYCHA developments into Section 8 RAD PACT Management where private companies will manage the developments in a Public-private partnership. This move aims to bring in the capital funding needed to make necessary repairs and upgrades to the developments. Seth Low Houses was included in this plan as well and is currently under progress to be converted into this program.

== See also ==
- New York City Housing Authority
