= Marcus Garvey Houses =

Public housing development in Brooklyn, New York

- NYCHA Property
- Garvey (Group A) Houses
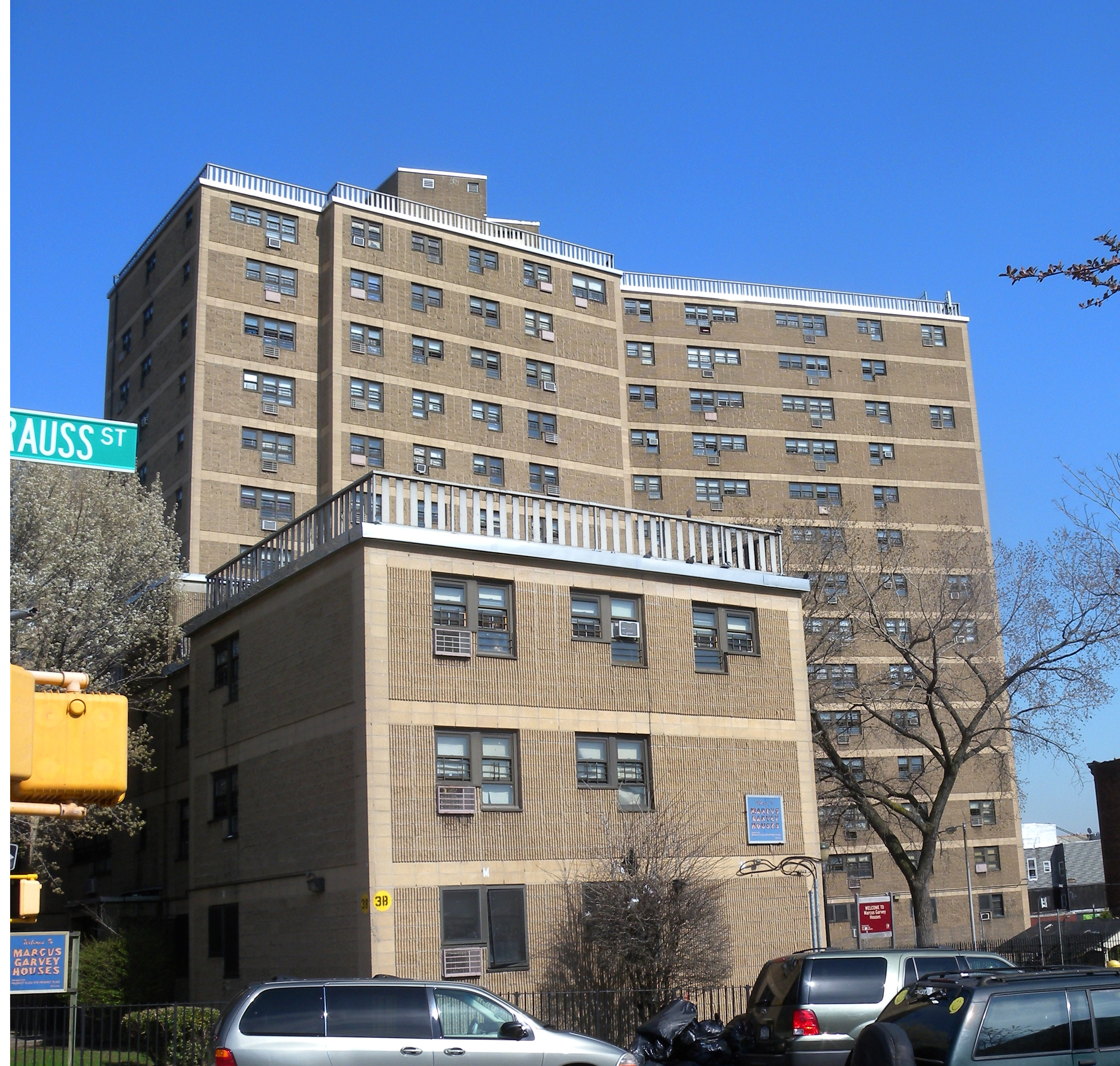
- Interactive map of Marcus Garvey Houses
- Country: United States
- State: New York
- City: New York City
- Borough: Brooklyn

Area
  - Total: 3.38 acres (1.37 ha)

Population
  - Total: 793
- Zip Code: 11212

The Marcus Garvey Houses (also called Garvey (Group A) Houses) is a NYCHA housing project that consists of three residential buildings. Building I has 6 stories while buildings II and III both with 14 stories with a shorter 3 story part in the front at East New York Avenue. It is located between East New York and Pitkin Avenues and also between Strauss to Thomas S. Boyland Streets in Brownsville, Brooklyn. It was named after Jamaican political activist Marcus Garvey.

== History ==
This housing project was completed in February 1975.

=== 21st century ===
In 2013, The New York Times reported that the residence had become a drug- and gang-related crime hotspot.

Somewhere in the timeline, the housing project was selected to be part of the Permanent Affordability Commitment Together (PACT) development in which will happen in the near future. This housing project would have renovations, emergency power systems, boiler replacements, and many repairs.

== See also ==
- New York City Housing Authority
