= Starting Out in the Thirties =

1965 memoir

- Author: Alfred Kazin
- Language: English
- Genre: Autobiography
- Publisher: Little, Brown and Company
- Publication date: 1965
- Publication place: United States
- Pages: 166
- ISBN: 9780394743363

Starting Out in the Thirties is the 1965 memoir by New York intellectual, writer and literary critic, Alfred Kazin. It covers the years between 1934 and 1940 as Kazin makes his entry into New York's literary scene. It is a sequel to his memoir, A Walker in the City (1951) and was followed by New York Jew (1978).

== Reception ==
It was a finalist for the National Book Award for Nonfiction (Arts And Letters) in 1966. Joseph Epstein published a positive review in The New York Times, describing it as "an artful and admirable intellectual autobiography."

John Gross wrote a positive review in The New York Review of Books: "Compared with most autobiographies, the style of Starting Out in the Thirties is vivid and highly charged. Scenes are conjured up with a novelist’s precision: the basement at City College, with its political wrangles and ping-pong marathons and smell of oily sandwiches, or the lean, ruddy-complexioned Yankee individualists at Calverton’s parties standing out among all the “sour, sedentary, guarded” European faces."
