= Amote Sias =

American activist and educator

- Education: Long Island University
- Occupations: Activist and Educator
- Writing career
- Notable awards: Congressional Citation

Amote Sias is an American activist and educator based in Brooklyn. She is a founding principal of Brooklyn Collegiate in Brownsville, Brooklyn.

== Career ==
Sias was active in Brooklyn politics throughout the 1970s and 1980s with a focus on social justice, women's rights and Black Nationalism. She was involved in the committee to Elect Jesse Jackson for President throughout the Jesse Jackson 1988 presidential campaign, and ran for New York City Council herself the following year.

As an educator, Sias taught various subjects and grades from 1985 to 1999, when she became the Leadership Development Coordinator for Brooklyn and Staten Island high schools. She wrote a proposal for the creation of Brooklyn Collegiate, a College Board school that opened in Brownsville, Brooklyn in 2004. In 2010 she was recognized by the United States Congress for her achievements as an educator.
