= Barons of Labor =

Book about San Francisco history in the American Progressive Era

Barons of Labor: The San Francisco Building Trades and Union Power in the Progressive Era
- Author: Michael Kazin
- Language: English
- Subject: Labor history, History of San Francisco
- Genre: Non-fiction, history
- Publisher: University of Illinois Press
- Publication date: 1987
- Publication place: United States
- Pages: pp (original hardback edition)
- ISBN: 978-0252013454

Barons of Labor: The San Francisco Building Trades and Union Power in the Progressive Era is a history of San Francisco during the Progressive Era, focusing on the relationship between labor and management in the construction industry. It was written by Michael Kazin and published by University of Illinois Press in 1987 (hardback edition); it is part of the Working Class in American History series.

== Academic journal reviews ==
- Ramirez, Bruno (1988). "Reviewed work: Barons of Labor: The San Francisco Building Trades and Union Power in the Progressive Era, Michael Kazin". The American Historical Review. 93 (2): 511–512. doi:10.2307/1860087. JSTOR 1860087.
- Galenson, Walter (1987). "Reviewed work: Barons of Labor: The San Francisco Building Trades and Union Power in the Progressive Era., Michael Kazin". The Journal of Economic History. 47 (3): 844–845. doi:10.1017/S0022050700049603. JSTOR 2121391. S2CID 154894205.
- Stromquist, Shelton (1988). "Reviewed work: Barons of Labor: The San Francisco Building Trades and Union Power in the Progressive Era, Michael Kazin". The Journal of American History. 75 (2): 643–644. doi:10.2307/1887953. JSTOR 1887953.
- Erlich, Mark (1989). "Reviewed work: Barons of Labor: The San Francisco Building Trades and Union Power in the Progressive Era, Michael Kazin". International Labor and Working-Class History (35): 107–111. doi:10.1017/S0147547900009182. JSTOR 27671816. S2CID 143874283.
- Schwantes, Carlos A. (1988). "Reviewed work: Barons of Labor: The San Francisco Building Trades and Union Power in the Progressive Era, Michael Kazin". The Western Historical Quarterly. 19 (1): 85. doi:10.2307/969821. JSTOR 969821.
- Issel, William (1989). "Reviewed work: Barons of Labor: The San Francisco Building Trades and Union Power in the Progressive Era, Michael Kazin". Pacific Historical Review. 58 (1): 118–119. doi:10.2307/3641087. JSTOR 3641087.
- Selvin, David F. (1987). "Reviewed work: Barons of Labor: The San Francisco Building Trades and Union Power in the Progressive Era, Michael Kazin". California History. 66 (4): 304–305. doi:10.2307/25177292. JSTOR 25177292.
- Dubofsky, Melvyn (1989). "Reviewed work: Barons of Labor: The San Francisco Building Trades and Union Power in the Progressive Period, Michael Kazin". Labour / Le Travail. 23: 341–343. doi:10.2307/25143183. JSTOR 25143183.
- Schneirov, Richard (1988). "Political Economy and Class Relations: A Path to Synthesis in Labor History". Reviews in American History. 16 (3): 435–442. doi:10.2307/2702278. JSTOR 2702278.

== Publication history ==
- Kazin, M. (1987). Barons of Labor: The San Francisco Building Trades and Union Power in the Progressive Era (1st ed.). University of Illinois Press. ISBN 978-0-252-01345-4.

== See also ==
- History of San Francisco
- History of California (1900–present)
