= Michael Kazin =

American historian (born 1948)

- Born: June 6, 1948 (age 78); New York City, U.S.
- Education: Harvard University (BA); Portland State University (MA); Stanford University (PhD)
- Relatives: Alfred Kazin (father)

Michael Kazin (born June 6, 1948) is an American historian and professor at Georgetown University. He is co-editor of Dissent magazine.

Kazin is the son of literary critic Alfred Kazin, step-son of structural engineer Mario Salvadori, nephew of sociologist Daniel Bell, and cousin of historian David A. Bell. He received degrees from Harvard, Portland State University, and Stanford. During his time at Harvard, he was a leader in Students for a Democratic Society.

He has received fellowships from prestigious institutions and lectured at many universities. He has served twice on the Pulitzer Prize jury for biography and autobiography and was elected to the American Academy of Arts and Sciences in 2020. Politically, Kazin is a member of the Democratic Socialists of America. He has written extensively on American political history and social movements, arguing for strategic collaboration between liberals and leftists to achieve progressive goals.

== Early life ==
Kazin was born in New York City in 1948 and was raised in Englewood, New Jersey. He is the son of literary critic Alfred Kazin, and step-son of structural engineer Mario Salvadori.

He graduated from Dwight-Englewood School in 1966 and received the school's Distinguished Alumni Award in 2006. He received a B.A. in Social Studies from Harvard, an M.A. in History from Portland State University, and a Ph.D. in History from Stanford. As a Harvard student he was a leader in Students for a Democratic Society. In 1969 he briefly was a member of the Weather Underground and then joined the first contingent of the Venceremos Brigade to Cuba.

== Career ==
Kazin's main research interests are American social movements and politics of the 19th and 20th centuries. He has authored books on labor history (Barons of Labor); populism (The Populist Persuasion) and a biography of William Jennings Bryan, (A Godly Hero). He is also co-author (with Maurice Isserman) of America Divided, now in its sixth edition; American Dreamers and War Against War: The American Fight for Peace, 1914-1918. Barons of Labor was awarded the Herbert Gutman Prize in 1988, and War Against War won the award for the best book in peace history published in 2017 and 2018 from the Peace History Society.

Kazin has written numerous reviews and articles for such periodicals as The New York Times, The Washington Post, The New York Review of Books, The New Republic, and The Nation.

He has won fellowships from the Guggenheim Foundation, the Institute for Advanced Study, and the National Endowment for the Humanities, among others. Kazin has been a Fulbright scholar in the Netherlands and Japan. He has twice been a member of the Pulitzer Prize jury for biography and autobiography. In 2020, he was elected to the American Academy of Arts and Sciences.

Kazin is a member of the Democratic Socialists of America. In an article for the Fall 2019 issue of Dissent magazine, Kazin argues that strategic collaboration between liberals and leftists is essential for the realization of a progressive political program. He wrote that "no Democrat will win the presidency in 2020 unless she or he can mobilize a broad coalition in which socialists would still be a distinct minority. In the United States, a strategic alliance between liberals and leftists is the only way durable changes have ever been won ... Abolitionists who joined the Republican Party drove Radical Reconstruction; union activists with socialist convictions helped make the Democrats a semblance of a labor party in big industrial states; the black freedom movement worked with white liberals to pass the Civil Rights and Voting Rights Acts. Such coalitions were short-lived and frustrated radicals who wanted more far-reaching results. But when liberals and leftists remained at odds, as during the final decades of the past century, they made it easier for the right to triumph."

=== Books ===
- Barons of Labor: The San Francisco Building Trades and Union Power in the Progressive Era, University of Illinois Press, 1987
- The Populist Persuasion: An American History, Basic Books, 1995
- America Divided: The Civil War of the 1960s (co-author, Maurice Isserman), Oxford University Press, 1999
- A Godly Hero: The Life of William Jennings Bryan, Alfred A. Knopf, 2006
- The Concise Princeton Encyclopedia of American Political History, Princeton University Press, 2011
- American Dreamers: How the Left Changed a Nation, Alfred A. Knopf, August 2011
- War Against War: The American Fight for Peace, 1914-1918, Simon and Schuster, 2017
- What It Took to Win: A History of the Democratic Party, Farrar, Straus and Giroux, 2022

== Personal life ==
Kazin married physician Beth C. Horowitz in 1980. They have two children, Danny, born in 1988, and Maia, born in 1991.
