= Vernor =

Vernor may refer to:

== Places ==
- Vernor, Queensland, a locality of the Somerset Region in Queensland, Australia

== Names ==
- James Vernor, American pharmacist and druggist
- Vernor Smith, Canadian politician
- Vernor Vinge, American science fiction author and professor
- Vernor v. Autodesk, Inc.
- Vernors, an American soft drink
