= Ginger soda =

Ginger soda can refer to:

- Ginger ale
- Ginger beer.
