= 4th Michigan Cavalry Regiment =

- Michigan state flag
- Active: August 29, 1862, to July 1, 1865
- Country: United States
- Allegiance: Union
- Branch: Cavalry
- Engagements: Stones River; Shelbyville; Chickamauga; Noonday Creek; Atlanta; Selma

4th Michigan Cavalry Regiment was a regiment of cavalry in the Union Army during the American Civil War fighting in the western front as part of the Army of the Cumberland. It was noted as being the regiment that captured the fleeing President of the Confederate States of America, Jefferson Davis, as the Confederacy collapsed in the spring of 1865.

== Service ==
The regiment was organized at Detroit, Michigan, and mustered in on August 29, 1862, under the command of Colonel Robert Horatio George Minty of Jackson, Michigan, Lieutenant Colonel of the 3rd Michigan Cavalry Division.

Regimental staff included Lieutenant Colonel Benjamin Dudley Pritchard of Allegan, Michigan, Major Josiah B. Park of Ovid, Major William H. Dickinson of Grand Rapids, Major Horace Gray of Grosse Ile, Surgeon George W. Fish of Flint, Assistant Surgeon John H. Bacon of Lansing, Adjutant Joseph W. Huston of Paw Paw, Quartermaster Walter C. Arthur of Detroit, Quartermaster Chauncey C. Douglass of Grand Rapids and Commissary Edwin H. Porter of Kalamazoo.

Among the men who served in the 4th Michigan Cavalry was James Vernor, Sr., who after the war became a well-known pharmacist and the developer of Vernor's Ginger Ale. Another early recruit was future Michigan politician Levi T. Griffin.

After training and drilling, it left the state with an enrollment of 1,233 officers and men on September 26, 1862, for duty in Louisville, Kentucky. It saw its first engagement at Stanford, Kentucky, fighting the forces of Confederate General John Morgan, attached to the 1st Brigade, Cavalry Division, Army of the Ohio until November 1862. Other assignments during the war included:

- 1st Brigade, Cavalry Division, Army of the Cumberland, to January, 1863.
- 1st Brigade, 2nd Cavalry Division, Army of the Cumberland, to October, 1863.
- 2nd Brigade, 2nd Cavalry Division, Army of the Cumberland, to November, 1863.
- 1st Brigade, 2nd Cavalry Division, Army of the Cumberland, to November 1864.
- 1st Brigade, 2nd Division, Wilson's Cavalry Corps, Military Division of Mississippi, to November 1864.
- 2nd Brigade, 2nd Division, Cavalry Corps, Military Division of Mississippi, to July 1865.

The 4th Michigan Cavalry fought alongside the 7th Pennsylvania Cavalry, the 4th United States Cavalry and the Chicago Board of Trade Battery as part of Colonel Minty's Sabre Brigade for much of the war. These units fought at Murfreesboro, Stones River, Shelbyville, Reed's Bridge, Chickamauga, Noonday Creek, Atlanta, Kilpatrick Raid and Selma.

The 4th Michigan Cavalry was involved in the capture of Macon, Georgia, on April 20, 1865, along with Col. Henry Harnden and the 1st Wisconsin Cavalry. Subsequently, a detachment of the regiment participated in the pursuit and capture of Jefferson Davis at Irwinville, Georgia, on May 10. Among the troopers credited with playing a key role in identifying and capturing Davis were George Munger and Andrew Bee and Corporal Baxter B. Bennett who secured possession of Jeff Davis (Jefferson Davis) spurs. The spurs were kept in his possession for many years until a family member donated them to a museum in Michigan, which transferred the spurs to the Jefferson Davis collection. Also involved in the capture of Davis was Corporal John William Bowles of Company M. In addition, Daniel H Edwards were one of the six Union soldiers that actually were present at the apprehension on Jefferson Davis.

The 4th was assigned to routine duty at Macon and then at Nashville, Tennessee, until the end of June. The regiment mustered out on July 1, 1865.

== Casualties ==
The initial strength of the regiment was 1,233. During its term of service the regiment gained 984 troops, for a total of 2,217 men. Of that number, 3 officers and 48 enlisted men were killed or mortally wounded in battle, and 2 officers and 341 enlisted men perished from disease.

George Hiscock was a member of Company B, and the oldest man to enlist at the age of 36. He died on June 23, 1864, from disease, and is buried in Chattanooga, TN.

== See also ==
- List of Michigan Civil War Units
- Michigan in the American Civil War
