= Sussex Golden Ginger Ale =

Beverage

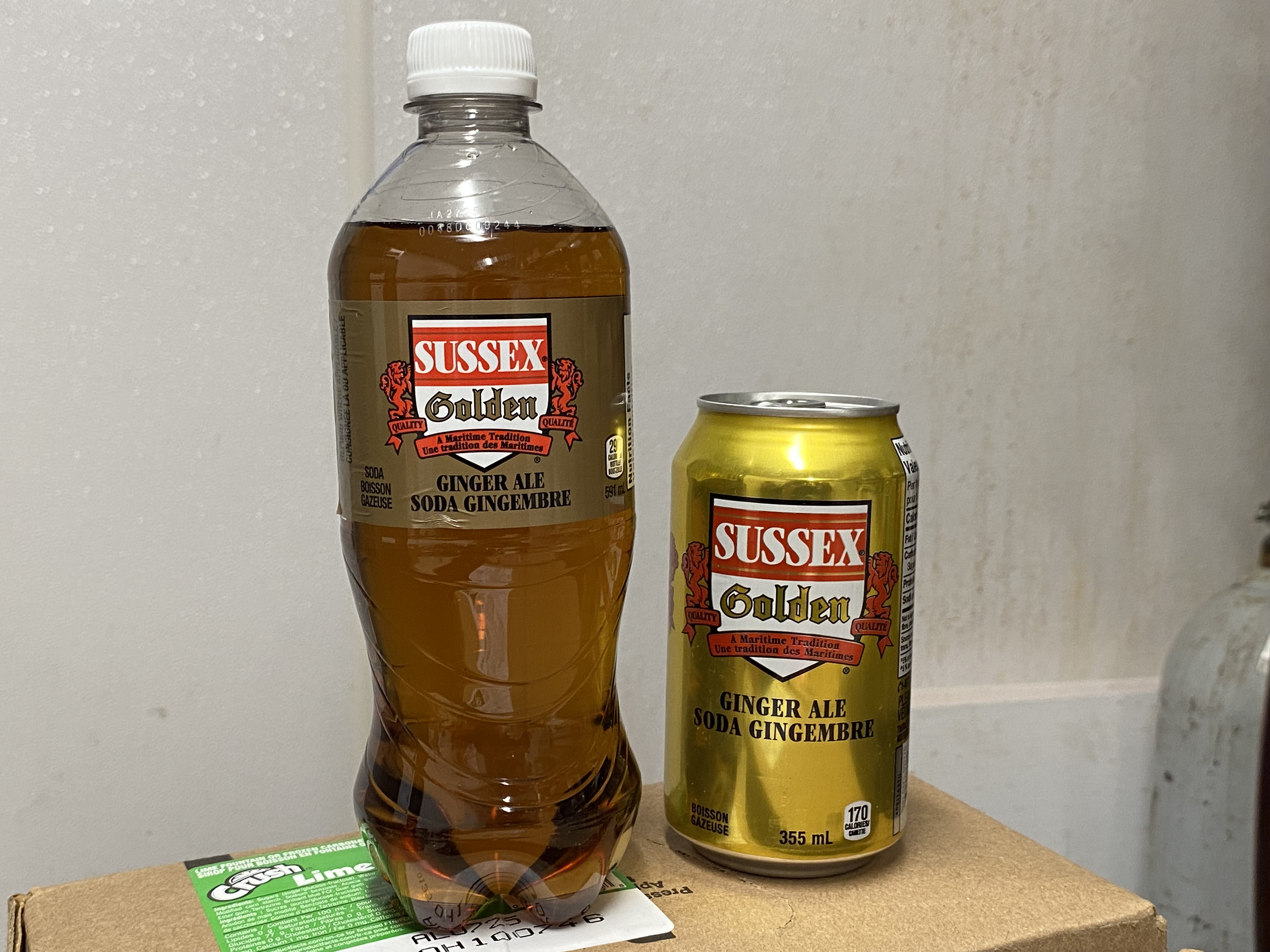
- Sussex Golden Ginger Ale bottle and can
- Type: Ginger Ale
- Manufacturer: Canada Dry Motts, a division of Keurig Dr Pepper
- Origin: Canada
- Introduced: Late 1800s
- Related products: Canada Dry Ginger Ale, Schweppes Ginger Ale, Schweppes Golden Ginger Ale

Sussex Golden Ginger Ale is a "golden" ginger ale originally bottled in the town of Sussex, New Brunswick, Canada. It is produced by Canada Dry Motts, a subsidiary of Keurig Dr Pepper. The beverage is retailed in Atlantic Canada, Quebec and northern areas in the state of Maine.

Ginger ales generally come in two varieties: golden ginger ale, which is dark-coloured and more strongly flavoured; and dry ginger ale, which is more common today. Dry ginger ale was developed during Prohibition when ginger ale was used as a mixer for alcoholic beverages, which made the stronger flavour of the golden variety undesirable. Dry ginger ale quickly became more popular than golden. Today, golden ginger ales like Sussex are an uncommon; they are usually a regional drink.

== Variants ==
Other soft drinks with the Sussex name have been Sussex Pale Dry Ginger Ale, Sussex Red Oval Ginger Ale, Sussex Old English Ginger Beer, Sussex Root Beer, Sussex Orange, Sussex Grape and Sussex Cola.

== Brand ownership ==
The brand has had various owners, including Sussex Mineral Spring Co., Sussex Ginger Ale Ltd., Maritime Beverages Ltd., Great Pacific Industries Inc., Canadian 7up, and Crush Canada Inc. Sussex Golden Ginger Ale is now owned by Keurig Dr Pepper (formerly the Dr Pepper Snapple Group).

== See also ==
- Cadbury-Schweppes
- Canada Dry
- Vernors
