= Boylan Bottling Company =

American soft drink manufacturer

Boylan Bottling Co.
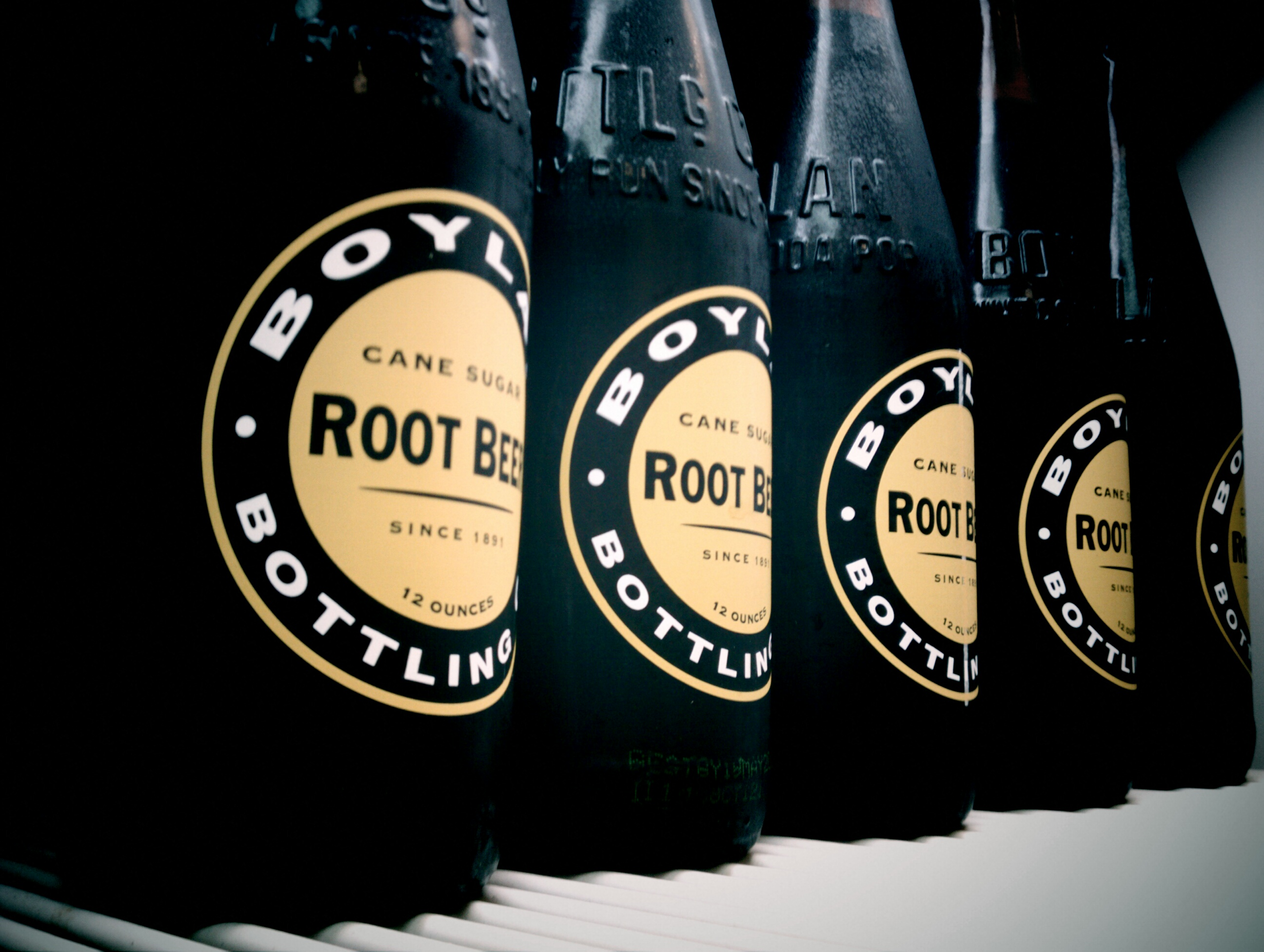
- Industry: Beverages
- Genre: Carbonated Soft Drinks
- Founded: 1891; 135 years ago
- Founder: Steven A Boylan
- Headquarters: New York, New York, United States
- Products: Birch beer, Ginger Ale, Soft drinks, Seltzers, Mixers
- Website: BoylanBottling.com

Boylan Bottling Company is an American gourmet soft drink manufacturer located in New York City. The company was founded in Paterson, New Jersey, in 1891. Boylan products are known for glass bottles with distinctive, retro style labels. The company's beverages use pure cane sugar and are bottled exclusively in glass.

== History ==
Boylan's first product was birch beer, based on a recipe formulated in 1891 in Paterson, New Jersey, by pharmacist Steven William Boylan.

Ron and Mark Fiorina's grandfather purchased the company from the Boylan family in the 1930s. From the late 1950s until 2001, the company was based in Haledon, New Jersey. Its facilities were then moved to Clifton, New Jersey, for a short time, before being relocated again to Moonachie, New Jersey, then to Teterboro, New Jersey, and, in 2013, to New York City.

On September 10, 2003, Boylan was acquired by Emigrant Bank in conjunction with the private equity firm The Courtney Group. The acquisition was the first transaction in the beverage sector for both purchasers, and their first in New Jersey, where Boylan's headquarters were then located in Teterboro. As part of the transaction, Emigrant Capital executive-in-residence Val Stalowir joined Boylan's board of directors.

== Products ==
Among the brand's soft drink flavors are:

- Black cherry (also available as a low calorie version)
- Cola (also available as a low calorie version)
- Creme soda (also available as a low calorie version)
- Ginger ale (also available as a low calorie version)
- Grape
- Lemon lime
- Orange
- Red birch beer
- Root beer (also available as a low calorie version)
- Seltzer
- Shirley Temple

== See also ==
- List of bottling companies
