= Blenheim, South Carolina =

- Town
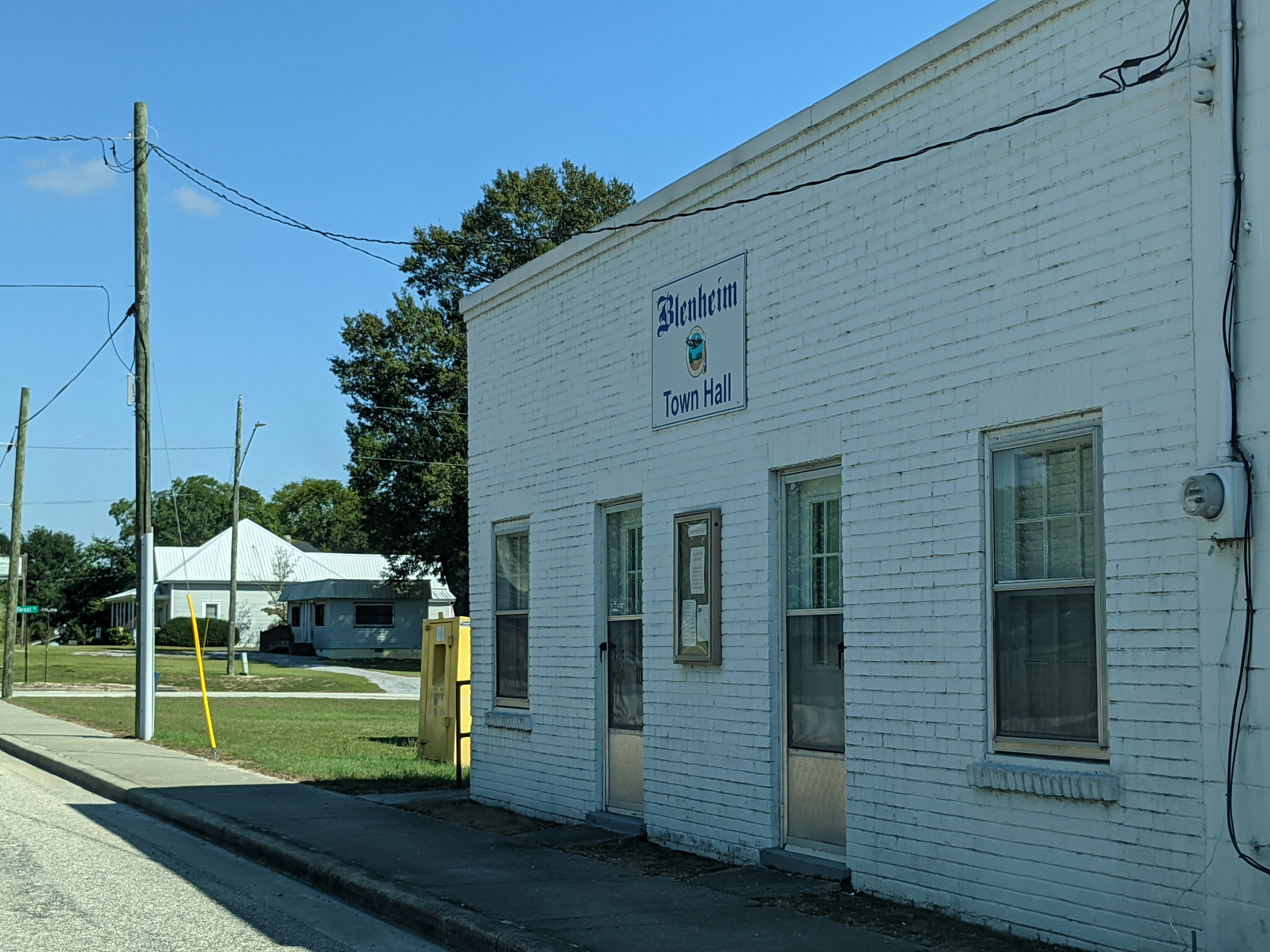
- Blenheim, SC Town Hall

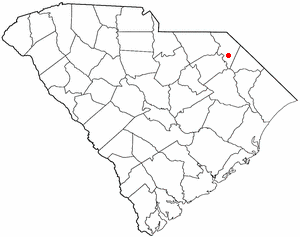
- Location of Blenheim in South Carolina
- Coordinates: 34°30′27″N 79°39′11″W
- Country: United States
- State: South Carolina
- County: Marlboro

Area
  - Total: 0.65 sq mi (1.69 km^{2})
  - Land: 0.65 sq mi (1.69 km^{2})
  - Water: 0 sq mi (0.00 km^{2})
- Elevation: 115 ft (35 m)

Population (2020)
  - Total: 115
  - Density: 176.0/sq mi (67.95/km^{2})
- Time zone: UTC-5 (EST)
  - Summer (DST): UTC-4 (EDT)
- ZIP code: 29516
- Area codes: 843, 854
- FIPS code: 45-06850
- GNIS feature ID: 2405279

Blenheim /ˈblɪnəm/ is a town in Marlboro County, South Carolina, United States. As of the 2020 census, Blenheim had a population of 115. It is named for Blenheim Palace in Oxfordshire, England. Blenheim Palace was the residence of the Duke of Marlborough, after whom Marlboro County is named.

Blenheim Ginger Ale was originally bottled in Blenheim, with the local mineral water.

== Geography ==
According to the United States Census Bureau, the town has a total area of 0.6 square miles (1.6 km^{2}), all land.

== Demographics ==
Historical population
Census	Pop.	Note	%±
1890	95		—
1900	176		85.3%
1910	228		29.5%
1920	234		2.6%
1930	253		8.1%
1940	237		−6.3%
1950	153		−35.4%
1960	185		20.9%
1970	236		27.6%
1980	202		−14.4%
1990	191		−5.4%
2000	137		−28.3%
2010	154		12.4%
2020	115		−25.3%
U.S. Decennial Census

=== Racial and ethnic composition ===
Blenheim town, South Carolina – Racial and ethnic composition Note: the US Census treats Hispanic/Latino as an ethnic category. This table excludes Latinos from the racial categories and assigns them to a separate category. Hispanics/Latinos may be of any race.
Race / Ethnicity (NH = Non-Hispanic)	Pop 2000	Pop 2010	Pop 2020	% 2000	% 2010	% 2020
White alone (NH)	59	87	60	43.07%	56.49%	52.17%
Black or African American alone (NH)	75	58	49	54.74%	37.66%	42.61%
Native American or Alaska Native alone (NH)	3	3	0	2.19%	1.95%	0.00%
Asian alone (NH)	0	0	0	0.00%	0.00%	0.00%
Native Hawaiian or Pacific Islander alone (NH)	0	0	0	0.00%	0.00%	0.00%
Other race alone (NH)	0	0	0	0.00%	0.00%	0.00%
Mixed race or Multiracial (NH)	0	6	5	0.00%	3.90%	4.35%
Hispanic or Latino (any race)	0	0	1	0.00%	0.00%	0.87%
Total	137	154	115	100.00%	100.00%	100.00%

=== 2020 census ===
As of the census of 2000, there were 138 people, 63 households, and 36 families residing in the town. The population density was 210.1 inhabitants per square mile (81.1/km^{2}). There were 78 housing units at an average density of 119.6 per square mile (46.2/km^{2}). The racial makeup of the town was 43.07% White, 54.74% African American and 2.19% Native American.

There were 63 households, out of which 15.9% had children under the age of 18 living with them, 41.3% were married couples living together, 15.9% had a female householder with no husband present, and 41.3% were non-families. 41.3% of all households were made up of individuals, and 17.5% had someone living alone who was 65 years of age or older. The average household size was 2.17 and the average family size was 2.97.

In the town, the population was spread out, with 17.5% under the age of 18, 6.6% from 18 to 24, 27.0% from 25 to 44, 29.2% from 45 to 64, and 19.7% who were 65 years of age or older. The median age was 44 years. For every 100 females, there were 77.9 males. For every 100 females age 18 and over, there were 82.3 males.

The median income for a household in the town was $26,667, and the median income for a family was $40,625. Males had a median income of $28,750 versus $18,750 for females. The per capita income for the town was $17,840. There were 22.6% of families and 15.5% of the population living below the poverty line, including no under eighteens and 44.0% of those over 64.

== Notable people ==
- John L. Napier - U.S. House of Representatives member and Judge
