= George Munger (soldier) =

George Munger, Corporal, 4th Michigan Cavalry Company L. is credited with having recognized and helped to capture Jefferson Davis.

Corp. George Munger

Although Private Andrew Bee of Martin, Michigan also claimed to be the first to recognize Davis, the official report submitted by General James H. Wilson, Commander of the Cavalry Corps, Department of the Mississippi, credited Allegan, Michigan native George Munger with blocking Davis’ escape after others alerted him, allowing Lieutenant-Colonel B D Pritchard's regiment to capture Davis and end his hopes of re-establishing the Confederate Government in the Trans-Mississippi.
