= Benjamin D. Pritchard =

Union Army officer

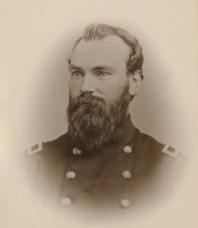
Brev. Brig. Gen. B D Pritchard

Benjamin Dudley Pritchard (January 29, 1835 – November 26, 1907) was a United States Army officer, most known for leading the Union cavalry regiment which captured the fugitive Jefferson Davis, President of the Confederate States of America, in the weeks surrounding the close of the American Civil War.

== Early life and career ==
Benjamin Pritchard was born to Lambert and Zulpha (Adams) Pritchard in rural Nelson, Ohio. Pritchard worked in the carpentry and cabinet-making trade until he had earned and saved enough money to enroll at Hiram College, where his instructor was James A. Garfield (who would later serve as United States President). He studied penmanship under the Spencer Brothers, whose father had invented the Spencerian Script.

Following his work at Hiram College, in 1856, Pritchard went to Allegan, Michigan, where he studied law under the tutelage of Judge W. B. Williams and taught for Allegan Public Schools at a salary of $240 per year. In 1858, he continued his studies at the University of Michigan, graduating and achieving admittance to the bar in 1860. Upon his return to Allegan, he partnered with Judge Williams to established a law practice.

== Civil War ==
In 1862, Pritchard and Judge Williams both enlisted in the Union Army. Pritchard entered the 4th Michigan Cavalry, Company L, as a captain. Following the Battle of Chickamauga (September 30 – October 3, 1863), he was promoted to the rank of lieutenant colonel.

On September 1, 1864, while on a short leave, Pritchard traveled to Chagrin Falls, Ohio, where he was married to Mary Bently Kent. They honeymooned in Allegan at Judge Williams's home before Pritchard returned to his regiment. Meanwhile, his new bride was in a train wreck and subsequently had to use a wheelchair, after which she took up the art of painting. Upon Pritchard's discharge, they set up residence at 330 Davis Street in what is now part of Allegan's historic district.

=== Rise to military fame ===
At Abbeyville, Georgia, 70 miles south of Macon, it was learned that Davis's fleeing party had crossed the ferry over the Ocmulgee River and was moving southward toward Irwinville, 30 miles below Abbeyville and 100 miles south of Macon. Lieutenant Colonel Pritchard, in command of the 4th Michigan Cavalry, marched the regiment rapidly down the river road, and, after a 30-mile ride, reached Irwinville late in the night. There, he learned that he was now in advance of the Davis party.

One of Pritchard's officers, Corp. George Munger (of Allegan, Michigan), soon discovered the Confederate president's encampment. He noticed two women moving rapidly away from the camp as the 4th Michigan approached and thought they looked suspicious, so he stopped them and asked that they remove their cloaks. Upon so doing, it was revealed that the two "women" were Jefferson Davis and his wife, both wearing women's cloaks and shawls trying to escape capture. (The cloak and shawl worn by the Confederate president are now the property of the National Archives.)

Davis later wrote of the event: "I had gone perhaps fifteen yards when a trooper galloped up and ordered me to halt and surrender to which I gave a defiant answer. He leveled his carbine at me but I expected if he fired he would miss. My intention was to put my hand under his foot, tumble him off on the other side, spring into his saddle and escape.". A number of cartoons and mockery songs appeared in the public during the weeks and months that followed, chiding Davis for the attire he was captured in. P. T. Barnum even made a giant-sized replica of "Davis in drag."

Pritchard insisted on giving thorough credit to all who played a role in the capture. He worked on the report for 48 straight hours, closing it with a recommendation that the following men receive brevet promotions:

"Captain Hathaway, commanding that part of the regiment picketing the river; Captain Charles Hudson, in command of Advance Guard of fourteen picked men who led the column into the Camp; Lieutenant Silas A. Stauber and Henry S. Boutell who were commanding fifty men in each detachment, the latter of whom was severely wounded while gallantly leading his men; Lieutenant A. B. Purinton who had charge of the Dismounted men and making the circuit of the enemies' camp; Lieutenants Dickinson and Davis for General Duties as aids and Bennett commanding the rear guard. Also, Corporals Munger of "C" Company, Crittendon of "E" Company, together with Private James Bullard "C" Company, Andrew Bee and Daniel Edward of "L" Company, who were present at the halting of Davis."

As his reward for making the capture, Colonel Pritchard was brevetted out of service as a brigadier general (and the larger pension that came with that rank) and a $3000 share of the bounty which President Johnson offered for Davis's apprehension (1868 Draft #2186 drawn on Warrant #3749).

== After the war ==
Following the war, the now-famous national hero returned to Allegan, where he resumed his law partnership with Judge Williams, continuing the practice until 1868. He and Mary had a daughter—Bertha Edna—on September 24, 1869, and a son—Harry—on August 5, 1873. Pritchard supported several churches, but he and his family made Allegan First Congregational Church their place of worship.

Pritchard turned down the nomination for Governor of Michigan in 1884, deferring to and supporting the incumbent, David Jerome of Saginaw. He was strongly encouraged to run for Congress, but declined in favor of continuing his term on the Allegan School Board, which position he held for many years as the only elected local post he was willing to serve from. He did, however, serve two terms of office as the State Treasurer of Michigan from 1880 to 1884.

As School Board Director, Pritchard had three new elementary schools built and annexed to North Ward school, which had stood as an autonomous district, and organized Allegan's first high school, which graduated its first class in 1876 (dubbed the Centennial Class due to its coincidence with the Nation's 100th birthday). The school had a staff of two, both of whom taught, and one of whom simultaneously served as the schools superintendent and principal.

In 1870, Pritchard organized the First National Bank of Allegan and served as its president until 1905. He then relinquished his shares in that bank and founded the First State Bank, which was the first bank in the county to be anointed as a state depository. It was also the first savings bank, offering 4% interest to depositors, and the first bank to install safety deposit boxes.

== Death and burial ==
His family reports that he began experiencing consistent chest pains around November 12, 1907. On Sunday, November 24, his family physician examined him, finding nothing wrong with Pritchard. He went to work the following day, as usual, but was stricken with acute angina pectoris at home that evening. His physician was called in and morphine was administered, but it took two hours for the pain to subside. He didn't report to work Tuesday, November 26,—the first day he had taken off in forty years. At about 5:30 p.m., he told his daughter that he was feeling fine and suggested she go rest. Before she could leave the room, he gasped, and his life was over. Since none outside his immediate family had been given an indication of his illness, the news of his apparently sudden death sent a shockwave across the state as the loss of one of its greatest heroes was mourned.

Pritchard was interred in Oakwood Cemetery (Allegan) on November 29, 1907, the Grand Army of the Republic, the Rev. William Lucas of the local Episcopal Church, and the Rev. A. V. Brashear of the local Presbyterian Church officiating. Over 600 attended the service.

== State-published biography ==
From Bingham, S.D. (Stephen D.) (1888). "s.v., Pritchard, Benjamin D.". Early history of Michigan, with biographies of state officers, members of Congress, judges and legislators: Pub. pursuant to act 59, 1887. Lansing: Thorp & Godfrey, State Printers and Binders. p. 538.

"Commissioner of the state land office, 1867 to 1871, and state treasurer 1879 to 1883, was born in Nelson, Ohio and educated at Western Reserve College. He came to Michigan in 1856, graduated from the law department of the University in 1860, and commenced practice at Allegan, his present home. He went into the war as captain in the 4th Michigan cavalry, and was promoted to the rank of brevet brigadier general, and a part of his war record was the capture of Jefferson Davis. He is a Republican, and president of the national bank at Allegan."

== Ancestry ==
Roger Pritchard, immigrated from England to Milford, Connecticut in 1653; married Elizabeth Prudden

Benjamin Pritchard (1657-1743); married Rebecca Jones

Jones Benjamin Pritchard (1716-1782); married Martha Lambert (1721-1804)

Benjamin Pritchard (1756-?); served 7 years in American Revolutionary War; married Ann Vaughn (1768-1807)

Lambert Pritchard (1802-1875); married Zulpha Adams (1812-1898)

Benjamin Dudley Pritchard (1835-1907); married Mary Bentley Kent (1840-1889)

== Legacy ==
The ownership of Pritchard's Allegan house, containing some of his furniture and belongings, eventually passed to his descendant Rob Proctor and his wife Denni. Rob, Denni and the house were featured in an episode of If Walls Could Talk. Rob and Denni moved away with their children, Katie and Brian, and the house left Pritchard hands for the first time.

== Documentation ==
- The Life and Times of General B. D. Pritchard by James J. Green (Allegan: Allegan County Historical Society, 1979)
- Harper's Weekly (May 27, 1865)
- Michigan History Magazine (May/June 2000)

Political offices
Preceded by William B. McCreery	Treasurer of Michigan; 1879–1882	Succeeded by Edward H. Butler
