= Jacksonville Journal =

Defunct daily newspaper

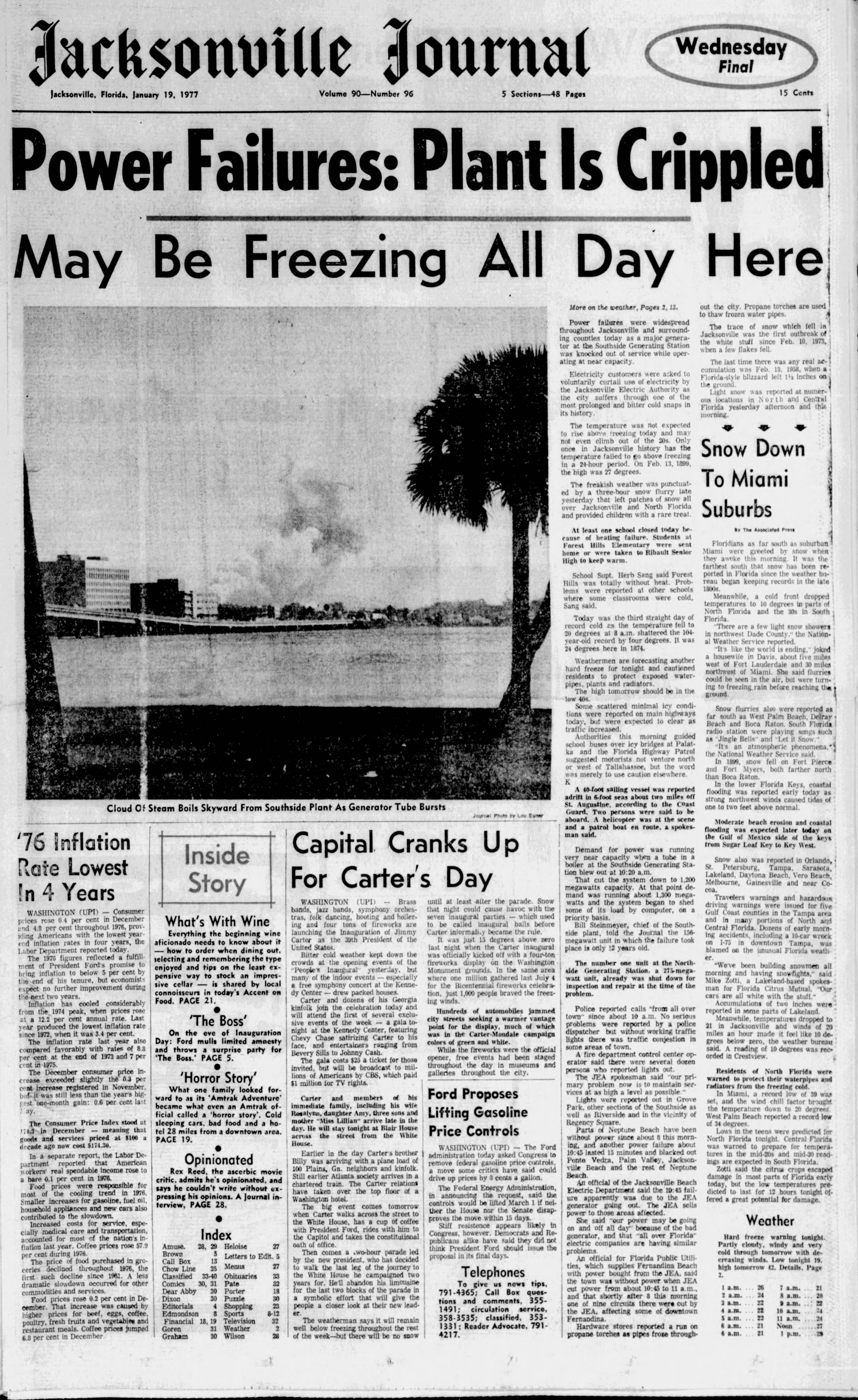
- Front page of the January 1, 1977 issue covering the cold wave of January 1977
- Type: Daily newspaper
- Owner(s): Perry family (1922–1959); Florida Publishing Company (1959–1983); Morris Communications (1983–1988)
- Founded: 1887
- Ceased publication: October 28, 1988
- Language: English
- Headquarters: Jacksonville, Florida
- Sister newspapers: Florida Times-Union (1959-1988)

The Jacksonville Journal was an afternoon newspaper in the Jacksonville, Florida, area. It began publication as the Metropolis in 1887 before being renamed The Florida Metropolis in the early 1900s and then the Jacksonville Journal in 1922. It ceased publishing in 1988.

== History ==
=== Early history ===
The newspaper began publication as The Metropolis in 1887. Renamed The Florida Metropolis in the early 1900s, it was renamed the Jacksonville Journal in 1922 upon its purchase by John H. Perry. The Journal's new owner was known for his focus on the community and boosterism. Perry once proposed that the city change its name to 'Jackson' because the suffix '-ville' was belittling to a growing metropolis.

The Journal was historically the weaker newspaper in its rivalry with the local morning newspaper, The Florida Times-Union, and published only Monday through Friday. The Journal branched out into local media outlets with a radio station—WJHP (1320 AM)—and television station. WJHP-TV, which operated from December 1953 to October 1957, did not perform as well as expected because it was an ultra high frequency station (channel 36) at a time when most televisions required extra-cost converter boxes to access the station. It shut down shortly after WFGA-TV started on channel 12 in the very high frequency (VHF) band.

=== Period of growth ===
Although it had a smaller circulation, the Journal had its moments in the 1960s. When President Kennedy was assassinated, the Journal set records for evening readership with its Extra editions that kept locals updated about the tragedy. More copies would have been printed if the presses were not struck. The Journal later scored a major coup when one of its photographers won a Pulitzer Prize in 1968. "The Kiss of Life" by Rocco Morabito depicted a city utility lineman reviving a colleague with mouth-to-mouth resuscitation atop a utility pole.

The Journal was a plucky younger sister to the Times-Union during the 1970s and 1980s. The Journal pioneered a special supplement for youth called "Action". The Journal, once known for including foil in its issues for cooking, made a tradition of printing on green paper for St. Patrick's Day.

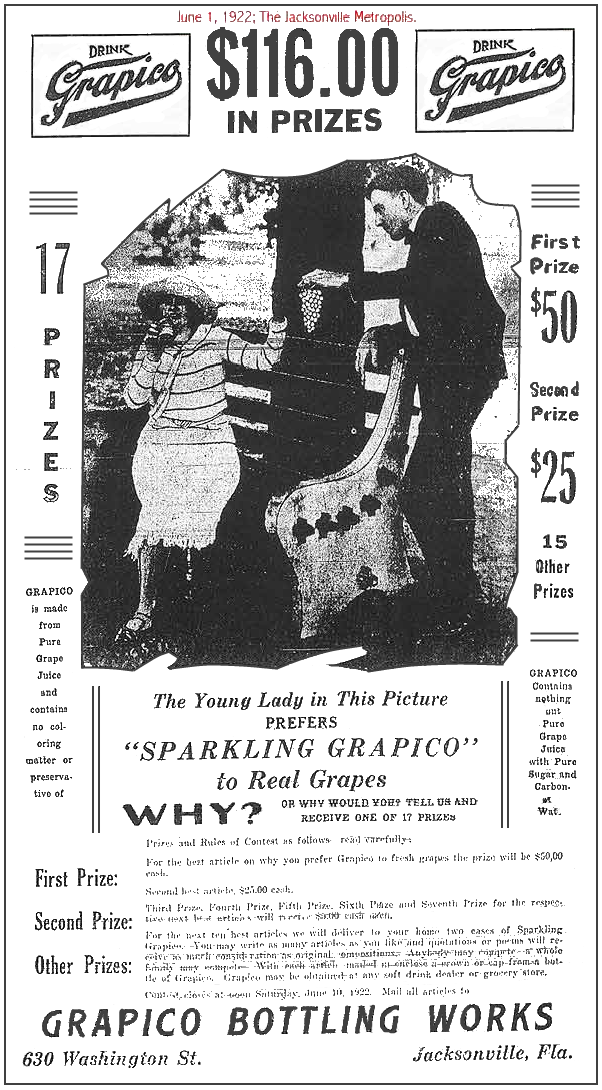
Florida Grapico Bottling Works advertisement in the June 1, 1922, issue of the Jacksonville Metropolis newspaper illustrating the Journal's style of ad presentation at that time.

=== Decline ===
Perry died in 1952, and his death spurred speculation about the fate of his newspaper chain (which also included The Palm Beach Post). Rumors arose that the Hearst newspaper chain was going to purchase one or all of his holdings. For the rest of the decade Perry's sons managed the affairs of publishing. In 1959, The Times-Union's parent company—Florida Publishing Company—bought the Journal. Journal staff moved from their Laura Street building, where they had been since 1926, to The Times-Union's plant at 400 West Adams Street. The two papers worked as rival staffs in cramped quarters until they moved to a new location at One Riverside Avenue in 1967.

Changing times eventually turned the tide against the Journal. The habit of watching evening newscasts on television grew because the 6 p.m. news offered more current news than a paper that was published in the early afternoon. Furthermore, the logistical difficulty of distributing papers to outlying areas doomed the Journal. Circulation fell from the 70,000s to near or below 30,000. The Journal ceased publication on October 28, 1988, only one year after celebrating its 100th anniversary.

== See also ==
- The Florida Times-Union
