= Grapico =

Soft drink of the southeastern US made since 1916

- A can of Grapico
- Type: Soft drink
- Manufacturer: Sun Fresh Beverages
- Distributor: Buffalo Rock
- Origin: United States (New Orleans, Louisiana and Birmingham, Alabama)
- Introduced: 1916
- Colour: Purple
- Flavour: Artificial Grape
- Variants: Diet Grapico
- Related products: Welch's Grape Soda; Grape Nehi; Grapette; Grape Crush; Stewart's Grape Soda; NuGrape
- Website: Grapico.com

Grapico is a caffeine-free, artificially flavored carbonated soft drink with a purple color and a grape taste that is sold in the Southeastern United States. When introduced in 1916, the product quickly became a success, which in part was due to implying that Grapico contained real grape juice even though it does not. In the spring of 1926, J. Grossman's Sons sold the Grapico business to the Pan American Manufacturing Company in New Orleans. Pan American continued J. Grossman's Sons' improper practice of implying that Grapico contained real grape juice and lost the right to use the word "Grapico" to designate their artificial grape drink in 1929.

Although the J. Grossman's Sons line of the brand had ended, the Grapico brand continued on through Alabama businessman R. R. Rochell and his Birmingham, Alabama–based Grapico Bottling Works. R. R. Rochell had first become a wholesale syrup customer of J. Grossman's Sons in the summer of 1917 to serve the Alabama soft drink market. By the time Pan American had lost their artificial grape drink name in 1929, Rochell was selling bottled Grapico in Alabama, Florida, Georgia, Mississippi, and Louisiana.

Rochell received the federal trademark on Grapico in 1940, giving his Grapico Company of America the right to use the name "Grapico" everywhere in the United States. In 1955, Grapico Company of America attempted to expand its fruit-flavored brands with Orangico, a sister product to Grapico that included real orange juice. The orange juice-based Orangico did not sell well and the federal trademark eventually expired. In September 1981, both the franchising rights to the Grapico brand name and The Pepsi Bottling Group in Newnan, Georgia, were acquired by Buffalo Rock, an independent Pepsi bottler based in Birmingham, Alabama. Buffalo Rock revived the Orangico trademark in 1999 for an artificially flavored orange drink and introduced Diet Grapico in 2005. Grapico is now produced at Buffalo Rock's Birmingham, Alabama bottling facility.

== History ==
Grapico was first sold in 1914 in New Orleans, Louisiana, by J. Grossman's Sons. In the summer of 1917, businessman R. R. Rochell and his Birmingham, Alabama–based Grapico Bottling Works purchased Grapico syrup barrels from J. Grossman's Sons and bottled and sold Grapico to the Alabama soft drink market, becoming the first bottler to buy the syrup wholesale. Present Grapico distributor Buffalo Rock, an independent Pepsi bottler based in Birmingham, Alabama, purchased the Grapico business in 1981. The J. Grossman's Sons' Grapico retail sales line ended in 1929 and the present Grapico traces its roots to the summer of 1917 in Birmingham, Alabama through R. R. Rochell's Grapico.

=== J. Grossman's Sons' Grapico ===
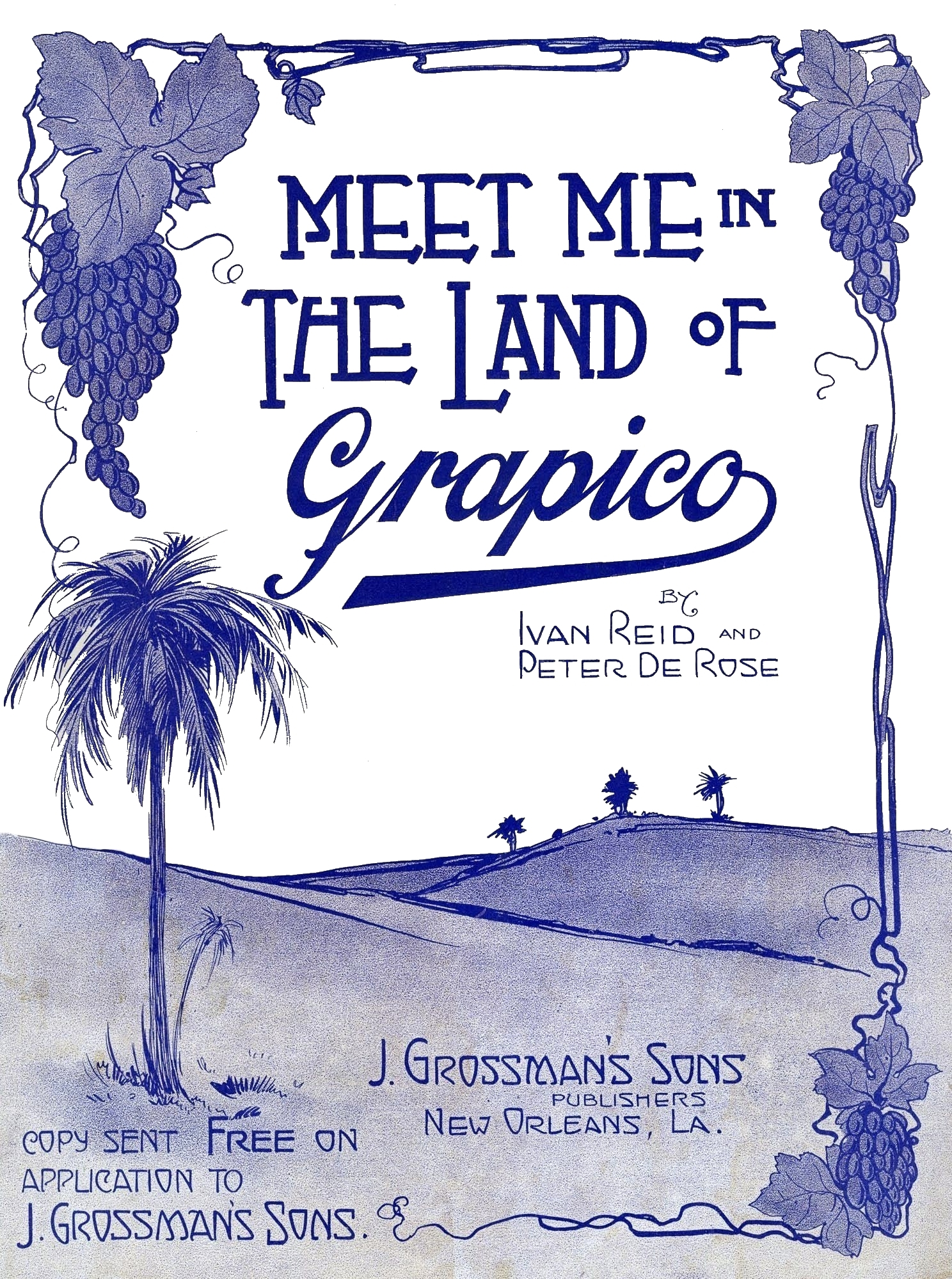
Cover sheet for the 1916 song "Meet Me in the Land of Grapico"

J. Grossman's Sons was a business that had been operating in New Orleans, Louisiana, since at least 1884. By the early 1900s, the business was being run by both Adolph Grossman and Isidore Grossman. Prior to developing Grapico, J. Grossman's Sons served as creditors. In 1905 for example, a collection attorney successfully sued J. Grossman's Sons to recover legal fees for reducing to judgment a debt of $875 owed to J. Grossman's Sons. Also in 1905, J. Grossman's Sons unsuccessfully prevented the sale of their securing collateral, a debtor's home, to the debtor's daughter. In January 1912, J. Grossman's Sons lent $1000 to a Lewisburg, Louisiana, saloon owner who they successfully sued eleven months later to recover the amount against his real estate.

J. Grossman's Sons began manufacturing Grapico in 1914. At that time, Grapico consisted of a syrup that, when mixed with soda water, had the taste, smell, and color of a genuine grape drink. The product was artificially colored and flavored with only an infinitesimal amount of grape juice or fruit of the grape.

Prior to 1916, J. Grossman's Sons contacted American jazz composers Peter DeRose and Ivan Reid to write a song about Grapico. DeRose, who would later be inducted into the Songwriters Hall of Fame, produced the piano accompanied song, Meet Me in the Land of Grapico. Meet Me in the Land of Grapico is a sentimental ballad from Tin Pan Alley that imagined a faraway Land of Grapico where love lives forever. The song (see below) and its cover sheet alluded to a grape vine-covered arbor in the Land of Grapico, even though Grapico contained no grape juice. Dedicating the song to all the drinkers of Grapico, J. Grossman's Sons published the song in 1916 and provided it free on request.

In the summer of 1917, businessman R. R. Rochell and his Birmingham, Alabama–based Grapico Bottling Works began purchasing Grapico syrup barrels from J. Grossman's Sons to bottle and sell the Alabama soft drink market. In that same year, Laurel, Mississippi–based Grapico Bottling Company also became a wholesale customer of J. Grossman's Sons and began bottling and selling Grapico in Mississippi. In 1918, Rochell's Grapico Bottling Works opened a bottling plant in Hattiesburg, Mississippi as a second Mississippi bottler and seller of Grapico.

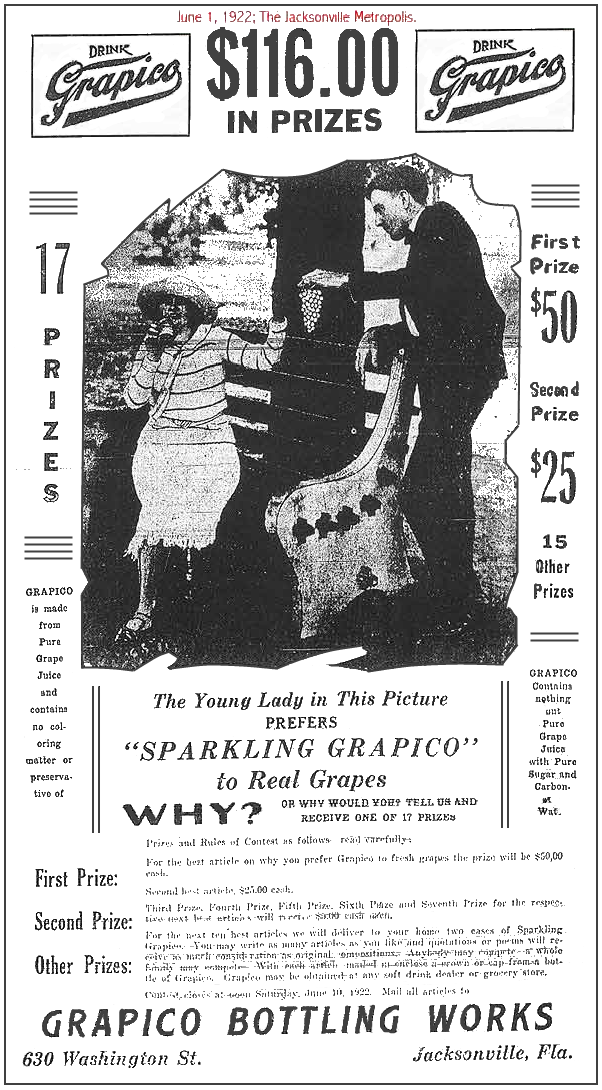
June 1, 1922 ad by Grapico Bottling Works in The Jacksonville Metropolis Florida newspaper.

By 1919, Grapico manufacturer J. Grossman's Sons was successful enough in their efforts to distribute Grapico that they awarded the Grapico advertising account to the Chambers Agency, Inc. of New Orleans. As early as November 1919, businessman J. C. Kramer was doing business in Louisiana under the name of the Grapico Bottling Works (Louisiana), a business unconnected with Rochell's Grapico Bottling Works.

In 1920, the demand for soft drinks significantly increased as a result of the prohibition against alcohol in the United States that began on January 29, 1920. The Grapico product was so successful by 1920, that Grapico specifically was listed in the Louisiana law among generic items, Coca-Cola, and RC Cola as items to be taxed: Section 22 of Act No. 233 of 1920, which read:

That all persons, associations of persons, firms and corporations engaged in the sale of soda water, ice cream, confections, soda pop, Coca Cola, Chero-Cola, Grapico or other similar soft drinks or beverages or refreshments, shall pay license based on the gross annual sales, and such licenses are hereby fixed and graded as follows.

In addition to experiencing taxes as a result of its success, the Grapico efforts found labor troubles. In 1920, the International Union of United Brewery, Flour, Cereal, Soft Drink and Distillery Workers presented Grapico Bottling Company (Mississippi) with a union agreement. When the company refused to sign the agreement, the 112 employees at Grapico Bottling Company were called to strike. The Grapico Bottling Co. eventually signed the agreement.

In June 1922, Grapico Bottling Works furthered the connection between the artificially flavored beverage and real grape juice through an advertisement campaign. On June 1, 1922, The Jacksonville Metropolis published a Grapico Bottling Works advertisement announcing a ten-day writing contest that offered US$116 in prize money for essays on why a consumer would prefer "Sparkling Grapico" over real, fresh grapes. The advertisement indicated that Grapico was made from Pure Grape Juice with pure sugar and carbonated water and had no coloring or preservatives. Although not true, this information was consistent with the Grapico product labels used by J. Grossman's Sons on the barrels that were shipped to and received by R. R. Rochell.

1917 image of J. Grossman's Sons packaging Grapico syrup in barrels for use by Grapico Bottling Company

Mississippi based Grapico Bottling Company troubles did not end with its union problems. In September 1924, John Henry Ennis of Ellisville, Mississippi, purchased a Grapico. On drinking it, Ennis discovered that the contents were filled with flies, some of which he swallowed and became sick. On filing a lawsuit against Grapico Bottling Company and its sole stockholder, Philip Carriere, Ennis learned that Grapico Bottling Company had filed for and successfully dissolved itself as a corporation between the time Ennis consumed the flies and filed suit against Grapico Bottling. On appeal, the Supreme Court of Mississippi issued an opinion that serve as precedent in Mississippi for the rule that a stockholder of a corporation is not liable for the debts, liabilities, and other acts of the corporation. After Grapico Bottling Company (Mississippi) dissolved in 1925, Rochell's Grapico Bottling Works became the sole supplier of Grapico to Mississippi.

==== Unfair competition through deceptive advertising ====
Since almost its inception in 1914, Grapico was associated with real grape juice by J. Grossman's Sons through its advertisements and business stationery. Publicly associating Grapico with genuine grape juice allowed J. Grossman's Sons to compete directly with real grape juice producers such as Welch Grape Juice Co. and have an advantage over other imitation grape flavored beverage producers. A problem with this approach was that Grapico was an artificial grape drink that included neither real grape juice nor fruit from the grape.

1917 image of J. Grossman's Sons adding Grapico soft drink to bottles to be sold to consumers.

In May 1926, J. Grossman's Sons became a defunct corporation and sold its Grapico formula and all rights connected to that formula to Pan American Manufacturing Co., Inc., a Louisiana corporation that had been manufacturing and selling extracts, ice cream powder, and syrups and flavors for soft drinks from New Orleans since 1911. Pan American began manufacturing Grapico syrup and concentrate and continued supplying its wholesale customers outside of Louisiana with one-gallon bottles of concentrated Grapico to allow them to make Grapico. In addition, through its subsidiary corporation, World Bottling Co., Pan American continued supplying its retail customers in Louisiana with bottled Grapico for consumption. At the time Pan American acquired the Grapico business, it had three wholesale Grapico customers: Rochell's Grapico Bottling Works in Birmingham, Alabama and two bottling plants operating in Mississippi. Grapico concentrate was sold by Pan American to its wholesale customers for $7.50 per gallon and the finished bottled Grapico was by sold by Pan American and its three wholesale customers at 5 cents per 7-oz bottle.

Pan American continued associating their artificial grape drink with real grape juice in advertisements in trade periodicals, display cards, newspapers, boys' caps for customers' use, and in its company stationery. Typically, advertising material displayed images of grape vineyards and bunches of grapes together with the qualifying statements:

Sparkling
Grapico
Naturally Good
Acknowledged
The Best
Grape Drink
On The Market
Sparkling
Grapico
Naturally Good
The Drink of The Nation

In addition, Pan American continued J. Grossman's Sons practice of using 7-oz clear bottles with molded labels prominently featuring a pictorial representation of a bunch of grapes with word "Grapico". Given that the product was artificially colored and flavored to simulate the appearance, taste and smell of grape juice, the combination of the advertisements, the bottle grape bunch mold, and the product itself implied to others that the Grapico product was composed of pure grape juice.

In July 1928, the Federal Trade Commission charged Pan American with unfair methods of competition and deceptive practices. After learning of the Federal Trade Commission complaint, Pan American altered the labels it used on its one-gallon concentrate jugs. However, the efforts were too little, too late and Pan American and its "representatives, agents, servants, employees, and successors" lost the right to use the word "Grapico" to designate their artificial grape drink as of 1929. Pan American's wholesale customers, including R. R. Rochell, were seen as victims of Pan American's unfair competition and the cease and desist order regarding the Grapico name did not extend to them.

=== R. R. Rochell's Grapico ===
R. R. Rochell was a successful business man operating in Birmingham, Alabama. His success came despite the fact that he was illiterate. He was one of two major stock holders in the Edgewood Amusement Company, which dissolved in 1924. Rochell began selling bottled Grapico in Alabama in 1917 and then in Mississippi in 1918. In June 1920, Rochell's Grapico Bottling Works formally incorporated in Alabama as "The Grapico Bottling Works".

Rochell's early Grapico efforts were not without problems. For example, in November 1921, Grapico Bottling Works acquired a US$648 Baltimore Semi-Automatic Machine, Model B-1485 from New Orleans–based Crown Cork and Seal Co. to cork and seal soda water bottles. Within three months, the bottle capper began to fail. Frequently, the neck of the moving bottles became stuck in the machine, which additionally broke bottles whose contents drenched workers. In addition, the caps made by the machine did not seal properly so that carbonation gas escaped from the Grapico bottles. After Grapico refused to pay the US$358 balance, the Sheriff seized the bottling machine from Grapico. The matter was resolved 3½ years later by the Louisiana First Circuit Court of Appeal, who set aside the machine sales contract so that Grapico Bottling Works no longer owed the balance.

By 1922, R. R. Rochell's Grapico had been expanded into the Florida soft drink market. With Grapico Bottling Company (Mississippi) dissolved in 1925 and Pan American prohibited from using the name "Grapico" in connection with the Grapico artificial grape drink, Rochell became the sole supplier of bottled Grapico in Alabama, Florida, Georgia, Mississippi, and Louisiana in 1929.

In 1938, R. R. Rochell was doing business in Alabama as "Orange Crush 7-Up Bottling Company." At that time, it cost .44312 cents to produce a case of Grapico at Rochell's plant in Birmingham and to deliver that same case approximately 100 miles (160 km) away cost .32734 cents, making a total cost of approximately .77 cents per case to deliver a case of soft drinks to the areas surrounding Birmingham. The product was sold at .80 a case, for a .03 cent profit per case.

Grapico logo from the 1920s to the 1980s.

Just before he died in early 1940, R. R. Rochell filed for a federal trademark on Grapico on behalf of Orange Crush 7-Up Bottling Company. The federal trademark issued just after Rochell. secured the national rights to the Grapico mark to the Orange Crush 7-Up Bottling Company. In that same year, Grapico was sold using the trademarked slogan,

"The Drink of the Nation • Made its Way by the Way its Made."

In June 1947, Rochell's business began using the names "The Grapico Bottling Company" and "The Grapico Company of America." In October 1949, "The Grapico Bottling Company" name was changed to "Orange Crush 7 Up Bottling Company" to reflect the work it was doing in Alabama on behalf of the Seven-up Company. Despite the Alabama company's efforts, the Seven-up Company refused to grant The Grapico Company of America a bottling franchise to handle Seven-up soft drinks. The business was operating as Orange Crush-Grapico Bottling Company by 1953. In July 1957, the bottling business name was officially changed to "Orange Crush Grapico Company."

In 1955, Grapico Company of America expanded its fruit-flavored brands into orange with Orangico, a play on the name Grapico. Orangico was to include real orange juice. The orange juice based Orangico did not sell well and the federal trademark eventually expired in 1999.

In September 1981, both the franchising rights to the Grapico brand name and The Pepsi Bottling Group in Newnan, Georgia were acquired by Buffalo Rock, an independent Pepsi bottler founded in Birmingham, Alabama in 1901. Both Buffalo Rock and R.R. Rochell's businesses were located in Birmingham since the early 1900s. For example, in October 1940, R.R. Rochell's business was located at 1031 11th Avenue North and Buffalo Rock's business was located at 10th Avenue and 26th Street North—a distance of about three miles (5 km).

Between at least 1981 and 1988, Grapico was distributed in only three states: Alabama, Florida and Georgia. In August 1988, Buffalo Rock announced that they would expand distribution of Grapico the rest of the Southeastern United States. The announcement coincided with the new, more contemporary Grapico packaging. By June 1990, Grapico was being sold in South Carolina.

Buffalo Rock revived the Orangico trademark in 1999, this time to be used on an artificial orange syrup rather than a real orange-based drink. Buffalo Rock introduced Diet Grapico in 2005. Grapico is produced by Buffalo Rock through its Columbus, Georgia, bottling facility, Sun Fresh Beverages, Inc.

At the request of Buffalo Rock, a cupcake shop in Homewood introduced a Grapico cupcake in 2012.

== In popular culture ==
Grapico is mentioned in Fried Green Tomatoes at the Whistle Stop Cafe, 1987 best selling novel by Fannie Flagg. Anne George's 1996 novel Murder on a Bad Hair Day: A Southern Sisters Mystery, and the 2004 novel Making Waves by Cassandra King, Grapico mixed with Absolut Peppar jalapeño flavored vodka is a drink called the Ex-girlfriend. It's called the Ex-girlfriend because "it's sweet and seems like a good idea, but eventually it's going to burn you and make you sick." Grapico and coconut rum is called a "grapicolada." NFL QB Jameis Winston has said his favorite childhood drink was Grapico and he would drink it while eating pickled pig's feet.

== Gallery ==
Meet Me in the Land of Grapico

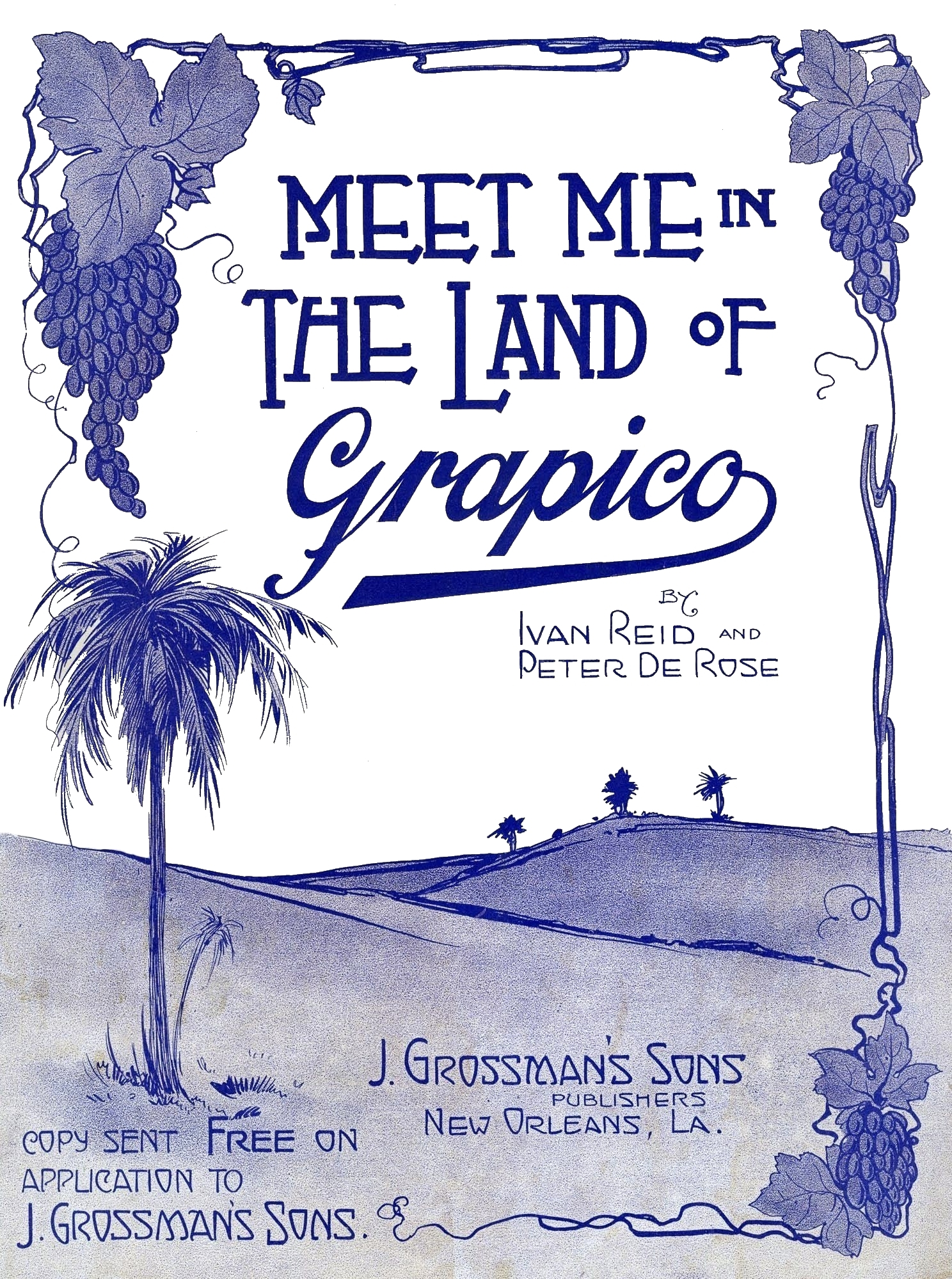

Grapico being bottled in 1917

Grapico bottled being packaged in 1917

Grapico bottles and syrup barrels being shipped in 1917

Grapico accounting office in 1917

Grapico mail order in 1917

Grapico manufacturing plant in 1917
