= James Vernor =

Union Army officer

- Born: April 11, 1843; Albany, New York, U.S.
- Died: October 29, 1927 (aged 84); Grosse Ile Township, Michigan, U.S.
- Burial place: Woodmere Cemetery
- Military career
- Allegiance: United States
- Branch: United States Army; Union Army
- Service years: 1862–1865
- Rank: Second lieutenant
- Unit: 4th Michigan Cavalry
- Conflicts: American Civil War

James Vernor Sr. (April 11, 1843 – October 29, 1927) was an American pharmacist and druggist who began selling Vernors brand ginger ale in 1880.

== Biography ==
Vernor was born in Albany, New York, moving with his parents to Detroit, Michigan in his youth. While employed at Higby and Sterns' Drug Store in Detroit, Vernor began experimenting with ginger ale. After the start of the American Civil War, he enlisted and served with the 4th Michigan Cavalry from 1862 to 1865, becoming a Second Lieutenant before being discharged.

According to a discredited company legend, when Vernor left to serve in the war he had stored his ginger ale syrup base in an oak cask. After returning four years later, he opened the keg and found the drink made from it had changed through the aging process. He declared it "Deliciously different," which became the drink's motto. However, in a 1936 interview, son James Vernor Jr. suggested that his father did not develop the Vernors Ginger Ale formula until after the war, a fact confirmed both by former company president James Vernor Davis in a 1962 interview and the 1911 trademark application on "Vernor's" as a name for ginger ale and extract. According to it Vernors did not enter commerce until 1880.

In 1896, Vernor and his son James Vernor II closed the drugstore and together opened a soda fountain on Woodward Avenue south of Jefferson Avenue near the riverfront ferry docks, and organized a manufacturing plant. By 1915, they expanded operations to include a bottling company, which widely manufactured Vernor's Ginger Ale.

Vernor was one of the original members of the Michigan Board of Pharmacy, formed in 1887, and held License No. 1 throughout his career. Vernor also served on the Detroit City Council for 25 years.

Vernor died in Grosse Ile, Michigan October 29, 1927, at age 84 from pneumonia and influenza. He is buried at Woodmere Cemetery in the southwest section of Detroit, Michigan.
