= Rocco Morabito (photographer) =

American photographer

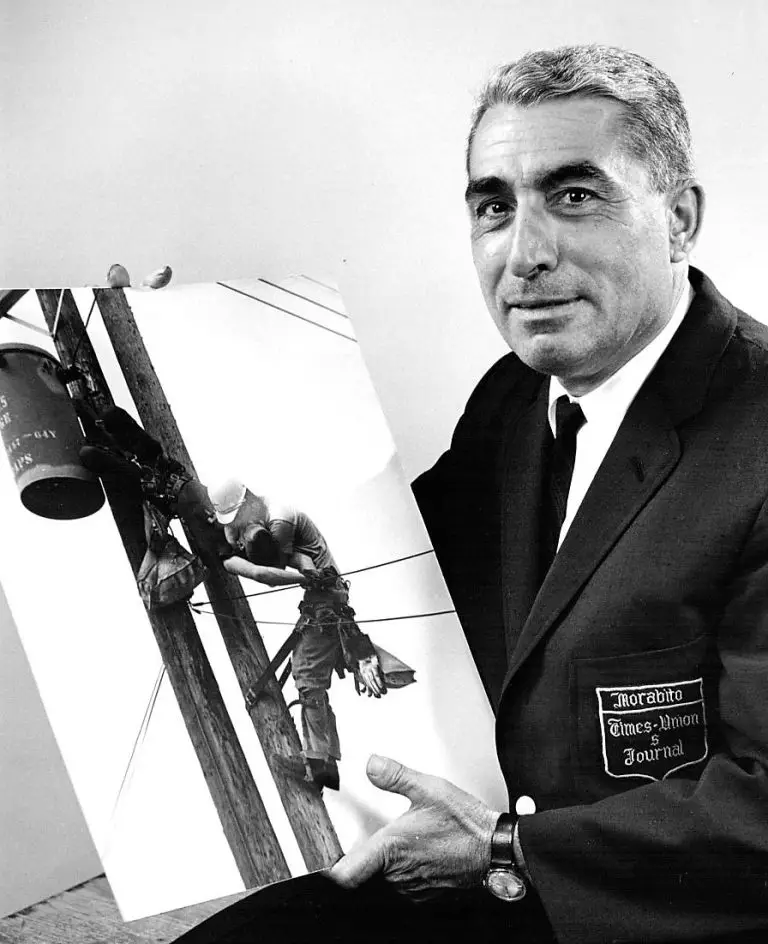
- Morabito in 1968 with "The Kiss of Life"
- Born: November 2, 1920; Port Chester, New York, U.S.
- Died: April 5, 2009 (aged 88)
- Known for: Photography
- Awards: Pulitzer Prize for Spot News Photography

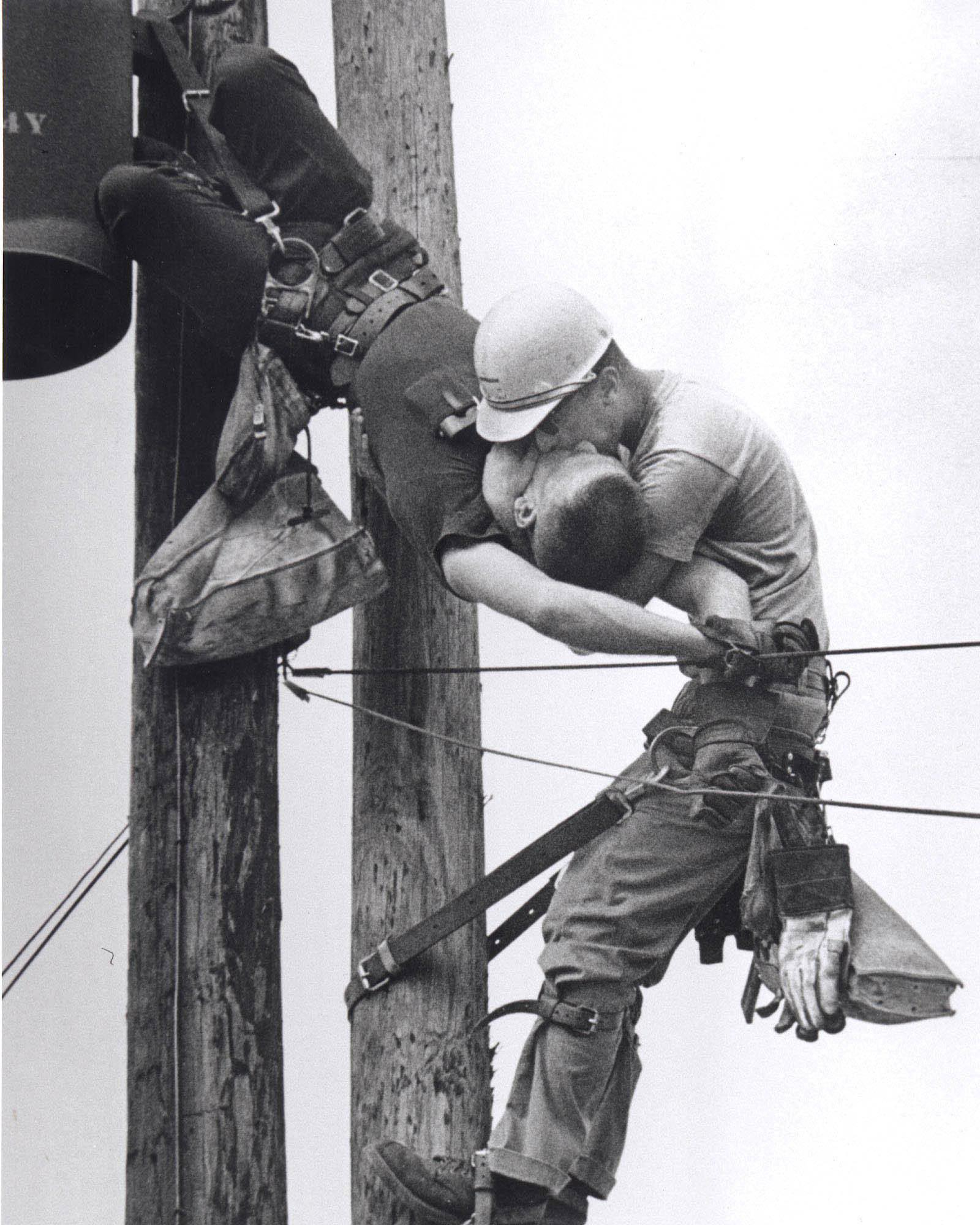
Morabito's Pulitzer Prize-winning photograph, "The Kiss of Life"

Rocco Morabito (November 2, 1920 – April 5, 2009) was an American photographer who spent the majority of his career at the Jacksonville Journal.

Morabito, born in Port Chester, New York, moved to Florida when he was 5, and by age 10 was working as a newsboy, selling papers for the Jacksonville Journal. He served in World War II in the Army Air Forces as a ball-turret gunner on a B-17. After the war, he returned to the Jacksonville Journal and started his photography career shooting sporting events for the paper. He worked for the Journal for 42 years, 33 of them as a photographer, until retiring in 1982.

The news photographer won the 1968 Pulitzer Prize for Spot News Photography for "The Kiss of Life", a Jacksonville Journal photo that showed mouth-to-mouth resuscitation between two workers on a utility pole. Randall G. Champion was unconscious and hanging upside down after contacting a low voltage line; fellow lineman J.D. Thompson revived him while strapped to the pole by the waist. Thanks to Thompson's intervention, Champion survived and lived until 2002, when he died of heart failure at the age of 64. Thompson was still living as of July 2026.

Morabito died on April 5, 2009, while in hospice care.
