= Blenheim Ginger Ale =

Ginger ale brand

Blenheim Ginger ale
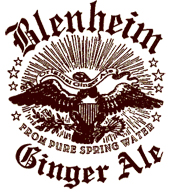
- Type: Soft drink
- Manufacturer: Blenheim Bottling Company
- Origin: United States
- Introduced: 1903
- Color: Golden
- Flavor: Ginger
- Variants: Old #3 Hot, #5 Not as Hot, #9 Diet
- Website: http://www.blenheimgingerale.com/

Blenheim Ginger Ale is a ginger ale bottled by Blenheim Bottlers in Hamer, Dillon County, South Carolina, but was originally bottled in Blenheim, Marlboro County, South Carolina. It has deep roots in the Pee Dee region of South Carolina, as it was created by a local doctor in the 1890s by mixing Jamaica ginger and sugar with local mineral waters and dispensed as a tonic for dyspepsia.

== History ==
As the story goes, in 1781, Patriot James Spears was attempting to run from the British during the Revolutionary War, when his shoe became stuck in the mud of the natural spring; he left it and kept running. Upon his return, he recovered his shoe and noticed the amount of water in the depression his shoe left. He tasted the water and noticed its strong mineral content. Word of the natural spring spread quickly and before long, the area became popular among the wealthy plantation owners and by the late 1800s a small town was established.

In the late 1890s, Dr. C. R. May began prescribing the mineral springs' water to his patients complaining of stomach troubles. Because his patients frequently complained about the strong iron-like taste of the water, the doctor decided to make the water more palatable by adding Jamaican ginger and sugar. The new concoction's popularity took off and Dr. May partnered with A. J. Matheson to open the Blenheim Bottling Company in 1903. Conveniently located next to the mineral springs, the Blenheim Bottling Company plant was constructed in 1920. Producing as little as 18 to 20 cases a day, the company remained a small, humble operation for 90 years.

In 1993, Blenheim was bought by Alan Schafer, who also owned the world-famous South of the Border roadside attraction. Since the original plant was older, Schafer decided that rather than refurbish the building, he would move the bottling operations to a new plant located next to South of the Border.

== Today ==
Despite a marketing push that began in the late 1990s, Blenheim ginger ale is not widely distributed outside the Carolinas; however in more recent years, the company ships to 44 states and three international distributors. The spicy ale has, however, developed a cult following among food and wine aficionados. In February 1998, New York Times journalist Bill Grimes described the taste this way: "The first swallow brings on a four-sneeze fit. The second one clears out the sinuses and leaves the tongue and throat throbbing with prickly heat."

Luckily for its loyal followers, Blenheim's recipe has not changed in over 110 years and has three varieties to choose from: #3 Hot (pink cap), #5 Not As Hot (gold cap) and #9 Diet (white cap).

== In the News ==
- Charles Kuralt did a segment on Blenheim Ginger Ale for CBS (On the Road with Charles Kuralt - June 26, 1983)
- Penn Jillette is a fan of Blenheim Ginger Ale and wore a Blenheim shirt on the cover of Wired Magazine.
- Behind Blenheim's. Turner South. Wednesday, April 13, 2005 at 8:54 AM/ET. Retrieved May 16, 2005.
