= Andrew Bee (soldier) =

- Military career
- Allegiance: United States of America; Union
- Branch: Union Army
- Rank: Private
- Units: 4th Michigan Cavalry, Company L.
- Conflicts: American Civil War

Andrew Bee of Martin, Michigan was an American soldier, a private in the 4th Michigan Cavalry, Company L.

On May 7, 1865, the 4th Michigan Cavalry, under the command of Lieutenant Colonel Benjamin D. Pritchard, invaded the encampment of Confederate president Jefferson Davis. Private Bee discovered that Davis was in fact present and disguised in women's clothing. Davis's shawl and petticoat became the property of the War Department, which turned them over to the National Archives, where they still reside. He alerted Corporal Munger, who made the capture, ending Davis' hopes of re-establishing the Confederate government in the Trans-Mississippi.

This event concluded one of the two "great man-hunts" following the war... this being the hunt for Davis, the other being the hunt for Lincoln's killer. It should here be noted that there was a $100,000 reward out for Davis's capture, and that this reward was used to build what is now Allegan, Michigan's 'historic district" in the "water-tower hill" neighborhood. It was not until the two great man-hunts were concluded that Reconstruction really got under way.
