= Red Rock (drink) =

Brand of ginger ale and cola

- Type: Carbonated soft drink
- Distributor: Clayton Distributing Company
- Origin: Atlanta, Georgia
- Introduced: 1885; 141 years ago
- Color: Golden; Dark brown
- Variants: Golden Ginger Ale, Diet Golden Ginger Ale, Premium Root Beer, Premium Cola, Premium Grape, Premium Peach and Premium Orange
- Related products: Red Rock Company
- Website: https://www.drinkredrock.com

Red Rock is a brand of golden ginger ale, diet golden ginger ale, premium cola, premium root beer, premium grape, premium orange and premium peach. The Red Rock Company was among the oldest producers of carbonated beverages in the United States.

== History ==
=== 19th century ===
The Red Rock Company was founded in 1885 by Lee Hagan and G. T. Dodd of Atlanta, Georgia. Dodd initially introduced ginger ale as the company's first product, which became popular in the Southern U.S.

=== 20th century ===
In 1938, Red Rock was an early leader in the distribution of carbonated beverages, distributing 12-ounce bottles by way of a distribution network of 200 bottlers. In 1939, building on this newfound success, Red Rock secured an endorsement from baseball's greatest, Babe Ruth. In 1947, Red Rock products were bottled in 45 of the 48 U.S. states. In 1958, the company's success began to decline due to the overwhelming increases in sugar prices.

Red Rock Cola was endorsed by famous baseball player Babe Ruth. Posters of his endorsement were printed in 1939.

After the 1950s, the Red Rock Company seemed to vanish entirely. It is unknown when the company disestablished. An orphaned affiliate continued producing the product in the Dominican Republic.

=== 21st century ===
The rights to the formulas for Red Rock's carbonated beverage products are owned by Clayton Distributing Company of Atlanta, Georgia. Red Rock can be found in retail locations in the southeastern United States, including grocery chains Publix, Kroger (Atlanta/Nashville divisions), Walmart (North Georgia divisions), Ingles, Winn Dixie, Food Depot, and Food Lion. The beverages are produced by Sensient Technologies and bottled by Tri-City Beverage.
