= Ginger ale =

Soft drink flavoured with ginger

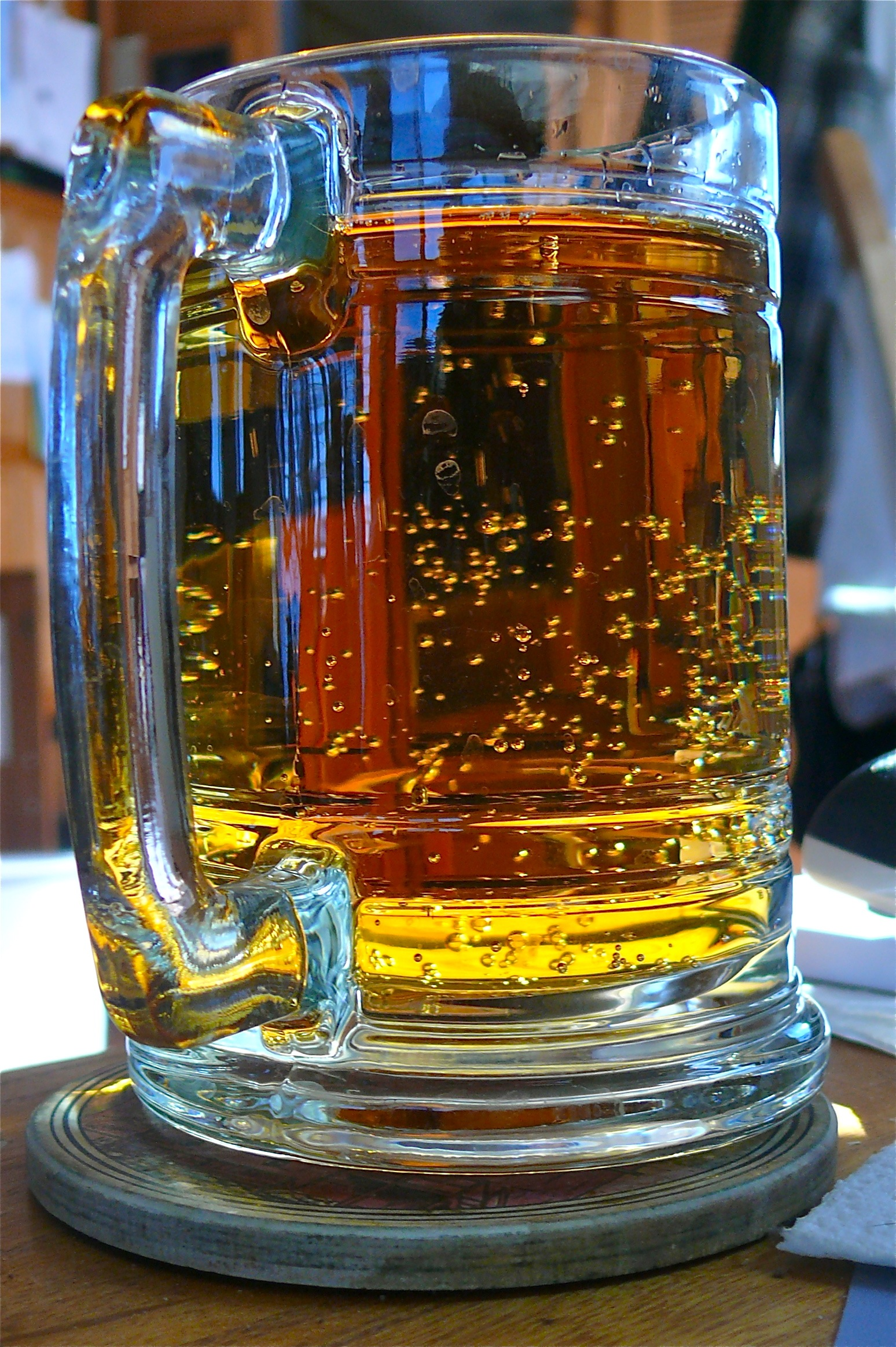
- Vernors golden ginger ale
- Type: Soft drink
- Origin: Ireland and Canada
- Introduced: 1851 (golden); 1904 (dry) and Southern Ontario, Canada
- Colour: Golden
- Flavour: Ginger
- Variants: Golden and dry

Ginger ale is a carbonated soft drink (not an ale) flavoured with ginger. It is consumed on its own or used as a mixer, often with spirit-based drinks. There are two main types of ginger ale. The golden style is credited to the Irish doctor Thomas Joseph Cantrell. The dry style (also called the pale style), a paler drink with a much milder ginger flavour, was created by Canadian John McLaughlin.

== History ==
Ginger ale is transparent, whereas ginger beer, a stronger tasting product, is often cloudy due to the residues of brewing. Thomas Joseph Cantrell, an Irish apothecary and surgeon, manufactured the first ginger ale in Belfast, Ireland, in the 1850s. He set out to create a soft drink. This was the older "golden style" fermented ginger ale, dark coloured, generally sweet to taste, with a strong ginger spice flavour, which he marketed through local beverage manufacturer Grattan and Company. Grattan embossed the slogan "The Original Makers of Ginger Ale" on its bottles.

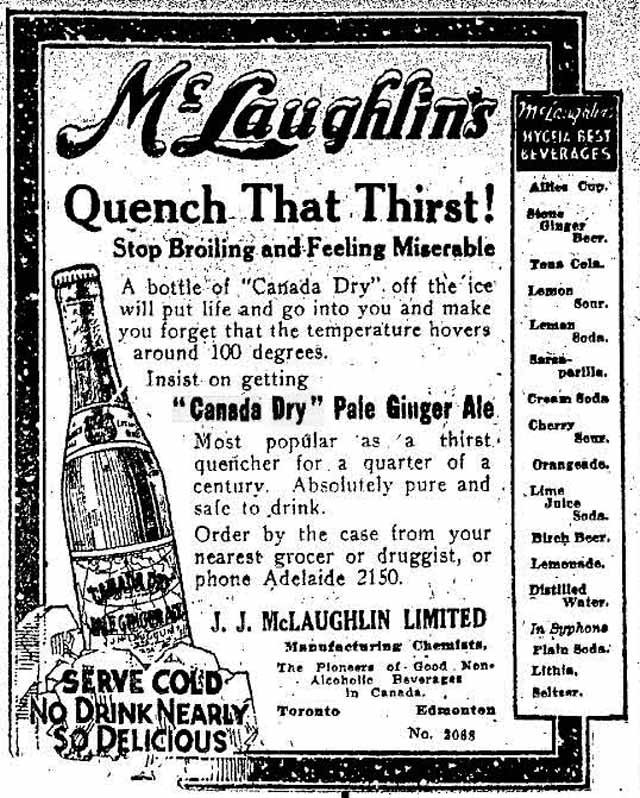
1916 Toronto Star ad for Canada Dry ginger ale

Dry ginger ale was created by Canadian John J. McLaughlin, a chemist and pharmacist. Having established a soda water bottling plant in 1890, McLaughlin began developing flavour extracts to add to the water in 1904. That year, he introduced "Pale Dry" Ginger Ale, the bubbly drink that would be patented in 1907 as Canada Dry Ginger Ale. A success, Canada Dry products were accepted by appointment to the Vice-Regal Household of the Governor General of Canada. The dry-style also became popular in the United States during the Prohibition era, when it was used as a mixer for alcoholic beverages.

=== Ingredients ===
Traditional ginger ale is fermented from a microbial starter culture (yeast or ginger bug), sugar, fresh ginger root, other flavourings and water. Ginger bug can be derived from ginger beer plant containing Saccharomyces florentinus and Lactobacillus hilgardii or fresh ginger root containing Lactobacillus bacteria and wild yeast. The carbonation comes from the yeast fermentation as opposed to carbonating the finished product. Ethanol, as a byproduct of fermentation, will be present in the ginger ale but can be controlled by modifying fermentation time.

Commercial ginger ale commonly contains carbonated water, sugar or high-fructose corn syrup, and artificial or natural ginger-flavour. Ginger content is often listed on labels in a general "natural aroma" or "natural flavouring" statement, to preserve secrecy of the complex proprietary mix of spices, fruits and other flavours used; lemon, lime, and cane sugar are the most common ingredients. Pineapple and honey are also occasionally used.

== Processing ==
=== Fermentation ===
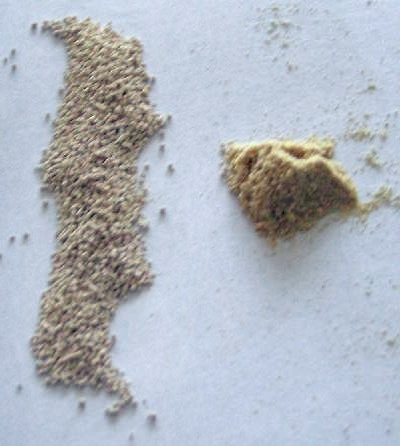
Yeast

Traditional ginger ale is fermented using ginger, yeast, water, sugar, and possibly other flavourings. A ginger bug – a slurry of ginger and sugar used to propagate the yeast and bacteria found on the ginger skin – may be used in place of commercial yeast.

=== Artificial carbonation ===
Rather than ferment their product, most commercial ginger ale bottlers will carbonate their soda by chilling the water to a low temperature to allow more carbon dioxide to be dissolved. Then, alkaline compounds such as sodium bicarbonate may be added to reduce acidity. Lastly, carbon dioxide is added and slightly over-pressurized to facilitate movement into storage and the filling machine.

== Uses ==
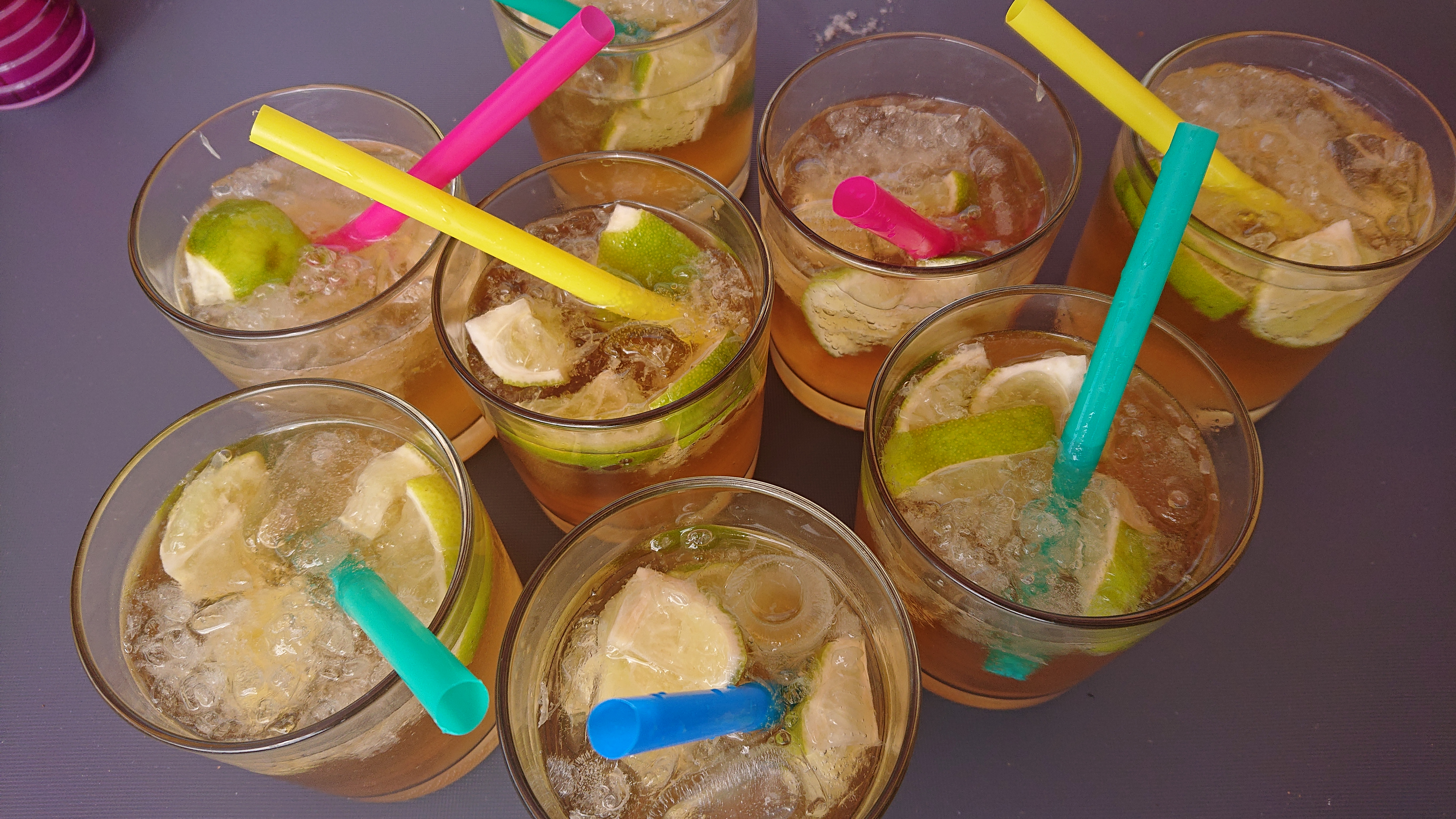
Glasses of ginger ale with wedges of limes

Ginger ale is consumed as a soft drink and a mixer in cocktails and punch. It is sometimes used by non-drinkers or in the performing arts as a non-alcoholic substitute for Champagne/sparkling wine or beer, since the beverages resemble each other in appearance. Ginger ale is also added to beer to make shandy.

Ginger ale has traditionally been used as a home remedy, particularly for indigestion and nausea.

== Nutrition ==
Ginger ale is usually acceptable for people on a clear liquid diet. It is generally high in sugar, with commercial varieties containing around 10 g of sugar per 100 ml.

== Variations ==
=== Ginger ale vs ginger beer ===
Ginger ale and ginger beer are similar beverages, however, there are clear differences during the process. Ginger beer originated in England in the 1800s while ginger ale was founded in Ireland approximately 50 years later before it was modernized in 1907 by John McLaughlin. Original ginger beer contains 11% alcohol, but modern ginger beer contains less than 0.5% alcohol while modern ginger ale has absolutely no alcohol content. Ginger beer is brewed with natural ginger, lemon juice, sugar and it is fermented with a ginger beer plant culture (mainly Lactobacillus). The fermentation of the Lactobacillus produces a cloudy appearance, stronger-tasting and spicier flavour compared to ginger ale. Other differences between ginger ale and ginger beer are in terms of taste and aroma. Whilst ginger ale is mellow and smells sweet, ginger beer has a spicy whiff and gingery taste.

=== Other flavours ===
Dry ginger ale is also sold with a mint flavouring added. Some mint ginger ale brands have an artificial green colour added, while others are clear. Canada Dry has introduced a line of ginger ale mixed with green tea and one mixed with lemonade.

== Manufacturers ==
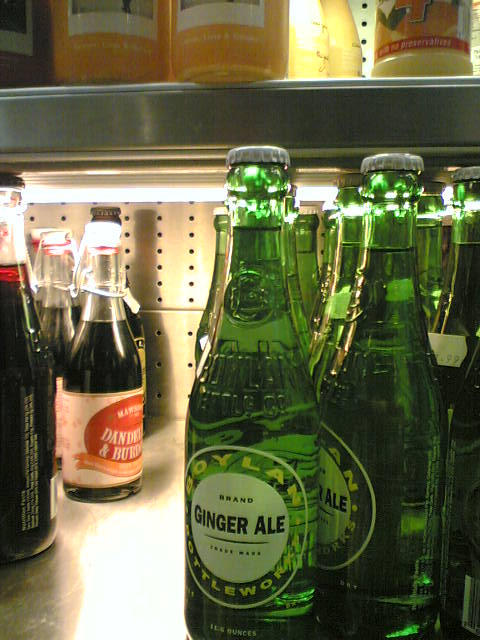
Boylan ginger ale

Vernors, Blenheim, A-Treat, Bull's Head, Chelmsford, Buffalo Rock, Sussex and Red Rock are brands of golden ginger ale. Canada Dry, and Seagram's, both formerly Canadian companies, and Schweppes, are major brands of dry ginger ale.

=== North America ===
American brands include Canfield's, Hansen Natural, Shasta, Vernors, Buffalo Rock, Boylan Bottling Company, Polar Beverages, Ale-8-One, Blenheim, Foxon Park, Fitz's, Sprecher, Market Basket/Chelmsford, Red Rock, Reed's Ginger Brew, Chek (River of Dreams) and in Canada, Sussex Golden Ginger Ale.

Vernors is a flavoured golden ginger ale aged for three years in oak barrels before bottling. It was the first U.S. soft drink, originating in 1866, although it was modelled on imported Irish ginger beers. In Detroit, Michigan, a drink made with vanilla ice cream and Vernors ginger ale is called a Boston cooler.

=== South America ===
- Cunnington

=== Asia ===
- Evervess
- East Imperial
- Kohodo
- Schweppes

== See also ==
- Ginger tea
- Ginger wine
- List of brand name soft drinks products
- List of soft drink flavors
- List of soft drink producers
- List of soft drinks by country
- Switchel
