= Buffalo Rock =

American bottler

Buffalo Rock Company
- Company type: Private
- Industry: Beverages
- Founded: 1901
- Headquarters: Birmingham, Alabama, US
- Key people: Matthew Dent, President and Chief Executive Officer; James C. Lee III, Chairman of the Board; Kevin Conaway, Executive Vice President and Chief Financial Officer; Wayne Wisdom, Senior Vice President Chief Business Operations Officer; Emily Brown Cotney, Senior Vice President Chief Employee Experience and Legal Counsel; Mike McDonald, Senior Vice President Manufacturing and Production; David Miller, Senior Vice President Customer Strategy, Marketing and Brand Development; Robin McKean, Senior Vice President Integrated Services
- Products: PepsiCo Products
- Revenue: $910 million (2023)
- Number of employees: 2,300
- Website: https://www.buffalorock.com/

Buffalo Rock Company is an independent Pepsi bottler based in Birmingham, Alabama.

== History ==
The Alabama Grocery Company was founded in Birmingham, Alabama in 1901. Five years later, the company would launch its flagship beverage, Buffalo Rock Ginger Ale, formulated by local chemist Asby Coleman.

Alabama Grocery would change its name to Buffalo Rock Company in 1927 to reflect its most popular product. Buffalo Rock would obtain a bottling franchise agreement from Pepsi-Cola in 1951, and in 1962 was granted the first Dr Pepper franchise. The company also acquired the same for Mountain Dew in 1963, only for it to be acquired by The Pepsi-Cola Company the next year. In 1967, Buffalo Rock acquired the bottling rights to 7-Up, making it the first plant in the country to bottle the products of three major beverage companies.

Buffalo Rock would acquire Pepsi-Cola of Newnan, Georgia in June 1981; with it came the rights to the Grapico brand of grape soda. Later the same year, the company entered Florida through a minority interest in Pepsi of Pensacola, which it would acquire outright in November 1984. The company expanded east to Panama City, Florida in November 1986 by way of Byrd & Son Beverages.

== Products ==
=== Buffalo Rock Ginger Ale ===
Buffalo Rock Ginger Ale is considerably darker in color and has a stronger ginger content than is customary. Buffalo Rock is sold throughout Alabama, parts of Georgia, and the panhandle of Florida.

=== Dr. Wham ===
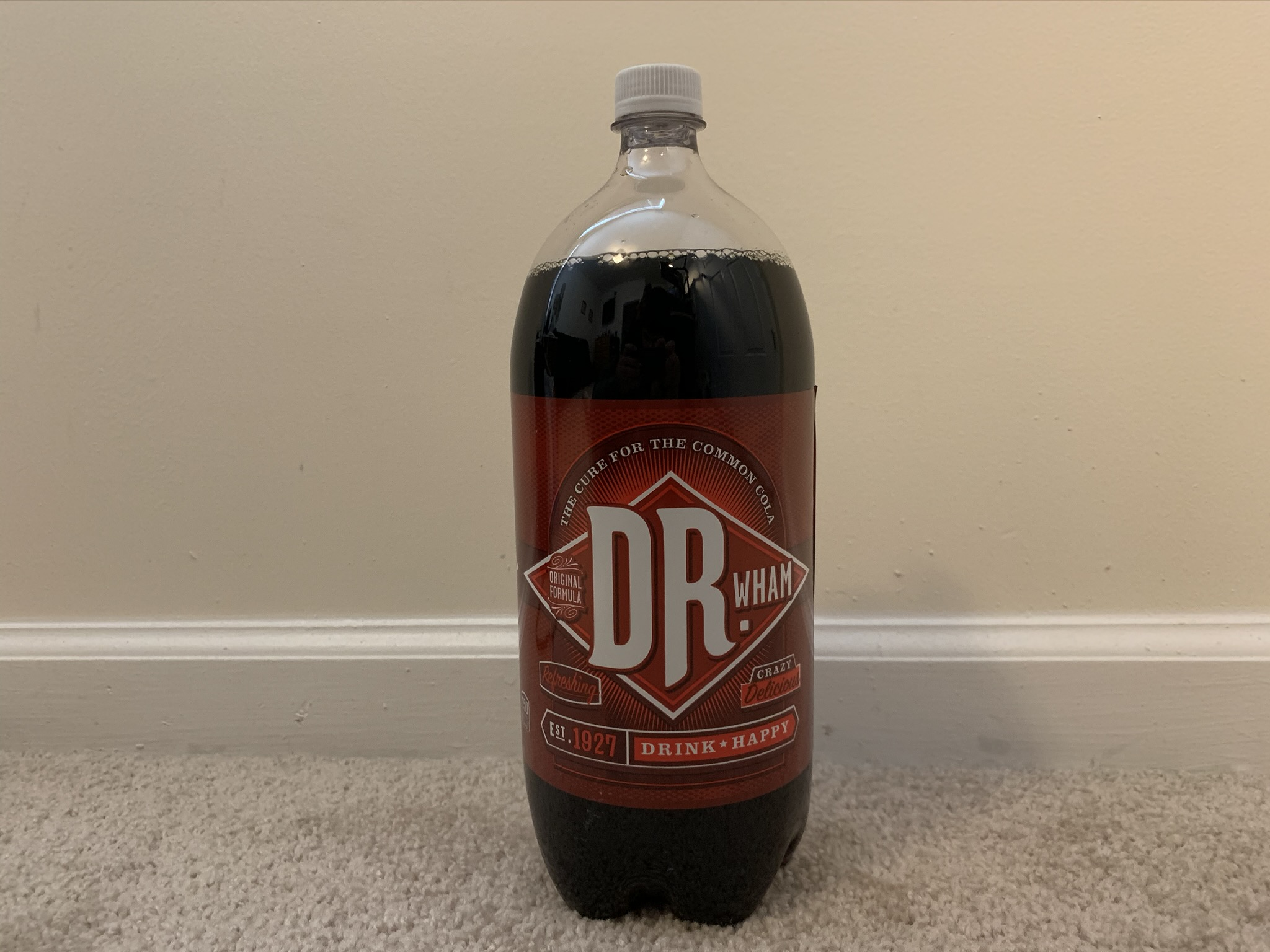
A 2-liter bottle of Dr. Wham sold in Staunton, Virginia.

In 2005, Buffalo Rock introduced a soft drink called Dr. Wham. It is both sold directly and franchised by Buffalo Rock in markets where the company does not have the territorial rights to sell Dr Pepper, including Huntsville and Montgomery in Alabama, Columbus, Georgia, Pensacola, Florida, and Staunton, Virginia. A complete list of markets that carry Dr. Wham is on the Buffalo Rock website.

== See also ==
- List of bottling companies
