= Vernors =

American ginger ale / soda brand

- Type: Ginger ale
- Manufacturer: Keurig Dr Pepper
- Origin: United States
- Introduced: 1866; 160 years ago
- Color: Golden
- Variants: Diet Vernors, Black Cherry
- Website: www.drpeppersnapplegroup.com/brands/vernors

Classic Vernor's logo with "Woody", the gnome mascot

Vernors is an American brand of vanilla ginger ale owned by Keurig Dr Pepper that was first served in 1866 by James Vernor, a pharmacist from Detroit.

== History ==
Vernors is the oldest surviving ginger ale in the United States. According to the company, it was first served to the American public in 1866.

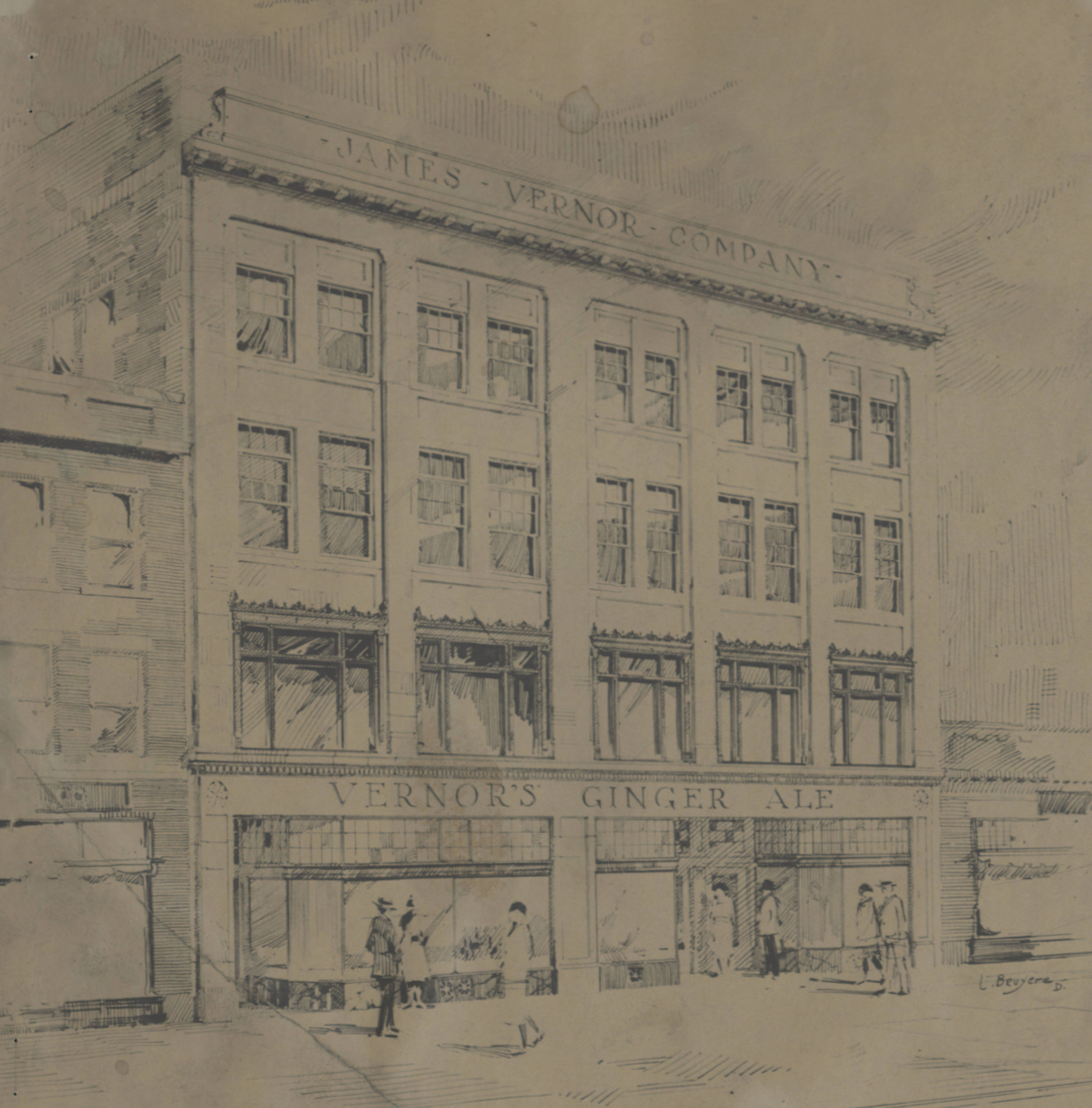
Vernors Company building in Toledo, Ohio, 1925

Vernor opened a drugstore of his own in Detroit, Michigan, on Woodward Avenue, on the southwest corner of Clifford Street and sold his ginger soda at its soda fountain. Initially, Vernors was only sold via soda fountain franchises. In 1896, Vernor closed his drugstore and opened a soda fountain closer to the city center to concentrate on the ginger ale business alone, on Woodward Avenue south of Jefferson Avenue, near the ferry docks on the Detroit River. The early Vernors soda fountains featured ornate plaster, lighting and ironwork featuring a "V" design, examples of which still exist, such as at the Halo Burger restaurant in Flint, Michigan. Later, Vernor also sold bottling franchises in other cities, requiring operators to adhere strictly to his recipe.

Vernor died October 29, 1927, and was succeeded by his son, James Vernor Jr. Expansion continued throughout Prohibition. Just prior to the onset of World War II, Vernors built a 230,000 sq ft (21,000 m^{2}) bottling plant and headquarters encompassing an entire city block on Woodward Avenue, one block from the Detroit River. In the late 1950s, when the City of Detroit proposed construction of Cobo Hall and other riverfront projects, a land-swap was negotiated, and Vernors moved its bottling plant and headquarters to the location of the old civic exhibition hall at 4501 Woodward Avenue, incorporating many of the popular features of the old plant. Tours of the Vernors plant old and new were major tourist attractions.

The brand was originally sold as Vernor's; the apostrophe was dropped in 1959. In 1962, Vernors introduced Vernors 1-Calorie, now called Vernors Zero Sugar.

In 1966, the Vernor family sold out to the first of what became a succession of owners. The company was next acquired by American Consumer Products and then by United Brands. The flagship Detroit bottling plant was shut down in 1985, with the local rights to bottle Vernors granted to Pepsi-Cola. The Woodward Avenue plant was later demolished. The Vernors brand was purchased by A&W Beverages in 1987, which was in turn purchased by Cadbury Schweppes. Today, Vernors is property of Keurig Dr Pepper of Burlington, Massachusetts, and Plano, Texas, and the flagship bottling plant serving Michigan is the Keurig Dr Pepper bottling plant in Holland, Michigan.

In August 2022, Vernors released a black cherry flavor, its first new flavor in more than 50 years. The limited-time product was only available in Michigan and the Toledo, Ohio, area.

== Characteristics ==
Vernors is a sweet "golden" ginger ale that derives its color, like other commercial, industrially produced ginger ales, from caramel, and has a robust, vanilla-heavy flavor. The Vernors style was common before Prohibition, during which "dry" pale, less sweet ginger ale (typified by Canada Dry Ginger Ale) became popular as a drink mixer.

Vernors is highly carbonated.

Los Angeles Metropolitan News-Enterprise Editor Roger Grace describes the original flavor as "mellow yet perky" with the mellowness attributed to the aging in oak barrels, and the perkiness to the use of more ginger than "dry" ginger ales.

=== Formula ===
A company-spread legend once held that prior to the start of the American Civil War James Vernor, then a clerk at the Higby & Sterns drugstore in Detroit, experimented with flavors in an attempt to duplicate a popular ginger ale imported from Dublin, Ireland. When Vernor was called off to serve he stored the syrup base of 19 ingredients, including ginger, vanilla and other natural flavorings, in an oaken cask. When he was discharged four years later he found the concentrate had been changed by being aged in the wood. The drink made from it was like nothing else he had ever tasted, and he purportedly declared it "Deliciously different," which remains the drink's motto to this day.

In a 1936 interview, however, James Vernor Jr., admitted that the formula was not developed by his father until after the war was over. This was confirmed both in a 1962 interview with former company president, James Vernor Davis, and a 1911 trademark application on "Vernor's" as a name for ginger ale and extract indicating Vernor's ginger ale first entered commerce in 1880.

== Distribution ==
For most of its history, Vernors was a regional product. Initially Vernor sold franchises throughout Michigan and in major regional cities; the product was also available in Ontario, Canada. In the 1970s and 1980s Vernors-flavored ice cream was sold by Sanders Confectionery.

Vernors was not mass distributed nationally for many years; by 1997, the brand's distribution had expanded to a 33-state area. In 1997, even after expansion, Michigan accounted for 80% of Vernors sales. Ohio and Illinois were the next-highest-selling states; the drink was also very popular in Florida, which has large numbers of retired or relocated former Michigan residents. In 2015, Dr Pepper Snapple said that it sold more than 7 million cases of Vernors, about 1% of the company's total sales volume. At that time, a "large percentage — although not a majority — of the sales" were in Michigan.

== Promotions ==
A number of slogans have been associated with Vernors over the years. Advertising in the early 1900s used the slogan "Detroit's Drink". According to its trademark application, it began using the slogan "Deliciously Different" in 1921. The labels formerly read "Aged 4 years in wood", which was changed some years ago to "Flavor aged in oak barrels", again in 1996 to "Barrel Aged, Bold Taste" and currently notes "Barrel Aged 3 Years • Bold Taste". The apostrophe in the name "Vernor's" was dropped in the late 1950s. For a time in the mid-1980s, Vernors used the slogan "It's what we drink around here" in its advertising campaigns. The gnome mascot, named "Woody", was used from the start of the 20th century until 1987, when it was dropped by A&W Brands in favor of new packaging, but had returned to the packaging by the 2000s. As recently as October 2013, Vernors features a picture of Woody with the slogan "A Michigan Original Since 1866", plus a picture of a barrel with the slogan "Barrel Aged – Bold Taste". As of January 2016, the wording surrounding the picture was changed to "Authentic • Bold Taste".

The identity of the Vernors gnome mascot has been contested and as a result, there is significant local folklore surrounding the gnome. While the Dr. Pepper company insists the name of the gnome has always been Woody, Lawrence L. Rouch, Vernors historian, argues this was not the case. He agrees that the gnome mascot surfaced sometime in the early 1900s and lasted through to the 1980s, but found no historical evidence of the name "Woody" being associated with the gnome.

There is general consensus, however, of Ronald Bialecki's live-action appearances as the gnome in the 1970s. According to both Vernors historians and Bialecki's family members, he was employed with the Doner Company at the time, which was the advertising firm in charge of the Vernors account. His arrival at work one morning was followed by widespread agreement amongst both Vernors representatives and Doner ad executives that he should be cast as the gnome. Bialecki was so dedicated to the role that he and his wife created a gnome costume for public appearances. During his time as the Vernors mascot, Bialecki made personal appearances in the "gnome mobile" which he also designed for the enjoyment of the local public.

=== 150th anniversary ===
The Detroit Historical Society and Museum teamed up with the Vernor's Collectors' Club and the Detroit Experience Factory to celebrate the brand. Starting June 7, 2016, a Vernors memorabilia exhibition showed artifacts and vintage signage from the brand. The feature ran through June 12, 2016, at the Detroit Historical Museum.

== Use ==
Some people drink Vernors hot as a remedy for stomach ache. Others, such as some Detroit natives, add it to impart a sweet and spicy flavor to dishes. Soul singer Aretha Franklin became famous in the city for demonstrating a recipe, traditionally at her church, for Christmas ham with a glaze made with the soft drink; Vernors has also been used in a glaze for salmon and in a batter for onion rings.

=== Boston cooler ===
A Boston cooler, also known as a Vernors float, is an ice cream soda variant typically composed of Vernors Ginger Ale and vanilla ice cream blended together similar to a milkshake; however, in other parts of the United States, different combinations of ingredients are also known as a Boston cooler. Some native Detroiters simply put a scoop or two of vanilla ice cream in a glass, add Vernors and a soda straw, and call it a Boston cooler. While some claim it is named Boston cooler for being invented on Boston Boulevard in Detroit, but Boston Boulevard had not been developed when the drink was named.

While the Boston cooler name origins date to the 1880s, the adoption and or conflation with the Boston - Edison Historic District in Detroit is understandable. The neighborhood's rise to prominence with the completion of the Henry Ford House in 1908 was well underway by the time the Boston cooler first began gaining national publicity in the 1910s. The Sanders family who popularized the drink locally in their Woodward Avenue confectionery in the 1800s built the Fredrick Sanders House on Boston Boulevard in 1922 potentially cementing the perceived connection in minds of residents long accustom to the drink.

== See also ==
- Moxie
- List of regional beverages of the United States
